= Daniel Peterson (physician) =

American physician

Daniel Peterson is an American physician in private practice in the state of Nevada, and has been described as a "pioneer" in the treatment of Myalgic encephalomyelitis/chronic fatigue syndrome (ME/CFS). He graduated from the University of Rochester School of Medicine, Rochester, New York, in 1976 and was an intern and resident at the University of Utah Medical Center from 1976 to 1979. In 1979, he became a diplomate of the American Board of Internal Medicine. He is president of Sierra Internal Medicine of Incline Village, established in 1981.

== Work in Myalgic encephalomyelitis/chronic fatigue syndrome ==
Along with Paul Cheney, Peterson was a treating physician at Incline Village during an outbreak of ME/CFS that began in 1984 in the Lake Tahoe region. From 1984 to 1987, the illness was recorded in 259 patients in the area by the two physicians. The Lake Tahoe outbreak became the subject of several studies by Peterson and others. In 1995, Peterson and other investigators started conducting a 10-year follow-up study on patients seen during the outbreak. The study results were published in 2001 by the Journal of Chronic Fatigue Syndrome. In the 2000 CFS documentary I Remember Me, Peterson was interviewed about some of his experiences during the Lake Tahoe outbreak.

In 1988, Peterson was the first physician to treat an extremely ill person diagnosed with ME/CFS with the experimental drug Ampligen by obtaining compassionate-use permission from the U.S. Food and Drug Administration. Quantitative improvement in the first patient enabled the next pilot study of Ampligen in ME/CFS patients by Peterson and other researchers. During the 1990 CFIDS Conference in Charlotte, North Carolina, Peterson described positive results in 15 CFS patents after he treated them with Ampligen for approximately 6 months. In 1990 and 1991, Peterson was one of four principal investigators for the FDA approved phase II randomized placebo controlled double-blind study of the experimental intravenous drug Ampligen. The drug was administered in his Incline Village facility and three other sites. Peterson and others reported that there was statistically significant improvement in the patients receiving Ampligen. He is a principal investigator of the FDA-approved open-label safety and efficacy phase III drug study of Ampligen for treatment of ME/CFS. Hemispherx Biopharma's New Drug Application for marketing and sale of Ampligen to treat ME/CFS was rejected in December 2009 because the FDA concluded that the two RCTs "did not provide credible evidence of efficacy."

Peterson was a member of the International Chronic Fatigue Syndrome Study Group that coauthored the most widely used clinical and research description of CFS, called the 1994 CDC definition, and the Fukuda definition. He is a coauthor of Myalgic Encephalomyelitis/Chronic Fatigue Syndrome: Clinical Working Case Definition, Diagnostic and Treatment Protocols, initiated by Health Canada and published by an international group of researchers in 2003.

Peterson, along with Annette and Harvey Whittemore, helped establish the Whittemore Peterson Institute (WPI) for Neuro-Immune Disease at the University of Nevada in 2005 to aid patients with chronic fatigue syndrome, fibromyalgia and related illnesses. In October 2009 Peterson was interviewed on National Public Radio about his views on ME/CFS and the newly published possible association with the retrovirus XMRV.

In 2010, Peterson left WPI for personal reasons. He stated there was a lack of collaboration with him over the research direction of the institute concerning XMRV. Peterson then teamed with Jay Levy, one of the original discoverers of HIV, to try to determine whether XMRV is truly present in patients by testing the same patients used in the study published in Science. They did not find indications of XMRV in the blood of the patients tested, and also concluded from their experiments that XMRV does not, "survive well in human blood", so human infection is unlikely. They also stated that research results published by others suggested that laboratory contamination may have resulted in false positive results in the original study.

== Affiliations and awards ==
Peterson is a member of the board of directors and the scientific advisory board of the HHV-6 Foundation, a non-profit organization promoting human herpesvirus 6 (HHV-6) associated scientific and clinical research. Peterson was part of the founding board and is a past-president of the International Association for CFS/ME, a professional organization advocating for the interests of ME/CFS researchers and clinicians worldwide.

In 2003, he received the Rudy Perpich award, an award given to distinguished CFS/FM scientists, physicians or healthcare workers, and in 2007, received the Nelson Gantz Outstanding Clinician Award from the International Association for CFS/ME.

In 1999, Peterson was commended by the Assembly and Senate of the State of Nevada for his work and dedication to persons with ME/CFS.

== Selected publications ==
- Lombardi, Vincent C.; Ruscetti, Francis W.; Das Gupta, Jaydip; Pfost, Max A.; Hagen, Kathryn S.; Peterson, Daniel L.; Ruscetti, Sandra K.; Bagni, Rachel K.; Petrow-Sadowski, Cari; Gold, Bert; Dean, Michael; Silverman, Robert H.; Mikovits, Judy A. (October 2009). "Detection of an Infectious Retrovirus, XMRV, in Blood Cells of Patients with Chronic Fatigue Syndrome". Science. 326 (5952): 585–589. Bibcode:2009Sci...326..585L. doi:10.1126/science.1179052. PMC 3073172. PMID 19815723. (Retracted, see doi:10.1126/science.334.6063.1636-a, PMID 22194552, Retraction Watch)
- Shetzline, Susan E.; Martinand-Mari, Camille; Reichenbach, Nancy L.; Buletic, Zivjena; Lebleu, Bernard; Pfleiderer, Wolfgang; Charubala, Ramamurthy; De Meirleir, Kenny; De Becker, Pascale; Peterson, Daniel L.; Herst, C.V.T.; Englebienne, Patrick; Suhadolnik, Robert J. (April 2002). "Structural and functional features of the 37-kDa 2-5A-dependent RNase L in chronic fatigue syndrome". J. Interferon Cytokine Res. 22 (4): 443–456. doi:10.1089/10799900252952235. PMID 12034027.
- Ablashi, D.V.; Eastman, H.B.; Owen, C.B.; Roman, M.M.; Friedman, J.; Zabriskie, J.B.; Peterson, D.L.; Pearson, G.R.; Whitman, J.E. (May 2000). "Frequent HHV-6 reactivation in multiple sclerosis (MS) and chronic fatigue syndrome (CFS) patients". Journal of Clinical Virology. 16 (3): 179–191. doi:10.1016/S1386-6532(99)00079-7. PMID 10738137.
- Suhadolnik, Robert J.; Peterson, Daniel L.; O'Brien, Karen; Cheney, Paul R.; Herst, C.V.T.; Reichenbach, Nancy L.; Kon, Ning; Horvath, Susan E.; Iacono, Kathryn T.; Adelson, Martin E.; de Meirleir, Kenny; de Becker, Pascale; Charubala, Ramamurthy; Pfleiderer, Wolfgang (July 1997). "Biochemical evidence for a novel low molecular weight 2-5A-dependent RNase L in chronic fatigue syndrome" (PDF). Journal of Interferon & Cytokine Research. 17 (7): 377–85. doi:10.1089/jir.1997.17.377. PMID 9243369. Archived from the original (PDF) on 2017-08-13.
- Suhadolnik, R.J.; Reichenbach, N.L.; Hitzges, P.; Adelson, M.E.; Peterson, D.L.; Cheney, P.; Salvato, P.; Thompson, C.; Loveless, M.; Muller, W.E.; et al. (1994). "Changes in the 2-5A synthetase/RNase L antiviral pathway in a controlled clinical trial with poly(I)-poly(C12U) in chronic fatigue syndrome". In Vivo. 8 (4): 599–604. PMID 7893988.
- Suhadolnik, Robert J.; Reichenbach, Nancy L.; Hitzges, Patricia; Sobol, Robert W.; Peterson, Daniel L.; Henry, Berch; Ablashi, Dharam V.; Müller, Werner E. G.; Schröder, Heinz C.; Carter, William A.; Strayer, David R. (January 1994). "Upregulation of the 2-5A synthetase/RNase L antiviral pathway associated with chronic fatigue syndrome". Clinical Infectious Diseases. 18. Suppl 1: S96–104. doi:10.1093/clinids/18.Supplement_1.S96. PMID 8148461.
- Strayer, David R.; Carter, William A.; Brodsky, Isadore; Cheney, Paul; Peterson, Daniel; Salvato, Patricia; Thompson, Carol; Loveless, Mark; Shapiro, David E.; Elsasser, William; Gillespie, David H. (January 1994). "A controlled clinical trial with a specifically configured RNA drug, poly(I).poly(C12U), in chronic fatigue syndrome". Clinical Infectious Diseases. 18. Suppl 1: S88–95. doi:10.1093/clinids/18.Supplement_1.S88. PMID 8148460.
- Levine, Paul H.; Peterson, Daniel; McNamee, Faye L.; O'Brien, Karen; Gridley, Gloria; Hagerty, Mary; Brady, Jane; Fears, Thomas; Atherton, Martin; Hoover, Robert (1 October 1992). "Does Chronic Fatigue Syndrome Predispose to Non-Hodgkin's Lymphoma?". Cancer Research. 52 (19 Suppl): 55l6s–55l8s. PMID 1394166.
- Daugherty, Sandra A.; Henry, Berch E.; Peterson, Daniel L.; Swarts, Raymond L.; Bastien, Sheila; Thomas, Robert S. (January–February 1991). "Chronic fatigue syndrome in northern Nevada". Clinical Infectious Diseases. 13 (Suppl 1): S39–S44. doi:10.1093/clinids/13.Supplement_1.S39. JSTOR 4455801. PMID 1850542.
- Caligiuri, M.; Murray, C.; Buchwald, D.; Levine, H.; Cheney, P.; Peterson, D.; Komaroff, A. L.; Ritz, J. (15 November 1987). "Phenotypic and functional deficiency of natural killer cells in patients with chronic fatigue syndrome". The Journal of Immunology. 139 (10): 3306–3313. doi:10.4049/jimmunol.139.10.3306. PMID 2824604. S2CID 44286946.
