= Hélder =

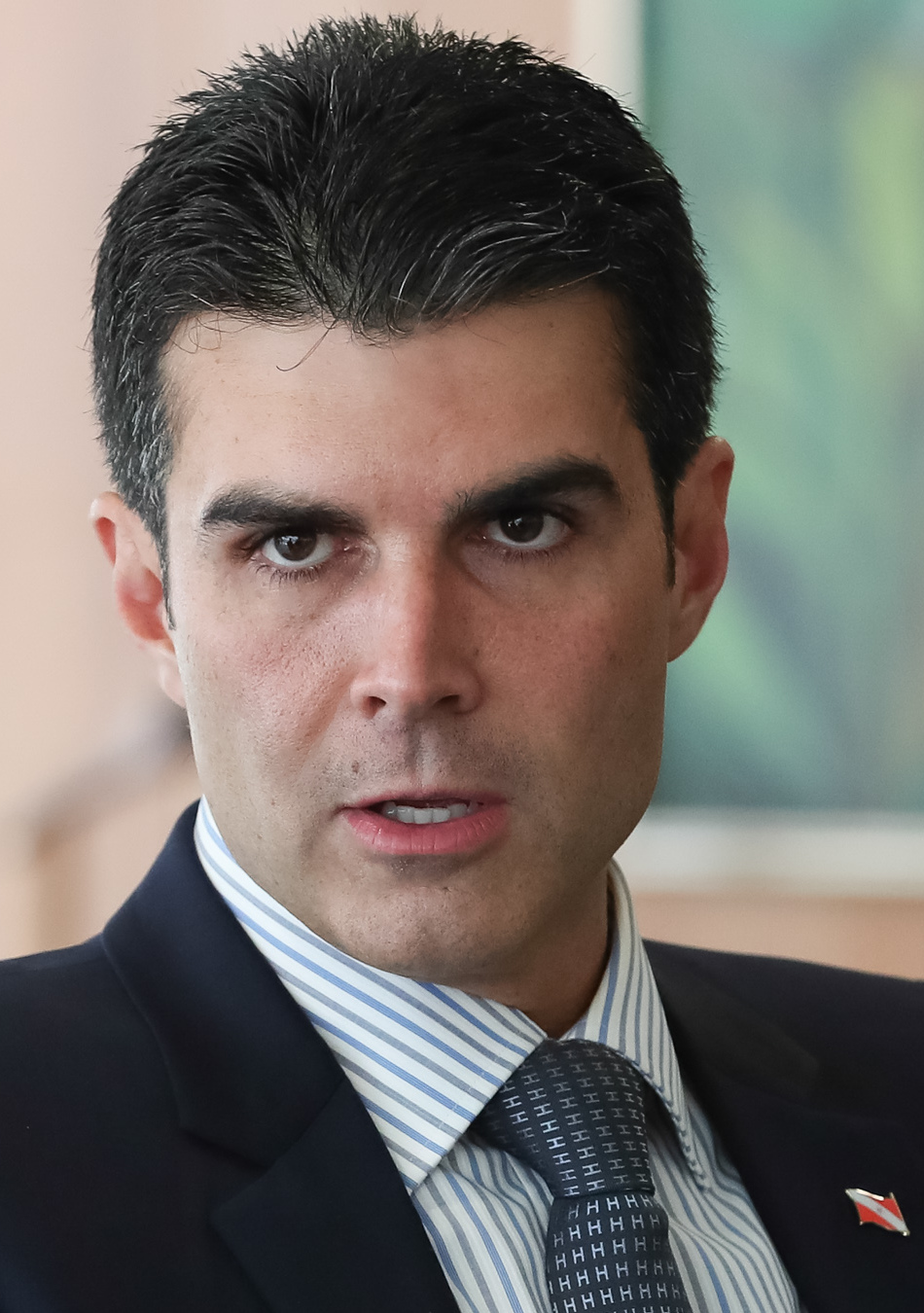
- Helder Barbalho
- Language: Portuguese

Other gender
- Feminine: Hilda

Other names
- Variant form: Helder (without accents)
- Related names: Hild, Held, Hidde, Hildus

Hélder is a Portuguese given name. It is extracted from the Germanic name Hildheri, composed of the Proto-Germanic elements hild ("battle" or "war") and hari/heri ("army"). Some modern etymologies relate the name to the Dutch word helder, which means "pure," "clear," "bright," or "clean/limpid."

There are several other possible etymologies for the name Hélder, such as the Germanic form Halidher, composed of the Germanic elements halith ("hero") and hari/heri ("army"). Another possibility is that it derives from the Old English word heldere, meaning "holder" or "bearer".

Hélder has received various Latinized forms, though they are rare: Helderius, Heldarius, Hilderius, Haliderius, Heldus, and even Hildus.

== Personalities ==
- Helder Antunes (born 1963), Portuguese-American executive
- Hélder Barbosa (born 1987), Portuguese footballer
- Hélder Cabral (born 1984), Portuguese footballer
- Hélder Câmara (1909-1999), Brazilian bishop
- Hélder Catalão (born 1955), Portuguese footballer
- Hélder Cristóvão (born 1971), Angola-born Portuguese footballer, often just called Hélder
- Hélder Costa (born 1994), Angola-born Portuguese footballer
- Hélder Costa (playwright) (born 1939), Portuguese dramatist, formerly exiled in Paris
- Hélder Muianga (born 1976), Mozambican football player
- Hélder Esteves (born 1977), Portuguese football striker
- Helder Francisco Malauene, Mozambican politician
- Hélder Macedo (born 1935), Portuguese literary scholar and writer
- Hélder Maurílio (born 1988), Brazilian footballer
- Hélder Prista Monteiro (1922–1994), Portuguese absurdist playwright
- Hélder Graça Neto (born 1982), Angolan footballer
- Hélder Postiga (born 1982), Portuguese footballer
- Hélder Lima Queiroz (born 1963), Brazilian zoologist
- Hélder Rosário (born 1980), Portuguese footballer
- Hélder Ribeiro Silva (born 1991), Brazilian footballer

== See also ==
- Helder (disambiguation)
