= Held =

Held may refer to:

== Places ==
- Held Glacier

== People ==
=== Arts and media ===
- Adolph Held (1885–1969), American newspaper editor, banker, labor activist
- Al Held (1928–2005), American abstract expressionist painter
- Alexander Held (1958–2026), German actor
- Anna Held (1873–1918), Polish stage performer
- Carl Held (born 1931), American actor
- John Held, Jr. (1889–1958), American illustrator
- Lexi Held (born 1999), American basketball player
- Louis Held (1851–1927), German photojournalist
- Ludwig Held (1837–1900), Austrian librettist
- Martin Held (1908–1992), German actor
- S. S. Held, French science fiction and fantasy author
- Tom Held (1889–1962), American film editor
- Zeus B. Held (born 1950), German music producer and musician

=== Education and academia ===
- David Held (1951–2019), British political theorist
- Madeline Held (1944–2020), British academic
- Virginia Held (1929–2026), American moral, social, political and feminist philosopher

=== Politics ===
- Heinrich Held (1868–1938), Minister-President of Bavaria
- Kurt Held (1897–1959), Jewish communist and writer displaced from Germany during the Second World War
- Marcus Held (born 1977), German politician

=== Science ===
- Friedrich Held (1812–1872), German malacologist
- Isaac Held, American meteorologist
- Richard Held (1922–2016), American cognitive psychologist

=== Sports ===
- Bud Held (born 1927), American athlete who competed primarily in the javelin
- Cornelis den Held (1883–1962), Dutch athlete
- Dan Held (born 1961), Canadian ice hockey player
- Franz Held (born 1948), German rower
- Henk-Jan Held (born 1967), Dutch volleyball player
- Lexi Held (born 1999), American basketball player
- Marcin Held (born 1992), Polish mixed martial artist
- Mel Held (1929–2024), American baseball player
- Oliver Held (born 1972), German football player
- Paul Held (1927–2019), American football player
- Sigfried Held (born 1942), German football player
- Woodie Held (1932–2009), American baseball player

== Arts, entertainment, and media ==
- De Held, a 2016 Dutch film
- Held (film), a 2020 American film
- Held (album), a 2012 studio album by Holy Other
- Held (novel), a 2023 novel by Anne Michaels
- "Held", a 1998 song by Smog from Knock Knock
- "Held", a 2005 song by Natalie Grant from Awaken
- HELD., a band featuring members of The Sleeping and Coheed and Cambria

== Other uses ==
- Held group, a sporadic simple group found by Dieter Held
- Held v. Montana, a United States court case regarding the environment

== See also ==
- Held for Ransom (disambiguation)
- Held up (disambiguation)
- John Held (disambiguation)
