= WPI =

WPI may refer to:

== Organizations ==
- Whittemore Peterson Institute, performs research into chronic fatigue syndrome
- Worcester Polytechnic Institute, a private research university in Worcester, Massachusetts, US
- Worker-communist Party of Iran, a political party
- Workers' Party (Ireland), two political parties
- Workplace Policy Institute, a lobbying organization operated by law firm Littler Mendelson

== Other uses ==
- Whey protein isolate, a dietary supplement created by filtering milk protein
- Wholesale price index, the price of a representative basket of wholesale goods
- Work Personality Index, a psychometric assessment
- Wraps per inch, a measure of thickness of yarn

== See also ==
- Derwent World Patents Index (DWPI)
