= Coyote Springs, Nevada =

Proposed community in Nevada, U.S.

Coordinates: 36.799595°N 114.924302°W

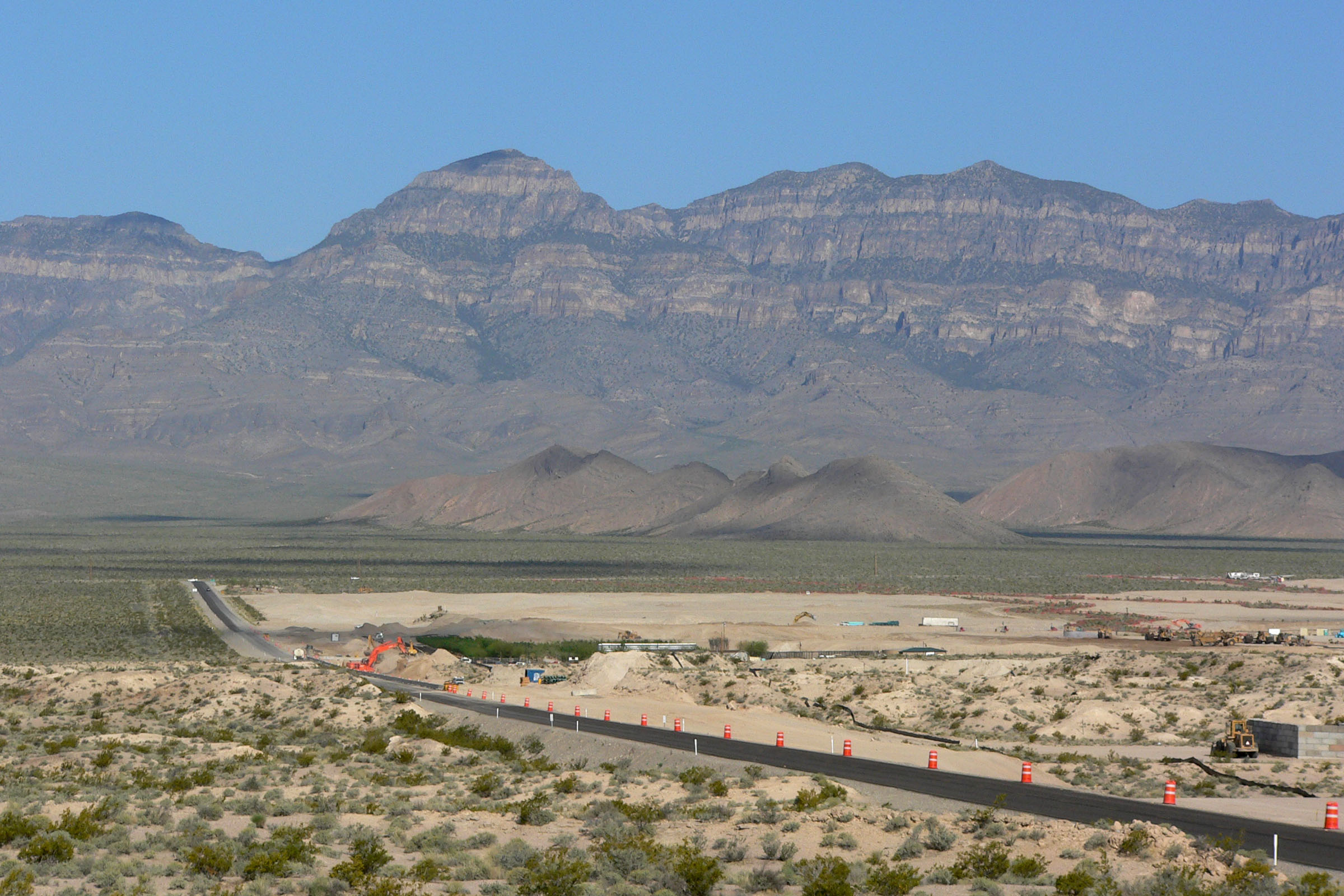
Coyote Springs development in 2006

Coyote Springs, Nevada, is an uncompleted master-planned community planned for development in Lincoln County and Clark County, Nevada. Plans called for 150,000 homes and businesses on 62-square miles north of Las Vegas. The community was initially planned by developer and attorney-lobbyist Harvey Whittemore and Pardee Homes. Thomas Seeno and Albert Seeno, Jr. became the sole owners of Coyote Springs following Whittemore's resignation from the Wingfield Nevada Holding Group amidst legal troubles. A golf course but no homes had been built by 2018, when the development was blocked by the Nevada State water engineer due to restrictions on the use of groundwater. In January 2024, the Nevada Supreme Court affirmed the authority of the water engineer to stop the development.

== Current development ==
A golf course designed by Jack Nicklaus has been constructed, but additional work was put on hold due to the economic recession in the United States and complex legal issues. The planned development has attracted controversy because of environmental concerns and allegations of political favoritism.

== Location ==
The community was planned to cover 43,000 acres (17,000 ha) or 65 square miles (170 km^{2}). While mostly in Lincoln County, initial development was planned for the Clark County portion of the land. Coyote Springs is located between U.S. Route 93 on the west and the Meadow Valley Mountains to the east, a drive of less than an hour from the City of Las Vegas and the Las Vegas Strip. The Coyote Springs valley is bisected by several major washes including the Pahrangat Wash and the Kane Springs Wash. The only access to the community is via U.S. Route 93 and Route 168. The ZIP Code for Coyote Springs is 89067.

== History ==
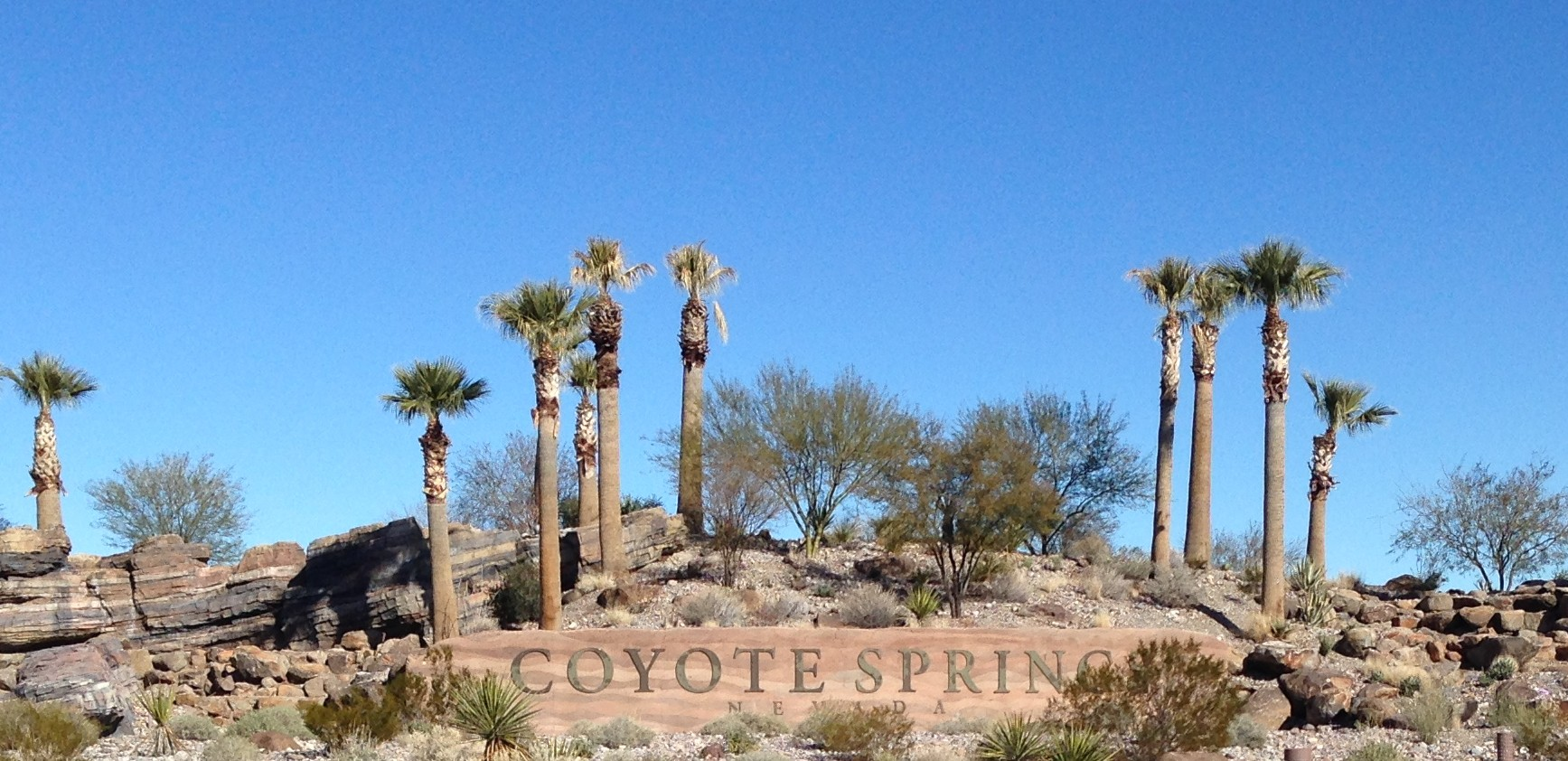
Coyote Springs entrance as seen from Hwy 93 in 2016

The land belonged to the Bureau of Land Management (BLM) until 1988, when Congress enacted the Nevada-Florida Land Exchange Authorization Act. This act authorized the exchange of approximately 29,000 acres of BLM-administered lands in Coyote Springs Valley (Clark and Lincoln Counties, Nevada), together with approximately 10,000 acres in Mineral County, Nevada, for approximately 5,000 acres of environmentally-sensitive private land in the Florida Everglades owned by Aerojet Corporation. The purpose of the trade was to provide habitat protection for recovery of ESA-protected species in Florida. The United States did not impose any use restrictions on the lands (fee simple) when conveyed to Aerojet, who originally planned to use approximately 2,700 acres to construct facilities for rocket manufacturing, assembly, and testing, but Aerojet never built the facilities. Aerojet sold the conveyed lands to Harrich Investments LLC in 1996, who in turn sold the Coyote Springs parcel to Coyote Springs Investment group in 1998 with the intent of building a planned community at the site.

Construction of a golf course, designed by professional golfer Jack Nicklaus, began in 2005; the course opened in 2008.

In 2009, BrightSource Energy announced plans to build a 960 MW (1,290,000 hp) solar thermal power plant within the development that would be on line by 2012. As of 2011, the project had not yet broken ground and the production start date had been pushed back to 2014 for the first stage, and 2015 for the second stage. In December 2013, Brighthouse was in court with Coyote Springs over costs associated with Brighthouse failing to perform this project.

Generators provided electricity until 2012, when an electricity substation was opened.

Construction on the community itself was planned to start following the official ground breaking held on July 5, 2006. Regulatory issues involving water rights and environmental issues delayed construction. An economic recession in the United States placed construction plans on hold. Progress was stalled further by various legal battles between the owning partners. As of September 2016, construction of the development had not begun.

== Legal issues ==
Coyote Springs has proven controversial because of environmental issues and allegations of perceived favors granted developer Harvey Whittemore by politicians including Senator Harry Reid. In 2012, Whittemore was convicted on three felony charges related to illegal campaign donations to Harry Reid.

Whittemore split from his business partners, Thomas Seeno and Albert Seeno, Jr., in 2010, resigning from Wingfield Holding Group and selling his stake in Coyote Springs. The Seenos had accused Whittemore of embezzling funds from the company, including improper use of Wingfield resources to support the troubled Whittemore Peterson Institute. Whittemore responded with a countersuit. Wingfield and Pardee Homes have also been engaged in legal battles.

In February 2009, the Center for Biological Diversity, an environmental advocacy group, announced plans to sue the United States Fish and Wildlife Service and the Bureau of Land Management (BLM) for violations of the Endangered Species Act. The center contends the Coyote Springs development and resultant loss of water resources and habitat would harm the desert tortoise and potentially hasten the extinction of the moapa dace, both endangered species. The Fish and Wildlife Service and Nevada's water authority responded that they, too, are interested in protecting the moapa dace, a small fish living in the Muddy River north of Las Vegas.

In May 2018, Nevada state water engineer Jason King blocked continued development of Coyote Springs. The Nevada state water department reaffirmed restrictions on groundwater pumping in the area in 2020, stating any new development in the area would place a "significant strain on the area's limited water resources." In January 2024, the Nevada State Supreme Court upheld the legality of water restrictions that stopped development of Coyote Springs.
