= Judy Mikovits =

Discredited American biochemist

- Born: Judy Anne Mikovits; April 1, 1958 (age 68)
- Education: University of Virginia (BA, 1980); George Washington University (PhD, 1991)
- Occupations: Former biochemistry research scientist, author of conspiracy literature
- Known for: Anti-vaccine activism, promotion of conspiracy theories

Judy Anne Mikovits (born April 1, 1958) is an American former research scientist who has made discredited medical claims, such as that murine endogenous retroviruses are found in blood samples of most patients with myalgic encephalomyelitis/chronic fatigue syndrome (ME/CFS). As an outgrowth of these claims, she has engaged in anti-vaccination activism, promoted conspiracy theories, and been accused of scientific misconduct. She has made false claims about vaccines, COVID-19, and ME/CFS, among others.

As research director of CFS research organization Whittemore Peterson Institute (WPI) from 2006 to 2011, Mikovits led an effort that reported in 2009 that a retrovirus known as xenotropic murine leukemia virus–related virus (XMRV) was associated with CFS and might have a causal role. However, following widespread criticism, the paper was retracted on December 22, 2011, by the journal Science. In November 2011, she was arrested and held on charges that she stole laboratory notebooks and a computer from WPI, but she was released after five days and the charges were later dropped.

In 2020, Mikovits promoted conspiracy theories about the COVID-19 pandemic via the internet video Plandemic, which made claims that are either false or not based on scientific evidence.

== Education and early career ==
In 1980, Mikovits received her BA degree in chemistry from the University of Virginia. According to Mikovits, she worked as a laboratory technician at Upjohn Pharmaceuticals in Kalamazoo, Michigan from 1986 to 1987, and departed after a dispute related to the company's bovine growth hormone product. In 1988, she worked as a laboratory technician at the National Cancer Institute (NCI) in Frederick, Maryland under Francis Ruscetti, who later served as her PhD supervisor, and in 1991 she received a PhD in biochemistry from George Washington University. Her PhD thesis was titled "Negative Regulation of HIV Expression in Monocytes". Mikovits stated that she worked as postdoctoral researcher in the laboratory of David Derse from 1993 to 1994. By 1996, Mikovits was employed as a scientist at Ruscetti's Laboratory of Leukocyte Biology at the NCI.

In May 2001, Mikovits left the NCI to work at EpiGenX Biosciences in Santa Barbara, CA, a drug-discovery company. By late 2005, Mikovits was working as a bartender at the Pierpont Bay Yacht Club in Ventura, California. In 2006, she became the Research Director of the Whittemore Peterson Institute, located in Reno, Nevada. After she published a paper in 2009, she became embroiled in controversy. She was fired from the Whittemore Peterson Institute in 2011.

== XMRV and myalgic encephalomyelitis/chronic fatigue syndrome ==
Harvey Whittemore and his wife, Annette, were frustrated by lack of answers for myalgic encephalomyelitis/chronic fatigue syndrome (ME/CFS) patients, including their daughter. In an effort to solve the CFS problem, they created the Whittemore Peterson Institute in 2005; Mikovits became the research director in 2006. Attempts to find a viral cause of CFS were unsuccessful.

In 2007, Mikovits met a co-discoverer of xenotropic murine leukemia virus–related virus (XMRV), Robert Silverman, at a conference. Silverman had found XMRV sequences, which are highly similar to mouse genomic sequences, in prostate cancer specimens several years earlier. Using tools obtained from Silverman, Mikovits began to look for XMRV in her CFS samples. In late 2008, a graduate student, who subsequently was hired as her technician, obtained two positive results from a group of twenty samples. He and Mikovits successively altered the experimental conditions until all samples gave a positive signal.

In 2009, Mikovits and co-workers reported in the journal Science that they had detected XMRV DNA in CFS patients and control subjects. Negative results were published soon after, disputing Mikovits's findings. Silverman, who was a co-author of the original XMRV-CFS article, told the Chicago Tribune that he was "concerned about lab contamination, despite our best efforts to avoid it".

Two of the original authors of this paper subsequently reanalyzed the samples used in the research and found that the samples were contaminated with XMRV plasmid DNA, leading them to publish a partial retraction of their original results. In December 2011, after a request by Silverman, the editors of Science retracted the paper in its entirety.

Lo and Alter, in their 2010 paper titled "Detection of MLV-related virus gene sequences in blood of patients with chronic fatigue syndrome and healthy blood donors", stated "Although we find evidence of a broader group of MLV-related viruses, rather than just XMRV, in patients with CFS and healthy blood donors, our results clearly support the central argument by Lombardi et al. that MLV-related viruses are associated with CFS and are present in some blood donors." This paper was also later retracted by the authors.

On September 29, 2011, Mikovits was terminated by the WPI due to disputes over the control of lab samples and the integrity of her work; she subsequently came under investigation for alleged manipulation of data in her publications related to XMRV. On November 18, 2011, she was arrested at her home in Ventura County, California, and jailed for five days based on WPI's allegations that she stole laboratory notebooks, a computer, and other material. She was held temporarily pursuant to that case, and her lawyer said the charges had no merit. By November 28, after negotiations with the WPI, some lab notes were returned. Later, the criminal charges brought against Mikovits in Washoe County, Nevada, were dismissed by the District Attorney and Assistant District Attorney in Reno, Nevada. The Washington Post later reported that the Whittemore family's legal troubles prevented the Washoe County from pursuing the case.

Mikovits and collaborators participated, with two other research groups, in a larger 2012 study with 147 CFS patients and 146 controls. The study concluded that there was no evidence of XMRV or MLV infection in either group, a result which Mikovits agreed was "the definitive answer" on the issue.

== Anti-vaccination activism and conspiracy theories ==
Mikovits has become a champion for believers in medical conspiracy theories, basing claims linking the XMRV to autism and cancer on other retracted papers, and claiming she had been jailed by the influence of the deep state and Big Pharma. This final claim refers to her arrest in 2011 for allegedly stealing research materials from WPI.

Mikovits has spoken at anti-vaccination events. She has claimed that retroviruses have contaminated 30 percent of vaccines.

Mikovits has received criticism from scientists for stating that XMRV is a communicable infection which is "clearly circulating through the population, as is our fear and your fear". Virologist Vincent Racaniello said that Mikovits's assertion "is just inciting fear". Mikovits showed slides at a conference linking XMRV to Parkinson's disease, autism, and multiple sclerosis. However, there is no published evidence that XMRV is associated with these conditions.

=== COVID-19 conspiracy theories ===
Mikovits gained attention on social media for promoting her ideas about the COVID-19 pandemic. She does not believe that a vaccine is needed to prevent COVID-19, and claims that the coronavirus was "caused by a bad strain of flu vaccine that was circulating between 2013 and 2015". She also claimed masks will "activate" the virus and reinfect a mask-wearer over and over.

One such circulating video gained notoriety in May 2020. Titled Plandemic: The Hidden Agenda Behind Covid-19, this film is a half-hour long documentary-styled interview of Mikovits's views on a variety of subjects. YouTube removed this video from its website a number of times, citing its Community Guidelines. It was later removed by Vimeo and Facebook for similar reasons.

David Gorski reviewed the video for his blog and remarked that "the amount of nonsense, misinformation, disinformation, and conspiracy mongering in Mikovits' response to questions is truly epic". The video was fact-checked by the website Maldita.es, which rated the claims she made as either false, or not based on evidence. PolitiFact described the video as "a deep dive into conspiracy theories about COVID-19, public health and the pharmaceutical industry". When asked to respond to eight questions prepared by the Center for Inquiry, Benjamin Radford and Paul Offit about the accuracy of Mikovits' claims, producer Mikki Willis initially agreed, but did not follow through when the questions were sent. As of December 2020, Mikovits had still not provided answers to these questions with Benjamin Radford noting "For an expert and filmmaker who claim to have been censored and silenced, Mikovits and Willis were strangely silent about answering legitimate questions."

When asked to comment on some of the allegations Mikovits makes against Anthony Fauci, the NIH and NIAID told NPR, "The National Institutes of Health and National Institute of Allergy and Infectious Diseases are focused on critical research aimed at ending the COVID-19 pandemic and preventing further deaths. We are not engaging in tactics by some seeking to derail our efforts."

== Published books ==
- Judy Mikovits et al. (2014), Plague: One Scientist's Intrepid Search for the Truth About Human Retroviruses and Chronic Fatigue Syndrome (CFS), Autism, and Other Diseases, Skyhorse Publishing
- Kent Heckenlively and Judy Mikovits (2020), Plague of Corruption: Restoring Faith in the Promise of Science, Skyhorse Publishing

== See also ==
- Cargo cult science
- Rashid Buttar
- Quackery
