= Harvey Whittemore =

American lawyer and businessman

Frederick Harvey Whittemore (born August 17, 1952) is an American lawyer and businessman in the Reno, Nevada area. As an influential lobbyist for the gambling, alcohol and tobacco industries, and for his own ventures, Whittemore was called "one of Nevada's most powerful men." In 2012, Whittemore came under grand jury investigation, initiated by the Federal Election Commission, to determine whether he should be indicted for breaking federal campaign contribution laws. He was charged with four felonies with convictions on three of the counts, and sentenced September 2013 to two years in prison. He was also given a $100,000 fine, along with two years supervision after his incarceration and 100 hours community service.

Whittemore was the president of Coyote Springs Investment, LLC, the land-development company behind Coyote Springs, a controversial $30 billion planned golf course community of 160,000 homes on 43,000 acres (17,000 ha) in the rural Nevada desert. Whittemore's close relationship with Senator Harry Reid came under scrutiny because of perceived legislative and political pressure favors allowing Coyote Springs to overcome regulatory problems.

Whittemore, whose daughter, Andrea Whittemore-Goad, is a chronic fatigue syndrome (CFS) patient, founded a research center known as the Whittemore Peterson Institute to investigate the condition. Members of the Institute notably claimed in 2009 that a mouse virus was the cause of CFS. The paper was retracted following widespread failure to replicate the finding, which was determined to be the result of laboratory contamination. Whittemore's business partners filed a civil suit against Whittemore, accusing him of improperly using company resources to support the institute.

== Background ==
Frederick Harvey Whittemore was born in Carson City, Nevada, in 1952, and was raised in Nevada and Arizona. He graduated from Sparks High School in Sparks, Nevada in 1970. Whittemore and his wife Annette met at their college, the University of Nevada, Reno, and married in 1973. Whittemore earned a J.D. degree from Arizona State University's Sandra Day O'Connor College of Law.

Whittemore's first experience with politics was the 1978 Nevada gubernatorial race, during which he established contacts in the Nevada political scene. He was hired by the law firm Lionel Sawyer & Collins as a lobbyist, where he advanced to senior partnership.

== Lobbyist/attorney ==
Whittemore frequently lobbied on behalf of industries including the Nevada casinos, liquor, and tobacco. He was called one of the most powerful men in Nevada, the most powerful casino lobbyist, and "the Lance Burton" of lobbying. State Senator William Hernstadt attributed Whittemore's success to his ability to command attention and respect, remarking, "when Harvey Whittemore speaks, the Nevada Senate listens." Whittemore also lobbied for his own ventures, both business and non-profit. His influence was diminished when the legality of his campaign contributions were scrutinized in 2012 by the Federal Bureau of Investigation, leading the Las Vegas Review-Journal to write that he was "now a pariah."

== Coyote Springs ==
Whittemore's land-development ventures included golf communities and Coyote Springs, a planned living community about 60 miles (97 km) north of Las Vegas on 43,000 acres (170 km^{2}) of desert land. First envisioned by Whittemore in the early 1990s, Coyote Springs is located in a large valley on the border of Clark County and Lincoln County and is slated to include 160,000 homes, twelve golf courses and several hotel-casinos. Its total cost has been estimated at $30 billion. The first golf course, designed by golfer Jack Nicklaus, opened in 2008. Home construction was expected to begin in fall 2012. Coyote Springs has been called a "marvel" and an "outrage." Whittemore considered the development an opportunity "to create a beautiful place which is unique in the world."

=== Regulatory impediments ===
Whittemore obtained land in the Coyote Springs Valley from a private owner but was unable to acquire all of the land or build on what he owned because of regulatory obstacles. The desert land included a sanctuary for the desert tortoise, an endangered species, and some of the adjacent land was designated a wilderness study area. A federal easement for utilities was also present, and the United States Environmental Protection Agency (EPA) would not allow building due to the presence of stream beds in the area. Water rights agreements were also needed to procure large amounts of water.

=== Controversy ===
Whittemore and his company successfully overcame most of the obstacles to development of Coyote Springs. A commentator at the Las Vegas Review-Journal called Whittemore's triumphs a "marvel." Politicians at the state and national levels have introduced legislation to benefit the project by removing some of the regulatory problems; in other cases, politicians reportedly exerted pressure on regulatory agencies to agree to Whittemore's projects. Journalists and advocacy groups questioned whether Whittemore's personal and financial relationships with political figures, particularly Senate majority leader Harry Reid, affected these developments.

==== Whittemore and Senator Harry Reid ====
A grand jury convened in late February 2012 to investigate alleged illegal campaign contributions by Whittemore to Harry Reid's re-election campaign in 2007. Whittemore, his wife, and company contributed tens of thousands of dollars to Reid's election campaigns and to Reid's leadership fund, which was used to aid Reid's allies and is said to have helped Reid attain his leadership position. Federal prosecutors alleged that Whittemore had promised money to Reid, and in order to conceal his involvement wrote checks to family members and 29 of his employees or their family members, who then contributed the maximum allowable amount to Reid. Whittemore was reportedly one of Reid's closest friends, and both men have characterized their relationship as close and decades long. Reid stated that he was unaware of the illegalities, noting that Whittemore's contributions were only a small portion of his war chest.

In June 2012 Whittemore was indicted by the grand jury. Whittemore was found guilty by a federal jury of three out of four felony charges in May 2013. He was sentenced on September 30, 2013, by U.S. District Court Judge Larry Hicks to two years in prison and given a $100,000 fine. He was also required to complete two years of supervision after his incarceration and 100 hours of community service. Whittemore completed his prison term on 2 May 2016, having served 21 months, including the last three at a halfway house.

Previously, Whittemore also funded the political campaigns of two of Reid's sons. All four Reid sons have at one time been employed by Whittemore's law firm. According to the Los Angeles Times, Whittemore helped advance the careers of two sons, including Leif Reid, Whittemore's personal attorney. Responding to allegations of favoritism, Reid's office stated that the Senator's behavior had been "legal, proper and appropriate."

==== Legislation ====
In 1998, Harry Reid and John Ensign, Nevada's past Republican Senator, co-sponsored legislation removing restrictions to the sale of federal wilderness lands in Nevada. Environmental groups, who initially supported the bill because of accompanying protection of mountainous areas, now say they regret their actions.

In 2002, Reid introduced "The Clark County Conservation of Public Land and Natural Resources Act of 2002", reclassifying land on or abutting Coyote Springs, moving a federal easement off Coyote Springs land and allowing Whittemore to make a land swap at no cost. Whittemore was eventually obliged to pay for the land after watchdog groups objected to the transfer provision. Reid achieved additional adjustments to the land's status in 2004 legislation. Reid has blocked funding to study the impact of underground water pumping on neighboring Utah.

==== Land swap objections ====
In 2006, two public lands issue groups sued the federal government over what they charged was an illegal land swap between the United States Bureau of Land Management (BLM) (an agency in the Department of the Interior) and Whittemore's Coyote Springs. The Western Lands Project and the Nevada Outdoor Recreation Association stated that the government had unlawfully exchanged almost 10,000 acres (40 km^{2}) of protected desert tortoise sanctuary for property owned by Whittemore himself. The Los Angeles Times reported that the swap consolidated and added to the value of Whittemore's holdings. The advocacy groups questioned the role of Whittemore's political allies in this decision and sought a restraining order. Whittemore responded to the filing by stating that neither Senator Reid nor his son Leif had affected the decision, and, along with the BLM, requested dismissal of the suit. District Judge Brian Sandoval declined to do so in 2007.

==== Alleged political pressure on the EPA ====
The United States Environmental Protection Agency initially refused to grant permits based on the projected environmental impact of destroying stream beds in the Coyote Springs Valley. In what EPA officials called an "unusual" move, Senator Harry Reid contacted the EPA administrator after a process including a phone call from his son Leif, Whittemore's personal attorney. Soon thereafter, the EPA came to an agreement with Whittemore and also awarded Whittemore's company an environmental sensitivity award. The prize was accepted by Leif Reid. Senator Reid's office denied any wrongdoing, but emphasized that Leif Reid should not have called his father on behalf of his employer.

==== Water rights issues ====
Environmentalists, residents of Utah and California and local ranchers fear negative consequences of Coyote Springs water usage, summarized by Las Vegas investigative reporter George Knapp as "pumping water in the teeth of a drought for golf courses." Water rights issues initially interfered with Coyote Springs progress, but agreements were reached. In coverage by Bloomberg, water rights attorney Greg James stated, "You need a large amount of money and some very powerful people to make water projects happen". Bloomberg notes that Harry Reid's son Rory is an employee of Whittemore's law firm and was the vice-chairman of the Southern Nevada Water Authority from 2003 to 2008. However, an opinion piece in the Las Vegas Review-Journal states that Rory Reid, who is also the Clark County Commission chairman, "bows out of all discussions and actions" related to Coyote Springs.

==== Other lawsuits ====
The Center for Biological Diversity, an environmental advocacy group, announced plans in 2009 to sue the United States Fish and Wildlife Service and the Bureau of Land Management (BLM). The center expressed concern about the environmental impact of agreements of the agencies and Whittemore's company, contending that the Coyote Springs development and loss of water resources and habitat would harm the desert tortoise and potentially hasten the extinction of the moapa dace, both endangered species. The Fish and Wildlife Service and Nevada's water authority responded that they, too, are interested in protecting the moapa dace, a small fish living in the Muddy River north of Las Vegas.

In 2007, Judicial Watch, a politically conservative watchdog group, sued the BLM for documents related to Coyote Springs. Judicial Watch alleged that Harry Reid and other Nevada politicians may have applied pressure improperly on behalf of Whittemore and Reid's son. Reid's office stated that there was no misconduct.

In 2004, Whittemore partnered with Thomas Seeno to lead the Wingfield Nevada Group, with Seeno paying for half of the company. Whittemore stopped his paid lobbying activities in 2005. In 2007, Seeno's brother Albert Seeno Jr. paid to join as partner, with Wingfield Nevada Group ownership divided in three but Whittemore holding management rights. That year, Wingfield initiated the Coyote Springs project, but a financial downturn in the housing market kept the project from moving forward. In mid-2010 Albert Seeno Jr. took over management of Wingfield, and he brought in his son, Albert Seeno III. Brad Mamer, right-hand man to Whittemore, said that under the new management, changes were made to Coyote Springs golf course without proper permits. The Seenos examined the company books in August 2010 and said that Whittemore was embezzling money and defrauding Wingfield. Whittemore said he lent Wingfield $30 million, and it was reported that Whittemore had borrowed $10 million from Thomas Seeno because of greatly reduced finances. Whittemore met with the Seenos in Reno, where, according to Whittemore, Albert Seeno Jr. threatened his life if he did not repay the Seenos.

On March 6, 2011, Whittemore reported to the Reno police that he was afraid of being killed, that Mamer had taken a phone call from Albert Seeno III who threatened Whittemore physically. Reno police took recorded statements from Whittemore in March and November. On January 27, 2012, the Seenos filed suit against Whittemore in Las Vegas on the grounds that Whittemore inappropriately used tens of millions of Wingfield's money to live luxuriously and to lobby politically, giving illegal campaign funds. A week later, Whittemore countered with a lawsuit asking for $1.8 billion in damages from the Seenos who he said were involved in extortion, grand larceny and racketeering.

He and the Seenos settled the civil suits in February 2013. The terms of the agreement were confidential.

== Whittemore Peterson Institute ==
Whittemore and his wife Annette, together with chronic fatigue syndrome specialist Daniel Peterson, established a CFS research organization known as the Whittemore Peterson Institute for Neuro-Immune Disease (WPI). A study conducted by the WPI reported in October 2009 that the so-called xenotropic murine leukemia virus-related virus was found in most CFS patients they tested, sending many patients to doctors for tests and drugs. Repeated independent attempts to replicate this result were unsuccessful. Additional studies found that the WPI results were the result of contamination with a laboratory recombinant virus and that there was no evidence that humans have been infected. The WPI paper was retracted.

The Whittemores contributed and raised funds for the institute in response to what they felt was a lack of action on chronic fatigue syndrome from the federal government. They also believed, along with Peterson, that CFS must be caused by a virus. The Whittemore's daughter, Andrea Whittemore-Goad, had been diagnosed with CFS at the age of 11. At 31, in 2009, she was reported to be very ill and has seizures. The Whittemores state that the only treatment with any effects was an experimental antiviral drug administered by Peterson. They envisioned a wider mission for WPI as a research and educational institute involved in patient care.

== Personal life ==
Whittemore and his wife Annette met at the University of Nevada Reno, and Whittemore credits Annette with influencing his choice of career. They have five children.
