= Jurkat cells =

Cell line

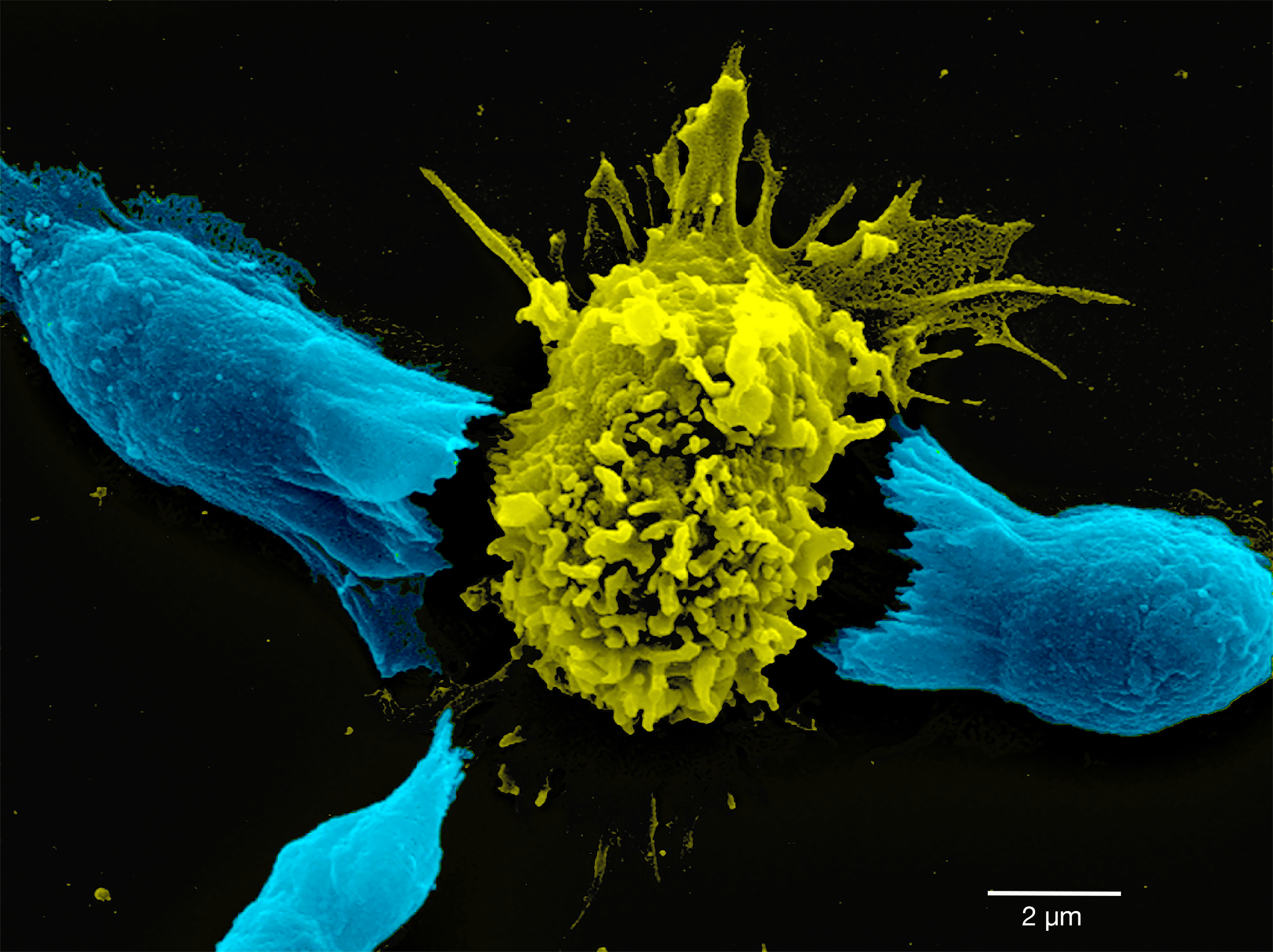
Jurkat cells (cyan) forming an immune synapse with a B cell, scanned by electron microscopy

Jurkat cells are an immortalized line of human T lymphocyte cells that are used to study acute T cell leukemia, T cell signaling, and the expression of various chemokine receptors susceptible to viral entry, particularly HIV. Jurkat cells can, upon stimulation by phytohaemagglutinin (PHA) or other stimulants such as phorbol 12-myristate 13-acetate (PMA or simply phorbol), express interleukin 2, and are used in research involving the susceptibility of cancers to drugs and radiation. However in the general case chronic phytohaemagglutinin kills Jurkat cells, though Jurkat clones can be devised which resist PHA-induced killing. The object of the system is that Jurkat cells can react to a signal and their expression can be measured. Jurkat cells with elements missing or knocked out can then provide a basis for examining the importance of that element on the expression of interleukin 2.

== History ==
The Jurkat cell line (originally called JM) was established in the mid-1970s from the peripheral blood of a 14-year-old boy with T cell leukemia. Different derivatives of the Jurkat cell line that have been mutated to lack certain genes can now be obtained from cell culture banks.

== Examples of derivatives ==
- The JCaM1.6 cell line is deficient in Lck activity due to the deletion of part of the LCK gene (exon 7) from the LCK transcript.
- J.RT3-T3.5 cells have a mutation in the T cell receptor beta chain locus precluding expression of this chain. This affects the cells in several ways; they do not express surface CD3 or produce the T cell receptor alpha/beta heterodimer. Since they are deficient in the TCR complex, these cells are a useful tool for transfection studies using T cell receptor alpha and beta chain genes and are widely used in labs in which T cell receptor gene transfer technologies are studied.
- The I 9.2 and I 2.1 cell lines. The I 2.1 cell line is functionally defective for FADD and the I 9.2 cell line is functionally defective for caspase-8, both defective molecules being essential to apoptosis or necroptosis of cells.
- The D1.1 cell line does not express the CD4 molecule, an important co-receptor in the activation pathway of helper T cells.
- The J.gamma1 subline contains no detectable phospholipase C-gamma1 (PLC-γ1) protein and therefore has profound defects in T cell receptor (TCR) calcium mobilization and activation of nuclear factor of activated T cells (NFAT, an important transcription factor in T cells).
- J-Lat contains integrated but transcriptionally latent HIV proviruses, in which GFP replaces nef coding sequence, and a frameshift mutation in env.
- E6-1 cells express large amounts of interleukin 2 after stimulation with phorbol esters and either lectins or monoclonal antibodies against the T3 antigen (both types of stimulants are needed to induce interleukin 2 expression.

== Cell line contamination ==
Jurkat E6-1 cells have been found to produce a xenotropic murine leukemia virus (X-MLV) (referred to as XMRV) that could potentially affect experimental outcomes. There is no evidence that this virus can infect humans. This infection may also change the virulence and tropism of the virus by way of phenotypic mixing and/or recombination.
