= Hold up =

Hold Up, hold up, or Hold-Up may refer to:

== Film ==
- Hold-Up (1974 film), an Italian film
- Hold-Up (1985 film), Franco-Canadian crime comedy
- Hold-Up (2000 film), Austrian film
- Hold-Up! (2012 film) (Spanish ¡Atraco!), Spanish-Argentine film directed by Eduard Cortés
- Hold-up (2020 film), a French documentary

== Games ==
- Hold up (bridge), a contract bridge playing technique

== Music ==
- "Hold Up" (song), by Beyoncé, from Lemonade (2016)
- "Hold Up", a 2012 song by Cash Out featuring Wale
- "Hold Up", a song by Chris Brown from Exclusive (2007)
- "Hold Up", a song by Demi Lovato from Unbroken (2011)
- "Hold Up", a song by Lil Wayne feat. T-Streets, from I Am Not a Human Being (2010)
- "Hold Up", a song by Marion Bands feat. Nipsey Hussle, from The Music of Grand Theft Auto V (2013)
- "Hold Up", a song by The Raconteurs from Consolers of the Lonely (2008)
- "Hold Up Hold Up Hold Up", a song by Young Dolph from Rich Slave (2020)

== See also ==
- The Holdup, an American reggae band
- Robbery
- Held up (disambiguation)
- Hold-up problem
- Hold-ups, stockings with an elasticized band at the top
