= Whittemore Peterson Institute =

Research institute at the University of Nevada, Reno

- Abbreviation: WPI
- Founded: 2005; 21 years ago
- Founder: Annette Whittemore, Harvey Whittemore, and Daniel Peterson
- Type: Charitable foundation and research institute
- Tax ID no.: 20-5904991
- Legal status: 501(c)(3)
- Purpose: Research and treatment of chronic fatigue syndrome, fibromyalgia, atypical multiple sclerosis, and autism
- Location: Reno, Nevada, U.S.
- Coordinates: 39.545873°N 119.819565°W
- President: Annette Whittmore
- Research director: Vincent Lombardi
- Subsidiaries: WP Biotechnologies
- Revenue: $562,771 (2018)
- Expenses: $495,744 (2018)
- Employees: 6 (2018)
- Volunteers: 15 (2018)
- Website: www.wpi.ngo

Whittemore Peterson Institute (WPI) is a 501(c)(3) nonprofit medical research institute dedicated to scientific discovery surrounding complex neuroimmune diseases including chronic fatigue syndrome (CFS) and other similarly presenting illnesses. Founded in 2005, it is currently located within the Center for Molecular Medicine at the University of Nevada, Reno. It was founded in 2005.

Whittemore Peterson Institute is a research institute and charitable foundation known for its claims that the retrovirus xenotropic murine leukemia virus–related virus (XMRV) is associated with and may cause CFS and a variety of additional diseases. A report by WPI scientists of an association between CFS and XMRV was forcibly retracted by the journal Science when the results could not be replicated, and it was discovered that XMRV was a laboratory-created recombinant of two mouse viruses. Amid allegations of sloppiness and scientific misconduct, WPI personnel criticised the methods and motives of other scientists, implying that the negative results were part of a "cover-up" or a "bias against this disease (CFS)".

WPI was created by the parents of a CFS patient, Annette and Harvey Whittemore, and by Daniel Peterson, an early researcher of the illness. Peterson left WPI in 2010 due to concerns related to the XMRV research. The institute is affiliated with the University of Nevada, Reno. Judy Mikovits joined as research director in 2006, but was terminated by WPI in October 2011 for not turning her work over to another scientist while also coming under investigation for alleged manipulation of data in her publications related to XMRV. WPI moved to the newly constructed Center for Molecular Medicine in August 2010.

== History ==
Annette Whittemore, co-founder and president of the institute, stated that the inspiration for the institute came from her daughter, Andrea Whittemore-Goad, who was diagnosed with chronic fatigue syndrome (CFS) at the age of twelve. Whittemore stated that numerous doctors were unable to help her daughter, and that the first major improvement came ten years after her diagnosis when she was treated by Peterson with the experimental antiviral drug Ampligen. Hemispherx's new drug application for Ampligen, which permits sale and marketing, was rejected by the FDA in December 2009 and the agency asked for another clinical study. Interviewed by The New York Times, Whittemore said that "she had long believed that the syndrome was an infectious disease, but that scientists had rejected the idea", and decided that, "if there was a place of our own where we could find the answers, we could do it more quickly." Her husband Harvey said that his wife also wanted to recognize Peterson for his history of treating the illness since 1984.

The Whittemores and Peterson established the Whittemore Peterson Institute in 2005. Research began in 2006 with the opening of a small laboratory and an office on the University of Nevada, Reno campus under the direction of Judy Mikovits. WPI registered as a 501(c)(3) public charity in 2006. The Institute opened a new facility in August 2010 in the University of Nevada's Center for Molecular Medicine. Daniel Peterson left the Whittemore Peterson Institute in 2010 because of concerns about the "singular pursuit of XMRV" that was conducted without his input. His name was added to the Science paper only after a reviewer's comment. Peterson was reported to be working with Jay Levy, one of the original discoverers of HIV, to try to determine whether XMRV was truly present in the same patients examined in the Science study.

== Organization and mission ==
Annette Whittemore serves as president and Institute Administrator of the WPI. Vincent Lombardi, first author of the 2009 Science paper, was appointed as Research Director in March 2011. Lombardi, a biochemist, along with Harvey Whittemore, co-founded RedLabs USA, Inc., now Viral Immune Pathology Diagnostics (VIP Dx). Virologist Judy Mikovits was the previous research director. Her employment was terminated in October 2011. The Institute has stated that their research unit is composed of scientists from the National Cancer Institute, the National Institute of Aging, the La Jolla Institute for Allergy and Immunology, and Kings College, UK.

The WPI's stated mission is to "bring discovery, knowledge, and effective treatments to patients with illnesses that are caused by acquired dysregulation of both the immune system and the nervous system, often resulting in life long disease and disability." The Institute considers such diseases as CFS, fibromyalgia, atypical multiple sclerosis and autism to be "Neuro Immune Diseases" with an underlying infectious or environmental exposure etiology. However, there is currently no expert consensus on the etiology of these diseases and conditions.

== Funding and support ==
Initial funding for the institute was provided by the Whittemores, who in 2004 committed $5 million, successfully lobbied the Nevada legislature for support and arranged an affiliation with their alma mater, the University of Nevada, Reno. The Nevada legislature agreed to provide $3 million, and additional funding was from private donations. $10 million was secured from the governor and legislature by the University of Nevada School of Medicine and the WPI for the Center for Molecular Medicine, where WPI would share space. Nevada senators John Ensign and Harry Reid separately introduced legislation requesting federal funding for the institute.

Supplemental funding for WPI came from the sale of XMRV diagnostic tests by Viral Immune Pathology Diagnostics (VIP Dx), owned by the Whittemore family, with all net proceeds donated to the WPI. In September 2009, WPI announced that Mikovits and collaborator Jonathan Kerr of St. George's College in London received a $1.6 million, five-year grant from the National Institute of Allergy and Infectious Diseases for their proposal to develop new "strategies to decipher the pathophysiology of chronic fatigue syndrome".

== Contradictory results and controversy ==
=== Background ===
Judy Mikovits was introduced to Annette Whittemore at an HHV-6 Foundation conference in the spring of 2006, and soon after was hired as the research director of WPI. Mikovits had left the National Cancer Institute (NCI) and moved to California to get married in 2001. As WPI research director, Mikovits attempted to find a connection between CFS and infections. She met Bob Silverman, the co-discoverer of XMRV, at a conference in 2007 and began to look for XMRV using Silverman's reagents. In late 2008, her team had two positive results out of twenty, and adjusted the experimental conditions until all twenty samples tested positive. Mikovits decided to focus all WPI resources on XMRV. She kept the project secret from Peterson and the Whittemores, fearful that skeptics would try to derail her work, but sent test samples to Bob Silverman and to the lab of her mentor at NCI, Frank Ruscetti. Mikovits submitted the first version of the Science paper in May 2009.

=== Science publication and response ===
In 2009, Lombardi et al. reported in the journal Science that they had detected XMRV DNA in 68 of 101 (67%) CFS patients, versus 8 of 218 (3.7%) healthy control subjects. Co-authors included Mikovits, her former mentor Ruscetti at the NCI, and Bob Silverman of the Cleveland Clinic. The WPI study was followed by worldwide media coverage, including reports by the BBC, National Public Radio, The New York Times and The Wall Street Journal. Discover Magazine listed it as one of the top 100 stories of 2009. Many CFS patients greeted the report enthusiastically, feeling that XMRV granted legitimacy to their condition and hoping that XMRV would be established as a treatable cause of CFS; some, assuming causation, even "hurry(ied) to doctors for tests and antiretroviral drugs". Others urged the need for more research before drawing conclusions. In the scientific community, initial reactions were mixed. Immediately after the Science paper publication, Patrick Moore and Masahiro Shuda wrote a highly critical F1000 dissent pointing out basic errors in the paper's methods, results and conclusions, "...this manuscript has flaws that leave the reader unsure of knowing precisely what was measured". Others noted the long history of proposed retrovirus-disease connections that were later debunked. John Coffin and Jonathan Stoye in a Science commentary accompanying the WPI publication were cautiously optimistic.

In September 2011, the original authors published a "Partial Retraction" of their 2009 findings, in which they acknowledged that "some of the CFS peripheral blood mononuclear cell (PBMC) DNA preparations are contaminated with XMRV plasmid DNA." In December 2011, Science retracted the 2009 paper.

=== Negative results ===
The first follow-up study was published in PLoS ONE in 2010; it was conducted in the UK and found no evidence of XMRV in CFS patients. The publication sparked what The Economist dubbed a transatlantic "fight". Supporters of the two teams traded accusations of conflicts of interest, technical sloppiness, and failure to care about patients. The Reno Gazette-Journal reported that Mikovits stated the PLoS ONE study team biased their study so as to not find the virus in its samples, and that Mikovits "suspected insurance companies in the United Kingdom are behind attempts to sully the findings of the Reno study". A steady stream of consistently negative results followed the PLoS ONE report. One study, later retracted, found no XMRV but did report evidence of murine retroviral sequences in the blood of some CFS patients. Mikovits and Ruscetti attributed the failure to replicate their results to the use of different PCR reactions and to the examination of patients who did not satisfy the same CFS diagnostic criteria. A study using the original reaction conditions did not detect XMRV in UK patients who "not only had CFS, but had considerable disability".

WPI has been included in a multi-center trial, led by Ian Lipkin, that is intended to settle the XMRV-CFS question conclusively. Samples from 150 CFS patients and 150 healthy but comparable donors are to be tested at WPI, the NIH, and the CDC. In the preliminary phase of this project, published in Science in January 2011, four patients initially tested positive at WPI and the CDC, but no XMRV was detected at NCI and no patient was positive after repeated testing.

=== Contamination ===
Some researchers were concerned about contamination from the first reports of XMRV-disease associations, and these concerns spread as study after study failed to replicate WPI's results. In December 2010, four independent articles published in the journal Retrovirology presented evidence that reported XMRV detection could be explained by contamination of laboratory reagents, tissue samples and blood. Samples that were positive for XMRV were also positive for mouse DNA contaminants. Furthermore, the striking identity of XMRV genomic sequences and their similarity to xenotropic MLVs in several human cell lines suggested that XMRV is not a transmissible human pathogen. The British Medical Journal responded with an article entitled, "Chronic fatigue syndrome is not caused by XMRV virus, study shows". A fifth study supporting the contamination hypothesis was published in February, 2011, just ahead of the 18th Conference on Retroviruses and Opportunistic Infections (CROI). At CROI, WPI representatives were absent, and a large amount of negative data was presented. Two groups showed evidence that XMRV is a recombinant of two mouse retroviruses, which infected a prostate cancer cell line during passage through nude mice. Virologist John Coffin, who had previously expressed optimism about the initial WPI data, declared, "It's all contamination." Robert Silverman, who was a co-author of the original XMRV-CFS article but is no longer collaborating with Mikovits, told the Chicago Tribune that he was "concerned about lab contamination, despite our best efforts to avoid it".

=== Controversial statements and criticism ===
The Whittemore Peterson Institute and its employees have issued statements that have generated additional controversy. Some of these statements have been made to the press, while others are made in presentations to patient groups. Although there is no consensus that XMRV is a human pathogen or even associated with any disease, Mikovits has stated her opinion that the virus "undoubtedly causes some of the symptoms that are associated with" CFS. Elsewhere, however, she notes that causation has not been proven. According to Mikovits, XMRV "is clearly circulating through the population as is our fear and your fear" and has entered the US blood supply. She has also associated XMRV not only with CFS, but also with autism, Alzheimer's disease, multiple sclerosis, and other diseases. There is no evidence that XMRV is associated with these diseases: all studies that have looked for a connection have produced negative results. Virologist Vincent Racaniello has accused Mikovits of "inciting fear".

In response to the contradictory British results, Mikovits stated that scientists had doctored their studies to reach a predetermined conclusion as part of an insurance company conspiracy. Annette Whittemore expressed the opinion that the response to her organization's claims was political, while the director of clinical services, Deckoff-Jones, characterized the negative research findings as a "cover-up and baseless attacks against Dr. Mikovits". Mikovits stated that those who reported negative findings did not "believe" in chronic fatigue syndrome and sought to discredit the disorder itself. Critics disputed these charges. A March 2011 editorial in the journal Nature praised Mikovits's defense of her work, but also asked her and her critics to keep an open mind and to be motivated by patients without allowing their scientific programme to be influenced by patients' beliefs.

WPI has also generated criticism for statements defending the use of antiretroviral medications as a treatment for CFS. For some individuals, these medications can have substantial side effects. Jay Levy states that taking anti-HIV medications is "not like taking an aspirin". There is currently no consensus that XMRV is capable of infecting humans, much less causing disease; the rush to prescribe antiretrovirals has been described as premature and based on "an unproven hypothesis". Another criticism is that even if XMRV did cause CFS and antiviral medications were effective against the virus, rigorous trials would be needed to establish safety, efficacy, and optimal dosing. Anecdotal treatments, they say, are unhelpful and possibly harmful to "the million or more individuals experiencing these serious conditions".

The editors at Science in May 2011 requested that the authors of the 2009 Lombardi et al. study retract the article due to many independent studies that did not find an association of XMRV with CFS, and studies that have presented data showing contaminated laboratory reagents may have led to false positive results. Science reported that Mikovits declined the request on behalf of the original authors, labeled the request "premature", and asserted that the original study results were accurate. The editor-in-chief of the journal Science subsequently published an expression of concern, "Because the validity of the study by Lombardi et al. is now seriously in question". In December 2011, Science retracted the 2009 paper.

=== XMRV testing ===
WPI was criticized for offering non-FDA-approved XMRV testing through its subsidiary, Viral Immune Pathology Diagnostics (VIP Dx), which was founded by WPI's Vincent Lombardi and was headed by Harvey Whittemore. The tests, which over 1,000 patients purchased, cost $249 to $450. Virologist John Coffin observed that the original paper established the virus neither as a cause of CFS nor as a viable marker; in a Science news article, Sam Kean notes that the utility of the test for a patient or a physician is unclear. VIP Dx asserted that it introduced its XMRV test as a more expert alternative after a different company began offering one. Lombardi argued that the test is useful and that their 36% positive test results support the science in the original paper.

=== Blood supply safety ===
Mikovits has stated that XMRV has "almost certainly entered the U.S. blood supply system, but did not know whether it would be susceptible to the same heat treatments that successfully kill off the AIDS virus in blood products." The Wall Street Journal has reported that WPI and other laboratories are participating in a United States federal working group to determine the prevalence of XMRV in the blood supply and the suitability of different detection methods. The WPI is also collecting blood from CFS patients who received their diagnosis after a blood transfusion and are planning to conduct their own study on XMRV blood transmission. The association between XMRV and CFS reported in Science prompted Health Canada, the New Zealand Blood Service, and The Australian Red Cross Blood Service to restrict individuals with CFS from donating blood in 2010. In June 2010, the American Association of Blood Banks recommended actively discouraging persons diagnosed with CFS from donating blood or blood components. Similar action was taken in Norway in December 2010, when the Norwegian health agency Helsedirektoratet issued a letter of caution to all the blood banks.
