= Plandemic =

COVID-19 conspiracy theory video and films

Plandemic is a trilogy of conspiracy theory films produced by Mikki Willis, promoting misinformation about the COVID-19 pandemic. They feature Judy Mikovits, a discredited American researcher and prominent anti-vaccine activist. The first video, Plandemic: The Hidden Agenda Behind Covid-19, was released on May 4, 2020, under Willis's production company Elevate Films. The second film, Plandemic Indoctornation, which includes more interviewees, was released on August 18 by Brian Rose's distributor of conspiracy theory related films, London Real. Later on June 3, 2023, Plandemic 3: The Great Awakening was released on The Highwire, a website devoted to conspiracy theories run by anti-vaccine activist Del Bigtree.

Upon its release, the first video went viral, becoming one of the most widespread pieces of COVID-19 misinformation, its popularity most attributed to online word-of-mouth. It was quickly removed by multiple online platforms, but this failed to stop its proliferation. The video also plausibly contributed to non-compliance with health protocols. Due to social media companies' preparedness for its release, Plandemic: Indoctornation received less attention.

Scientists and health professionals have criticized all the installments of the trilogy for their misleading claims, while Willis's filmmaking style employing various modes of persuasion has been cited as lending to a conspiratorial and brainwashing character of the film. Responding to the outcry directed at the first video, Willis expressed doubt about Mikovits's claims but continued to defend her, with Indoctornation being self-described as a "response video" to debunkers. The Great Awakening was also subject to debunking by fact-checkers.

== Background ==
The COVID-19 pandemic was caused by the virus severe acute respiratory syndrome coronavirus 2 (SARS-CoV-2), first identified in December 2019 in Wuhan, China, becoming a pandemic in 2020. Billions of people have contracted the disease and millions eventually died from it. As a result of the pandemic declaration, travel restrictions, social distancing measures, and many other precautions were enacted to try to prevent the spread of COVID-19 while vaccines were quickly developed and underwent phased distribution in most countries. Meanwhile, misinformation and conspiracy theories about the pandemic emerged, concerning the pandemic's scale, the virus' origin, diagnosis, and treatment. Among the popular conspiracy theory is that the virus is a bioweapon to control the population. Some people have claimed to have magical or faith-based cures for the disease.

Judy Anne Mikovits is a former American research scientist who is known for her discredited medical claims, such as the claim murine endogenous retroviruses are linked to chronic fatigue syndrome. Even prior to the pandemic, Mikovits was engaged in anti-vaccination activism and the promotion of conspiracy theories, and was accused of scientific misconduct. Prior to the release of Plandemic, Mikovits had expressed support for various COVID-19 conspiracy theories, claiming, for example, that the COVID-19 pandemic is a predictable flu season.

Mikki Willis (Note: Born 1967 or 1968) is a former model and actor who had been making several New Age documentary films and conspiracy videos. At age 25, he founded the New York/Los Angeles Theater of the Arts, where he made several experimental plays, before making his feature debut film, Shoe Shine Boys (1996). He owns a production company, Elevate Films, which operates under the 501(c)(3) non-profit Elevate Foundation, founded in 2006. At one point, it also operated a namesake film festival. He was also co-director, co-cinematographer, and co-editor of the documentary Neurons to Nirvana (2013), which makes therapeutic claims on psychedelics. Residing in Ojai, California, Willis has a wife and business partner, Nadia Salamanca, as well as two sons. He has a family YouTube channel, Elevate Family, where one of his videos encouraging young boys to be unashamed of their cross-gender interests went viral. In 2023, it was reported they were planning to launch an alternative learning center.

== Plandemic: The Hidden Agenda Behind Covid-19 ==
=== Summary ===
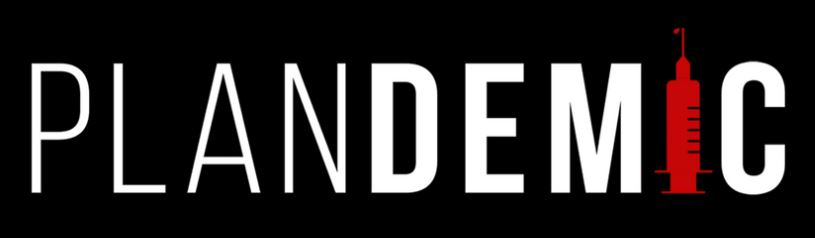
The logo used for the first video

The first installment of the trilogy, a 26-minute video titled Plandemic: The Hidden Agenda Behind Covid-19, promotes the conspiracist claim that vaccines are "a money-making enterprise that causes medical harm", exploring themes of the loss of free speech and free choice, also promoting parental autonomy against the pharmaceutical industry. It takes the form of an interview between Willis and Mikovits, who makes unsupported and false statements about SARS-CoV2, the disease it causes, and her own controversial history.

==== Fact-checking responses ====
Fact-checking website PolitiFact highlighted eight false or misleading statements made in the video:

- That Mikovits was held in jail without charge. Mikovits was briefly held on remand after an accusation of theft from her former employer the Whittemore Peterson Institute but charges were dropped. There is no evidence to support her statement notebooks removed from the Institute were "planted" or that the National Institute of Allergy and Infectious Diseases and its director Anthony Fauci bribed investigators. When asked, both Mikovits and Willis said it was an error to say Mikovits had not been charged; she had meant to say the charges were dropped. Mikovits later said "I've been confused for a decade" and that in the future she would try to be clearer when she talks about the criminal charge; "I'll try to learn to say it differently".
- That the virus was manipulated. This possibility is still being investigated. According to Nature magazine, "Most scientists say SARS-CoV-2 probably has a natural origin, and was transmitted from an animal to humans. However, a lab leak has not been ruled out, and many are calling for a deeper investigation into the hypothesis that the virus emerged from the Wuhan Institute of Virology (WIV), located in the Chinese city where the first COVID-19 cases were reported."
- That the SARS-CoV2 virus evolved from SARS-CoV-1 within a decade and that is inconsistent with natural causes. This is incorrect; SARS-CoV-2 is similar but is not directly descended from SARS-CoV (SARS-1), and the viruses have only 79% genetic similarity.
- That hospitals receive $13,000 from Medicare if they "call it COVID-19" when a patient dies. This statement, which had previously been made on The American Spectator and WorldNetDaily, was rated "half true" by PolitiFact and Snopes; payments are made, but the amount is open to dispute and there is no evidence this influences diagnosis. The evidence suggests COVID-19 may be under-diagnosed.
- That hydroxychloroquine is "effective" against coronaviruses. This statement originates in work by Didier Raoult that subsequently received a "statement of concern" from the editors of the scientific journal in which it was published. The first randomized controlled trial to evaluate the efficacy of hydroxychloroquine for the treatment of COVID-19 found no evidence of benefit and some evidence of harm. The NIH said there is insufficient evidence to recommend for or against its use to treat COVID-19. As of May 7, 2020, other bodies were running additional controlled trials to investigate hydroxychloroquine's safety and efficacy.
- That flu vaccines increase the chance of contracting COVID-19 by 36%. This statement is false; it misinterprets a disputed article that studied the 2017–2018 influenza season, predating the COVID-19 pandemic. The statement the flu vaccine increases the chance of contracting COVID-19 does not appear in the original article. The article's author Greg G. Wolff said coronavirus cases increased from 5.8% (non-vaccinated) to 7.8% (vaccinated) with an odds ratio of 1.36, with (1.14, 1.63) 95% confidence interval, and the article highlight said; "Vaccinated personnel did not have significant odds of respiratory illnesses". The article refers to seasonal coronaviruses that cause the common cold, but COVID-19 was added by the website disabledveterans.org.
- That despite the goal of preventing coronaviruses, flu vaccines contain coronaviruses. In reality, there are no vaccines with coronaviruses.
- That "Wearing the mask literally activates your own virus. You're getting sick from your own reactivated coronavirus expressions." This statement is unsupported by evidence. Masks prevent airborne transmission of the virus, especially during the up-to-14-day asymptomatic period when carriers may not be aware they have the disease. A virus may be deactivated, but cannot add to one's infection level if it leaves the body, even temporarily.

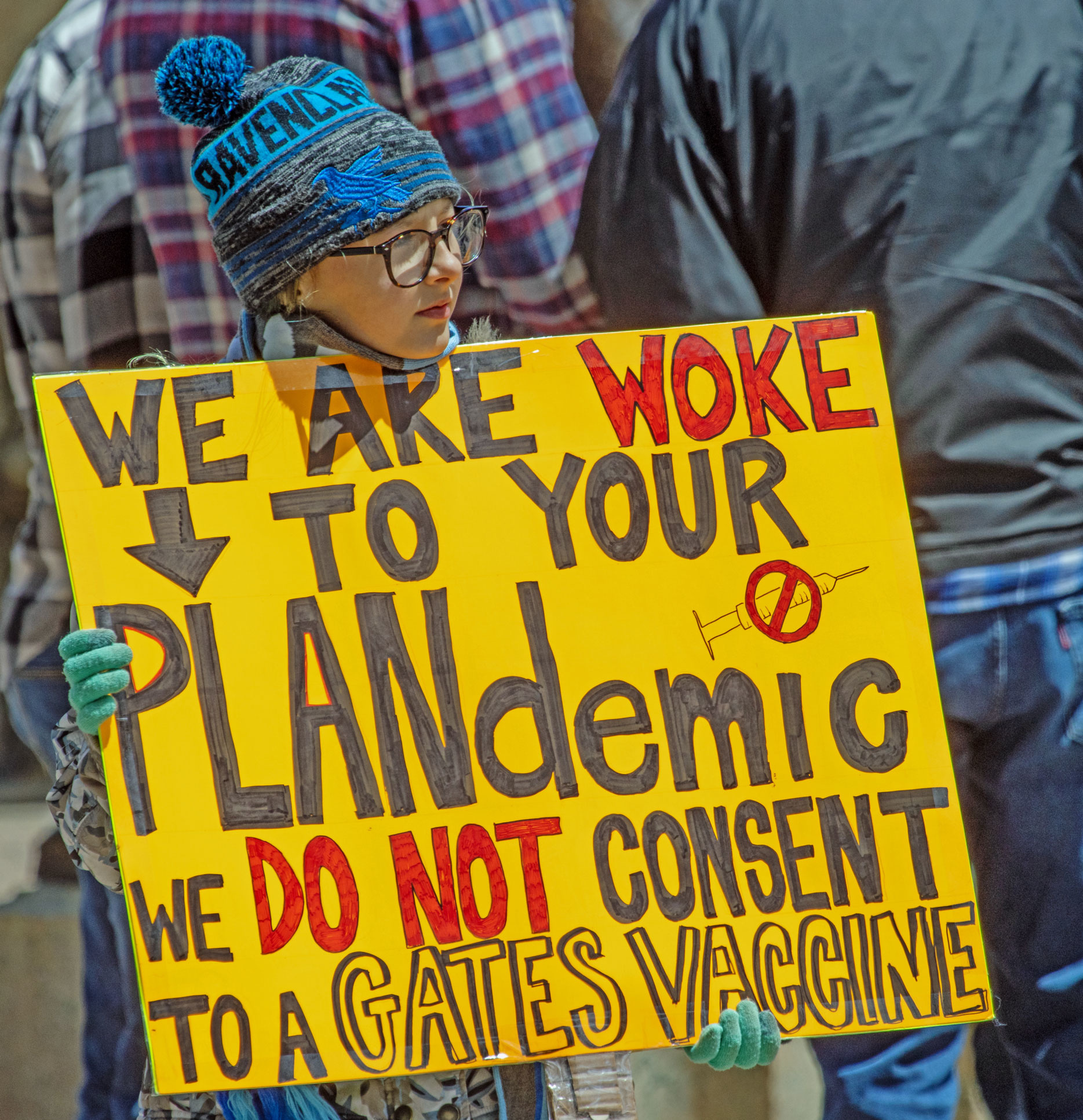
A child protesting COVID-19 vaccines with the word plandemic at Franklin County, Ohio

The journal Science also repeats some of the statements made by PolitiFact and fact-checked some of Mikovits's and Willis's other statements:

- That Italy's COVID-19 epidemic is linked to influenza vaccines and the presence of coronaviruses in dogs. There is no relation between these.
- That SARS-CoV-2 was created "between the North Carolina laboratories, Fort Detrick, the U.S. Army Medical Research Institute of Infectious Diseases, and the Wuhan laboratory". Considering relations between the US and the Wuhan lab stopped, the claim is false.
- That Mikovits is not anti-vaccine. According to Science, she once wore a piece of Vaxxed II merchandise promoting the 2019 sequel to a 2016 film that says MMR vaccines cause autism and that she once sent Science a PowerPoint presentation calling for an "immediate moratorium" for "all vaccines".
- That the Department of Health and Human Services (HHS) "colluded and destroyed" Mikovits's reputation, and that the Federal Bureau of Investigation (FBI) kept this secret but did nothing to help her. Science said, "Mikovits has presented no direct evidence that HHS heads colluded against her".
- That Mikovits's article on Science "revealed that the common use of animal and human fetal tissues was unleashing devastating plagues of chronic diseases", which the article does not say.
- That Mikovits's Ph.D. thesis Negative Regulation of HIV Expression in Monocytes "revolutionized the treatment of HIV/AIDS"; the thesis "had no discernible impact on the treatment of HIV/AIDS".

Mikovits also alludes to several conspiracy theories that state Bill Gates is implicated in causing the pandemic to profit from an eventual vaccine, and makes false and unsupported statements such as the claim that beaches should remain open because of "healing microbes in the saltwater" and "sequences" in the sand that can "protect against the coronavirus". The video states the numbers of COVID-19 deaths are purposely being misreported to control people. External videos, such as one in which a chiropractor says tonic water can treat or prevent COVID-19 and one of a press conference among doctors Dan Erickson and Artin Massihi in Bakersfield, California, says the COVID-19 pandemic is over-hyped. These external videos were also disputed beforehand.

=== Production ===
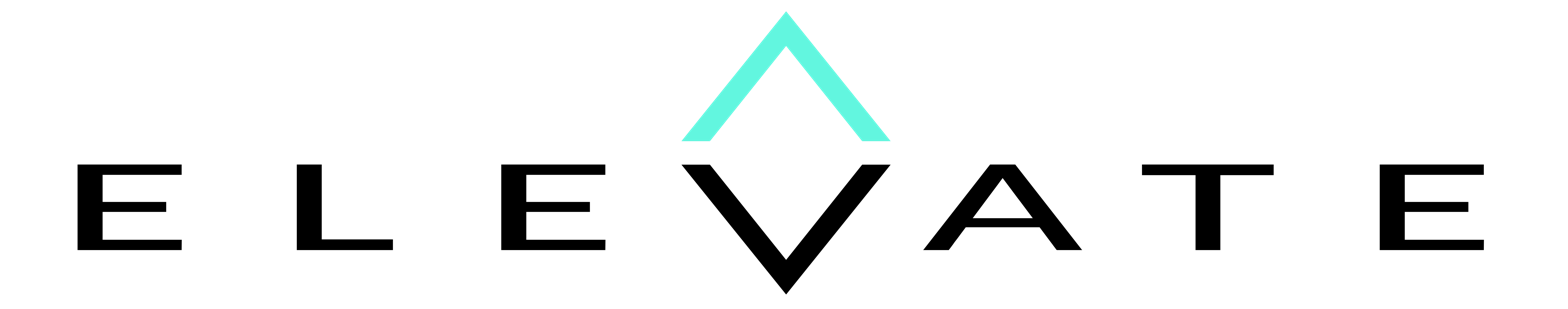
Logo of Elevate Films, the production company for the first video

According to Willis, producing Plandemic was a struggle. At that time, he was aware getting involved in controversial topics would risk his reputation and would likely embroil him in heated discussions. "And of course there's been tons of it. I've just been navigating all of that", he told the Los Angeles Times. Willis's concern arose from his perception of the pharmaceutical industry's corruption, a concern that began with the deaths of his mother from cancer and of his brother from AIDS during his 20s.

Willis met Mikovits for the first time in 2019, via mutual friends. Willis told the Ojai Valley News: "Because of [Mikovits's] direct connection with [those] involved with the pandemic ... I reached out to her for advice. We met, had a meeting, and what she revealed to me I knew the world needed to know." Principal photography took a day and editing took two weeks. Willis said he stopped editing a "socially conscious" documentary film he produced in 2019, arguing Plandemic was urgent. He was unsure whether to make a continuation. After hiring a cinematographer and researcher to join the project, Willis calculated it had a budget at less than US$2,000.

Willis, a low-budget filmmaker who was 52 years old at the time of Plandemic's release, teamed up with Salamanca to market the video; among their efforts were creating an Instagram account. They intentionally chose conspiratorial branding to gain attention. The project's title, a portmenteau of plan and pandemic, was the most popular choice in a Facebook poll conducted by Willis; runners-up were The Invisible Enemy and The Oath.

=== Release ===
Plandemic: The Hidden Agenda Behind Covid-19 was released on May 4, 2020. It was promoted by American far-right conspiracy theorist Alex Jones on InfoWars, and spread virally on social media, garnering millions of views, making it one of the most widespread pieces of COVID-19 misinformation. "Judy Mikovits" became a trending search on Google for two days. Two weeks prior to release, 30,368 tweets used the term "plandemic", most of which were merely retweets. After the video's release, the word "plandemic" was used 155% more on Twitter. According to CrowdTangle, QAnon Facebook groups endorsed the video. A Facebook spokesman recalled its hired fact-checkers wasting a huge amount of time to verify the video's claims, partly due to its duration and the number of claims. Before being removed, one of the videos featuring the work attracted one million views. Despite its removal, viewings of the video on the original site continued.

A YouTube spokesperson said the platform would remove videos supporting the claims of Plandemic without sufficient evidence, saying "[s]uggesting that wearing a mask can make you sick could lead to imminent harm". Vimeo's Trust & Safety team removed the video for violating its policies on misinformation; Twitter said hashtags like #PlagueofCorruption (Note: The title of a book Mikovits co-authored, Plague of Corruption: Restoring Faith in the Promise of Science) and #PlandemicMovie had been blacklisted and that not all of Mikovits's attempts to spread propaganda on the platform violated its policies. By the time the video was removed from Facebook, it had been watched 1.8 million times, had attracted 17,000 comments, and had been shared nearly 150,000 times. On TikTok, the video continued to find popularity via excerpted clips, some of which were removed from the platform. Google Drive and the Internet Archive were also used to spread the video; the former removed the files after being notified by The Washington Post.

According to Zarine Kharazian, assistant editor of the Atlantic Council's Digital Forensic Research Lab, as the film was removed from mainstream social media platforms, a "censorship backfire" that was characterized as a form of Streisand effect occurred; links to copies were promoted on alt-tech platforms—some of which were designed to host controversial content—were shared, with people's interest attracted by the video's perceived taboo nature. On Facebook, posts flagged as misinformation are more likely to be spread than those ignored. Shahin Nazar and Toine Pieters of the journal Frontiers in Public Health called the marketing campaign of encouraging people via decentralized social media to propagate the anti-vaccine belief "sophisticated", noting that it might have been a major contributor to the lack of compliance towards health protocols. According to The Verge, end-to-end encrypted services like WhatsApp and private groups meant the video was still being spread, unbeknown to the public.

=== Reception ===
The atmosphere, cinematography, and score of Plandemic are said to be what makes the claims stated sound convincing. Pictured is a cutaway during the video's opening scene.

Scientists, medical doctors, and public health experts condemned Plandemic: The Hidden Agenda Behind Covid-19 for promoting misinformation and NBC News called it "a hodgepodge of conspiracy theories". Governmental organizations, including the Indonesian COVID-19 Task Force, also labeled the video as a hoax, describing it as brainwashing and a red herring to divert the public's attention from real issues. Experts like specialist disinformation reporter Marianna Spring and disinformation researcher Erin Gallagher said the video's professionally crafted atmosphere, cinematography, and ominously dramatic score made the stated claims sound true; according to Spring; "That makes them as dangerous—if not more so—than advice with a mix of truth and misleading medical myths".

Science journalist Tara Haelle described the video as pseudoscientific propaganda and said it succeeded at promoting misinformation because it plays on the viewers' confusion and desperation for answers. The opening sequence best targets people unfamiliar with Mikovits, painting her as the scientific industry's underdog, giving a good first impression on her. and editing, The video also uses various modes of persuasion such as the Gish gallop (giving excessive arguments to sound convincing), as well as scientific-looking images and "harrowing" stock footage of dying people during the AIDS scene. Writing for the Deseret News, Amy Iverson expressed sympathy for those who stumbled upon the video in search for "someone to blame" for the effects of the pandemic, however noted "we cannot turn to outrageous, unchecked claims from a few loud voices to ease our concerns. And we definitely should not spread their unsubstantiated claims."

Meanwhile, the British musician Seal expressed love for the video and called the responses to it unjustified. Other public figures including the mixed martial arts fighter Nick Catone, spread the video's misinformation and Melissa Ackison, a Republican politician, supported the video. The video's legacy continues long after its release; in February 2021, The Washington Post reported an anti-mask Facebook page called "Shop Mask Free Los Angeles" used Plandemic: The Hidden Agenda Behind Covid-19 to support its claims. By this time, the Post reported some of the links had suffered from link rot.

The Los Angeles Times contacted yoga teacher and author Shiva Rea, who was a member of the board of directors of the Elevate Foundation; Rea stated she was not associated with the foundation or the film, and found Plandemic: The Hidden Agenda Behind Covid-19 to be "very disturbing".

==== Mikki Willis's response ====
Willis said that although he expected the provocative marketing to garner interest, the actual scope of popularity was unexpected. Speaking to the Los Angeles Times, Willis said he is not anti-vaccine and that he was merely trying to "start a conversation about science". He described himself as open-minded; "I have a profound love and respect of doctors despite how many doctors are mad at me now". Willis said he is also skeptical of Mikovits's claims in the video; "We're working very hard right now to validate the majority of the claims that were made" and expressed a willingness to be involved in civil discussions with doctors "on all sides".

ProPublica health care reporter and investigative journalist Marshall Allen contacted Willis, who said Plandemic "is not a piece that's intended to be perfectly balanced". When asked whether Plandemic might be fairly called propaganda, he said the definition fits, although he did not feel it contains anything misleading. According to Allan, "based on [the definition of propaganda], [Willis] feels 100% of news reporting is propaganda".

The Center for Inquiry's (CFI) Benjamin Radford and researcher Paul Offit asked Willis eight questions about the accuracy of the claims made in the video, either asking for evidence and clarification or asking questions such as "considering that bacteria don't kill viruses, how would 'healing microbes' reduce or treat coronavirus infection?" Willis agreed to answer all of the questions but he never did. Radford said on the CFI's website:

If the claims made by Mikovits and Willis in Plandemic are based in truth and facts, you'd think they would be eager to offer evidence supporting their claims. What better way to turn the tables on scientists, skeptics, and journalists than to offer a referenced, fact-based, point-by-point rebuttal to critics who offer them a platform? ... Where are their responses? Why are they suddenly so quiet? Why are they afraid to answer questions? What do they have to hide?

== Plandemic: Indoctornation ==
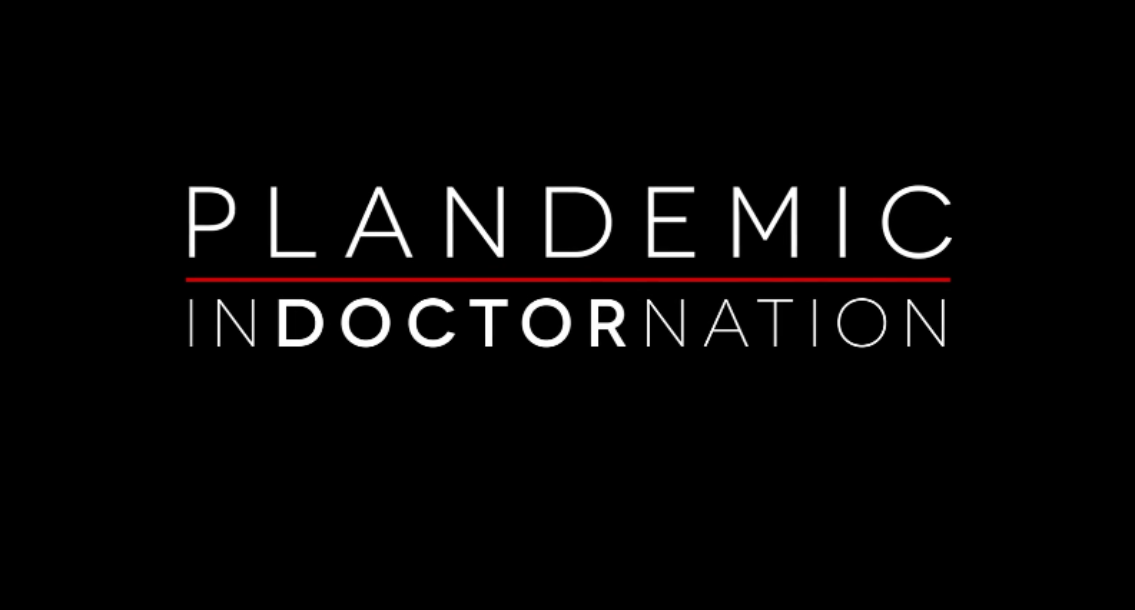
Plandemic: Indoctornation's logo

=== Summary and fact check ===
The second installment, an 84-minute film titled Plandemic: Indoctornation (Note: The word "Doctor" is highlighted in the logo as a play of the word "indoctrination") was released on August 18, 2020. Willis said the film is a "response video to all the debunkers", and that he worked with a coalition of 7,000 doctors and attorneys to make the film to "reform our medical systems such that they're not under the stranglehold of Big Pharma". PolitiFact categorized it as a pseudo-documentary.

The film says there is a worldwide conspiracy seeking to control humanity through fear and to make money for the putative conspirators; the COVID-19 pandemic is described as a key moment in a decades-long plan. The film says people and institutions including the Centers for Disease Control and Prevention (CDC), Google and the fact-checking agencies it employs, climate scientists, John Oliver, and Bill Gates coordinate with each other to enact the conspiracy.

Plandemic: Indoctornation says COVID-19 was engineered in a laboratory, that Event 201—a 2019 disaster response exercise—was a plan to release a real virus into the population, and that the Bill & Melinda Gates Foundation was ejected from India. The film also says a defensive patent applied by the CDC during the 2003 SARS outbreak was meant to "[control] the proprietary rights to the disease, to the virus, and to its detection and all of the measurement of it". These were later unproven; Event 201 was not a virus conspiracy plot, and the Bill & Melinda Gates Foundation does not have technology allowing it to covertly implant an invisible proof of vaccination. The CDC's defensive patent covers the genetic material detection methods for human coronaviruses so "public research and communication were not jeopardized by commercial parties seeking exclusive private control".

=== Production and release ===
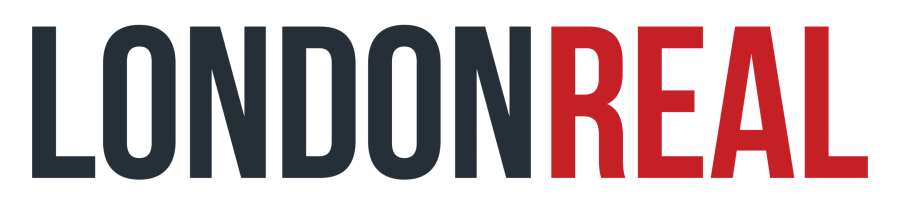
Logo of distributor London Real

Immediately after the release of Plandemic: The Hidden Agenda Behind Covid-19, Willis said he was contacted by an independent producer who said he had worked on projects with HBO, Netflix, and Amazon. The producer asked Willis if he had an interest in collaborating on making a feature-length version, though the Los Angeles Times found the companies had expressed no interest in the film. Soon after Plandemic's release, another set of teams announced the clips from Plandemic: The Hidden Agenda Behind Covid-19 would be part of a documentary feature film.

Plandemic: Indoctornation was released by an online distributor called London Real on the website Digital Freedom Platform, which has promoted several discredited theories about the COVID-19 pandemic, and was founded and managed by podcaster Brian Rose. Because the film's release was promoted in advance, social media platforms were able to prepare for its release rather than scrambling to react to misinformation already circulating on their networks. As part of their policy to counter disinformation about the pandemic, Facebook, Twitter, and other platforms took steps to limit the spread of the film as soon as it was posted, affixing warnings to links shared by users. YouTube removed multiple copies of the film and sixteen clips presenting specific sections from its servers. Although no steps to block the content were taken, Facebook warned users when clicking the film's URL, which was blacklisted by TikTok and Instagram.

According to London Real, Plandemic: Indoctornation was watched 1.2 million times by the end of its first day of release but the Digital Forensic Research Lab called the film "a total flop" that achieved much less social media engagement than the original video. Because social media companies were forewarned by the viral nature of the first video, the distribution of Plandemic: Indoctornation was limited. The Daily Dot said the only platform where it succeeded in getting exposure was Facebook, where it had 4,000 views of posts linking to the film on BitChute, where it had 40,000 views.

=== Reception ===
Critics compared Plandemic: Indoctornation unfavorably with the first video. Jane Lytvynenko at BuzzFeed News gave it zero stars, saying while the first video presents a protagonist (Mikovits) and a fairly clear narrative, the film does neither: it is "bloated, confused, and filled with nonsense", switching between topics without clearly establishing how all the information presented relate to each other. Its subjects are said to be cliché with respect to the first video. Lytvynenko said Willis's initial claim 'the first video is a trailer for a feature film is incorrect; while Plandemic: Indoctornation discusses the same themes and includes Mikovits, most of the material in the first video is not used in the feature-length film.

== Plandemic 3: The Great Awakening ==
Willis teamed up with Del Bigtree, the founder of the anti-vaccination group Informed Consent Action Network, to release another film, Plandemic 3: The Great Awakening on Bigtree's website The Highwire. In February 2023, a rough cut was screened at the "Rabbit Room" section of the 21st Conscious Life Expo in Los Angeles, a New Age and far-right conspiracy event where he won a humanitarian award in 2008. The trailer was released on May 23, 2023, and the film itself on June 3. Its promotional tagline, placed at a "slick" official website, is "100% Censored, 0% Debunked." The fact-checking organization Logically reported that the trailer had earned two million views on Twitter as of May 31. The 101-minute film is said to be dedicated to conspiracy theorist G. Edward Griffin, with archival clips of him used sporadically.

The film begins with Willis claiming that his AIDS-infected brother died of consuming the treatment drug zidovudine. PolitiFact and Agence France-Presse found no evidence that it caused the deaths of AIDS patients. The clip circulated in Instagram, but was then flagged by parent company Meta. Willis then says that COVID-19 lockdowns are "synchronized tyranny" aimed at controlling the masses. The trailer includes out-of-context clips of world leaders and politicians discussing the Great Reset at the World Economic Forum (WEF), and features personalities who have promoted misinformation about the pandemic and vaccines, including Ghent University professor Mattias Desmet and Vladimir Zelenko. (Note: The film is also dedicated to the late Zelenko, per the end credits) The film also misleadingly depicts WEF founder Klaus Schwab as creating a "purported plot for a unified world government" as well as being a Nazi due to him being born in Nazi Germany. It also falsely covers the George Floyd protests (additionally calling Black Lives Matter a pro-communist organization), antifa protests, and a Washington state bill regarding gender-affirming surgery.

== See also ==
- Protests over responses to the COVID-19 pandemic
- Timeline of the COVID-19 pandemic

=== Similar films ===
- The Other Side of AIDS (2004), a film also alleging that HIV does not cause AIDS and that HIV treatments are harmful
- House of Numbers: Anatomy of an Epidemic (2009), another HIV-AIDS conspiracy film
- The Greater Good (2011), a film also alleging that MMR vaccines cause autism
- Hold-up (2020), another film promoting COVID-19 misinformation
- Planet Lockdown (2020), another COVID-19 misinformation film
- Medical Racism: The New Apartheid (2021), a video targeting with the African American community
- Died Suddenly (2022), a film promoting COVID-19 vaccine misinformation and Great Reset conspiracy theories
