= Nevada State Route 168 =

State highway in Nevada, United States

State Route 168
- Glendale–Moapa Road
- Nevada State Route 168, highlighted in red

Route information
- Maintained by NDOT
- Length: 24.775 mi (39.871 km)
- Existed: July 1, 1976–present
- History: SR 7 by 1919

Major junctions
- West end: US 93 in Coyote Springs
- East end: I-15 in Glendale

Location
- Country: United States
- State: Nevada
- County: Clark

Highway system
- Nevada State Highway System; Interstate; US; State; Pre‑1976; Scenic
← SR 165	→ SR 169

State Route 168 (SR 168) is a state highway in Clark County, Nevada, United States. Known as the Glendale–Moapa Road, the highway connects U.S. Route 93 (US 93) to Interstate 15 (I-15) at Glendale about 25 miles (40 km) southeast. The route was designated as the southern end of State Route 7 in 1919, and served as part of US 93 from 1931 to 1967.

== Route description ==
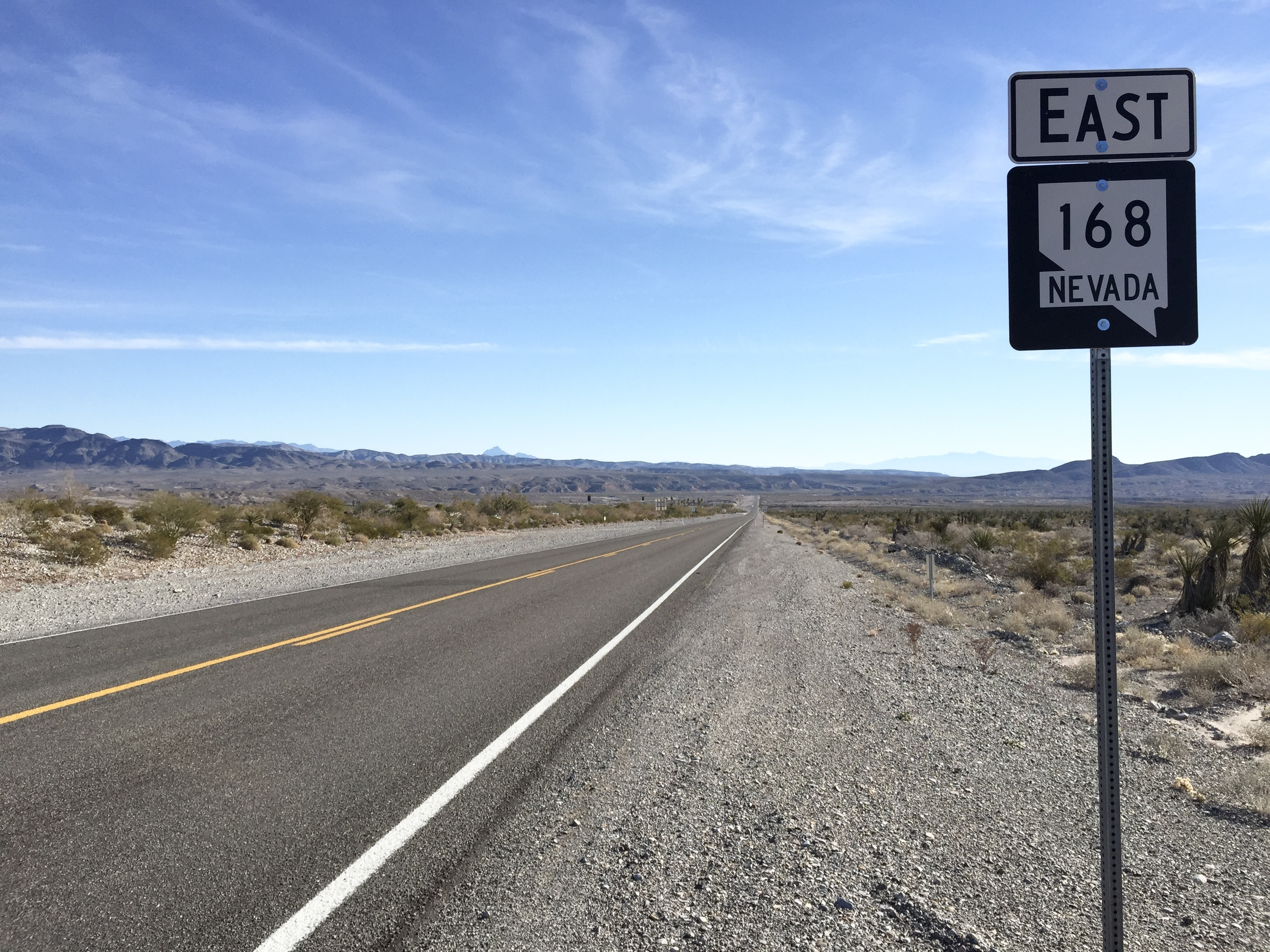
View from the west end of SR 168 looking eastbound as seen in 2015

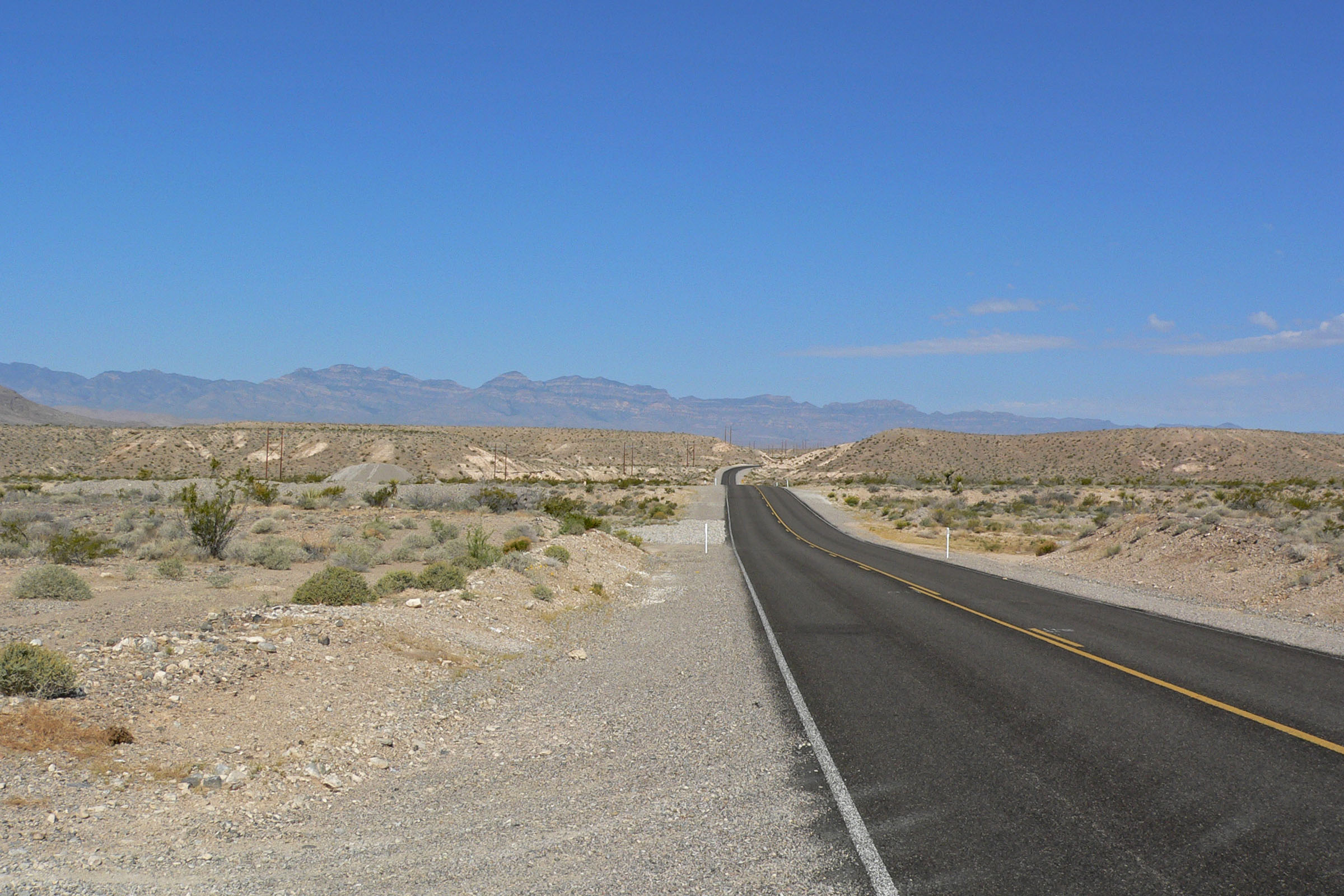
Looking west towards the Sheep Range from near Dead Man Wash as seen in 2006

The western terminus of SR 168 is in northern Clark County, at the proposed planned community of Coyote Springs. The route begins at the junction with US 93 east of the Sheep Range on the eastern border of the Desert National Wildlife Refuge. The route continues eastward about 8.4 miles (13.5 km), passing north of the Arrow Canyon Wilderness Area. From there, the route enters the town limits of Moapa for the next 15 miles (24 km), passing adjacent to the Moapa River Indian Reservation . At this point the highway enters Glendale. Where it intersects the Interstate 15 Glendale interchange (exit 90), SR 168 turns north onto Lewis Ranch Road through Glendale to end at exit 91, also on I-15.

== History ==
State Route 168 has existed as part of Nevada's state highway system since 1919. In that year, the Nevada Legislature amended the general highway law to add State Route 7, which was vaguely defined as "commencing at the city of Ely and running thence southerly through Pioche to Las Vegas." The southern terminus of SR 7 was later truncated to Glendale, with its southernmost miles following the alignment of present-day SR 168.

SR 168 was previously part of State Route 7 and U.S. Route 93

At a meeting held on June 8, 1931, the American Association of State Highway Officials (AASHO) approved an extension of U.S. Route 93 through Nevada. This extension brought the southern end of that route from Wells to Glendale. South of Ely, the extension of US 93 was routed over State Route 7, including the portion northwest of Glendale. AASHO ordered another southerly extension of US 93 to Arizona via Las Vegas in 1935, which was signed by 1939. The routing of US 93 via the Glendale–Moapa segment remained in place until 1967. In that year, a shorter route connecting Las Vegas and Caliente was completed, bypassing Glendale. The 24 miles (39 km) of highway northwest of Glendale remained in the state highway system, still marked as State Route 7.

After the removal of US 93 from the route, the southerly segment of SR 7 remained unchanged for several years. On July 1, 1976, the Nevada Department of Transportation initiated the renumbering of Nevada's state highways. In this process, the highway was renumbered to State Route 168. This change was first seen on the 1978 edition of the state's highway map.

== Major intersections ==
The entire route is in Clark County.

Location	mi	km	Destinations	Notes
Coyote Springs	0.000	0.000	US 93 – Las Vegas, Caliente	Western terminus
Glendale	24.775	39.871	I-15 – Las Vegas, Salt Lake City	Interchange; eastern terminus; I-15 exit 90
1.000 mi = 1.609 km; 1.000 km = 0.621 mi
