= Helder =

Helder may refer to:

- Den Helder or The Helder, a municipality and a city in the Netherlands
- Anglo-Russian invasion of Holland in 1799, or expedition to the "Helder"

== People ==
- Anne-Marie Helder (21st century), British singer-songwriter
- Glenn Helder (born 1968), Dutch footballer
- Lilian Helder (born 1973), Dutch politician
- Liza Helder (born 1989), Aruban model and Miss Aruba 2012
- Luke Helder (born 1981), American bomber
- John Helder Wedge (1793–1872), Tasmanian politician

== Arts ==
- "Helder" (comics), a short comics story by Chester Brown

== See also ==
- Hélder, a Portuguese masculine given name
