= John Held =

John Held may refer to:

- John Held (cyclist), American cyclist, bronze medal winner at the 1949 UCI Track Cycling World Championships
- John Held Jr. (1889–1958), American cartoonist and illustrator
- John Held Jr. (mailartist) (born 1947), American visual and performance artist and author
