= Hold-up (2020 film) =

- Directed by: Pierre Barnérias
- Starring: Michael Levitt; Luc Montagnier; Christian Perronne; Laurent Toubiana; Martine Wonner
- Release date: 11 November 2020
- Running time: 163 minutes
- Country: France
- Language: French

Hold-up is a 2020 independent pseudoscience propaganda film directed by French conspiracy theorist Pierre Barnérias. The film makes a number of false claims about the COVID-19 pandemic. Hold-Up was first released as a VoD on Vimeo 11 November 2020. Vimeo deleted the film the next day, citing the numerous lies in the film; DailyMotion likewise removed the film the next day. The film continues to be spread on social media among QAnon supporters.

== Plot ==
Hold-Up claims that a global conspiracy plot had been formed by the world's elites, and particularly the World Economic Forum. According to the film, the SARS-CoV-2 virus was deliberately created for an excuse to enslave humanity. A full version of the documentary that remains online has been watched more than 2,000,000 times, while a trailer for Hold Up also remains visible on Facebook, Twitter, and YouTube. All central claims of the film have been proven to be wrong, and the producers of the film have been shown to falsify their sources and misrepresent statements.

== See also ==
- Plandemic
