= Hélder Neto =

Angolan footballer

Personal information
- Full name: Hélder Graça Costa Neto
- Date of birth: September 5, 1982 (age 44)
- Place of birth: Angola
- Height: 1.77 m (5 ft 10 in)
- Position: Forward

Senior career*
| Years | Team | Apps | (Gls) |
| 2001–2004 | Juventude Castanheira | ? | (?) |
| 2004 | Vilafranquense | ? | (?) |
| 2004–2005 | Lixa | 24 | (8) |
| 2005–2006 | Aves | 17 | (3) |
| 2006–2007 | Trofense | 0 | (0) |
| 2007 | → Maria Fonte (loan) | 13 | (3) |
| 2007 | → Famalicão (loan) | ? | (?) |
| 2008 | Doxa | 8 | (1) |
| 2008–2010 | Vila Meã | 58 | (21) |
- * Club domestic league appearances and goals as of 20 June 2011

Hélder da Graça Costa Neto (born 5 September 1982) is an Angolan footballer who plays as a forward. He is currently playing for Doxa Katokopias FC in the Cyprus Football League.
