= AIM ImmunoTech =

US biopharmaceutical company

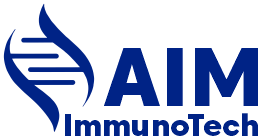
- AIM ImmunoTech company logo.
- Trade name: AIM
- Traded as: AMEX: AIM
- Industry: Biopharmaceutical
- Headquarters: Ocala, Florida, USA
- Key people: CEO Thomas K. Equels, J.D. COO Peter W. Rodino III, J.D. CFO Ellen Lintal
- Products: Ampligen; Alferon
- Services: Cancer and immunotherapy research
- Total assets: $ 64.584 million ▲ (2020)

AIM ImmunoTech Inc., formerly known as Hemispherx Biopharma Inc., is a biopharmaceutical company based in Ocala, Florida that is focused on the research and development of therapeutics to treat multiple types of cancers, various viruses and immune-deficiency disorders. Founded in 1990, the company has twenty-three employees.

The company has created an immunomodulatory double stranded RNA drug called Ampligen.

It is also developing Ampligen to use as a treatment for multiple cancer tumor types, COVID-19 and chronic fatigue syndrome.

== History ==
The company's logo when it was named Hemispherx Biopharma, Inc.

On April 3, 2001, Hemispherx Biopharma, Inc. adjusted and restated its 1999 financial statements to reflect charges relating to an extension of the exercise period to certain warrants as of February 1999.

On April 3, 2006, Hemispherx Biopharma, Inc. restated financial results for 2003 and 2004 due to accounting mistakes related to debentures and warrants issued between March 2003 and August 2005.

In June, 2018, Hemispherx announced that Ampligen had shown effectiveness in activating the TLR3 without triggering T-cell regulatory activities, offering a potentially effective way to treat tumors.

As of June 2019, Hemispherx is operating five studies examining the viability of Ampligen for combating Ovarian cancer, to which end it has also raised tens of millions of dollars in shareholder capital.

On September 3, 2019, Hemispherx Biopharma was renamed to AIM ImmunoTech.

On March 12, 2020, Hemispherx Biopharma announced that they were testing a possible treatment for the novel coronavirus, the virus believed to cause the symptoms of COVID-19.
