= Journal of Clinical Virology =

- Discipline: Virology
- Language: English

Publication details
- Publisher: Elsevier
- Impact factor: 14.481 (2021)

Standard abbreviations
- ISO 4: J. Clin. Virol.

Links
- Journal homepage; Online archive

Journal of Clinical Virology is a scientific journal that covers the aspects of human virology that directly pertains to virus-induced clinical conditions. The journal is published by Elsevier.

== Abstracting and indexing ==
The journal is abstracted and indexed in:

- Current Contents - Clinical Medicine
- Sociedad Iberoamericana de Informacion Cientifica (SIIC) Data Bases
- PubMed/Medline
- Embase
- Elsevier BIOBASE
- Scopus

According to the Journal Citation Reports, the journal has a 2021 impact factor of 14.481.
