= Held up =

Held up may refer to:

- Robbery
- Held Up, a 1999 film starring Jamie Foxx
- Held Up (soundtrack), a soundtrack album from the film
- Held up (cards), to keep back a high card instead of playing it

== See also ==
- Hold up (disambiguation)
