= Hélder Muianga =

Mozambican footballer

Personal information
- Full name: Hélder Carlos Muianga
- Date of birth: 28 September 1976 (age 50)
- Place of birth: Maputo, Mozambique
- Position: Defender

Senior career*
Years	Team	Apps	(Gls)
1994–1999	Costa do Sol	134	(7)
1999–2002	Manning Rangers	66	(6)
2002–2003	Black Leopards	16	(6)
2003	Desportivo de Maputo	0	(0)
2003–2004	Dynamos FC	22	(0)
2004	Manning Rangers	0	(0)
2004–2005	Budapest Honvéd	3	(0)
2005–2008	Jomo Cosmos	7	(0)

International career
1997–2004	Mozambique	30	(0)
- * Club domestic league appearances and goals

Hélder Carlos Muianga (born 28 September 1976), commonly known as Mano-Mano, is a Mozambican retired footballer who played in Mozambique for Costa do Sol and Desportivo de Maputo, in South Africa for Manning Rangers, Black Leopards, Dynamos FC and Jomo Cosmos, and in Hungary for Budapest Honvéd. Muianga also won 30 caps for the Mozambican national side between 1997 and 2004.

After retiring as a player in 2008, Muianga joined the Jomo Cosmos coaching technical team. The Federação Moçambicana de Futebol (FMF) terminated its contract with Dutch selector coach Mart Nooij in September 2011 after the national team failed to qualify for the African Cup, but Hélder Muianga e João Chissano were retained.
