= Work Personality Index =

The Work Personality Index is a psychometric assessment that measures personality traits. It was designed by Dr. Donald Macnab and Shawn Bakker of Psychometrics Canada. The questionnaire is designed to identify personality traits that relate to work performance; it takes most people 10 minutes to complete. It was created for the applications of selecting job candidates, guiding career choices and improving team functionality. The Work Personality Index assesses 21 primary scales that measure aspects of work personality to make links between an individual’s preferences and their work behavior. These 21 scales are categorized into 5 groups that provide a view of work personality.

The Work Personality Index measures personality traits immediately applicable to work settings. The test items revolve around typical work experiences, and for people to respond to them correctly they need to be able to relate to the situations presented in each item. For this reason, the Work Personality Index is appropriate for people in the working population. Younger adults may not have enough work experience to respond to the items in a valid way. Therefore, it is recommended that the Work Personality Index be used with people who are older than seventeen years of age.

The Work Personality Index measures personality traits for the normal adult population and does not examine clinical or mental health related issues. As a result, low scores on the scales are not indicative of pathology, but rather, different preferences and motivations for working. These different preferences and motivations influence the type of work people are successful at and what they enjoy doing.

== Conceptualization ==
The Work Personality Index model is built upon the personality traits identified in the Occupational Information Network (O*NET) developed by the U.S. Department of Labor. This model is not based upon a theoretical view of human personality, but is a combination and ordering of personality traits that predict job performance. The model was formulated by examining two main sources. First, many research studies have been conducted that link different personality traits to effective job performance. Commonly known as predictive or concurrent validity studies, this research provides important evidence of the traits that can be measured effectively and that predict job performance. Examining these studies lead to the identification of a number of personality traits that consistently relate to effectiveness on the job. Second, existing taxonomies that are used in personal development and personnel selection were reviewed. To examine these taxonomies, the personality measures that operationalize them were analyzed, and their research critiqued. These personality measures included: the California Psychological Inventory, by Harrison Gough, the Hogan Personality Inventory, by R. Hogan and J. Hogan, and the NEO PI-R, by Paul Costa and Robert McCrae. Reviewing these personality assessments led to the identification of other personality traits that are closely tied to work preferences and motivations.

By examining these two main sources, 21 primary scales were identified, which the O*NET researchers grouped into seven global scales. However, factor analysis of the trial Work Personality Index data indicated that a 5 factor solution provided a better fit. Therefore, the Work Personality Index contains 21 primary scales that are categorized into 5 global constructs. The 5 groups are labeled Achievement Orientation, Conscientiousness, Social Orientation, Practical Intelligence and Adjustment. These groups closely mirror the global traits identified in the Five-Factor Model of Personality Big Five personality traits. The 21 primary scales represent a finer grained assessment of the 5 constructs. For example, Achievement Orientation contains the following primary scales: Ambition, Initiative, Flexibility, Energy, and Leadership.

== Constructs and traits ==
- Achievement Orientation - Achievement Orientation involves working hard and wanting to get ahead, persisting in the face of obstacles, and striving for career success.
  Primary scales: Ambition, Initiative, Flexibility, Energy and Leadership.
- Conscientiousness - Conscientiousness involves being planful, careful, dependable and disciplined.
  Primary scales: Persistence, Attention to Detail, Rule-Following and Dependability.
- Social Orientation - Social Orientation is represented by sensitivity to the needs of others, a willingness to work cooperatively rather than independently, and a preference for working with others and establishing personal relationships.
  Primary scales: Teamwork, Concern for Others, Outgoing and Democratic.
- Practical Intelligence - Practical Intelligence involves characteristics such as insight, imagination, originality, being open to new ideas and maintaining a thoughtful approach to work.
  Primary scales; Innovation and Analytical Thinking.
- Adjustment - The Adjustment composite found in the Work Personality Index closely resembles the Neuroticism composite found in the Five-Factor Model. Representing the tendency to remain calm, composed and free from worry in stressful situations, other common labels for this construct include Emotional Stability, Negative Emotionality and Worrying.
  Primary scales: Self-Control and Stress Tolerance.

== Norming ==
The Work Personality Index was standardized on a large sample of over 8000 people. From this group a matched sample of 3000 males and 3000 females were selected to create North American norms. The large number of participants involved in the norm sample ensures that the Work Personality Index results effectively measure and identify differences in personality traits.

== See also ==
- Myers–Briggs Type Indicator
