= Held for Ransom =

Held for Ransom may refer to:

- Held for Ransom (2020 film), a film awarded with the Political Film Society Award for Human Rights 2020
- Held for Ransom (2000 film), an American film directed by Lee Stanley
- Held for Ransom (1938 film), an American film directed by Clarence Bricker
- Held for Ransom (1913 film), an American film directed by Oscar Apfel
- Adventures of Sherlock Holmes; or, Held for Ransom, a 1905 American film directed by J. Stuart Blackton
