= Jay A. Levy =

Jay A. Levy (born November 21, 1938) is an American AIDS and cancer research physician. He is a professor of medicine with specialties in virology and immunology at the University of California, San Francisco (UCSF).

== Biography ==
Levy was born in Wilmington, Delaware, with his twin brother, Stuart B. Levy. Levy received his B.A. degree with high honors from Wesleyan University (Connecticut) in 1960 and subsequently his M.D. from the College of Physicians and Surgeons at Columbia University in 1965. He conducted research for a year on regeneration in planaria at the Université de Paris (Paris, France) on Fulbright and French government fellowships. From 1961 to 1963, he was a Fellow in the School of International and Public Affairs, Columbia University, New York. He completed his internship and residency at the University of Pennsylvania Medical Center (Philadelphia) from 1965 to 1967.

Levy was a staff associate at the National Cancer Institute (Bethesda MD) at the National Institutes of Health (NIH) from 1967 to 1970 and completed his residency training at UCSF in 1971. He was then appointed assistant professor at the UCSF Department of Medicine and has been a full professor since 1985.

== Research activities ==
During his time in Philadelphia, Levy conducted research on Epstein-Barr virus (EBV) with Gertrude and Werner Henle at Children's Hospital and on B lymphocyte biology at the Wistar Institute with Dr. Vittorio Defendi. While studying tumor viruses, particularly retroviruses, at NIH, he discovered xenotropic viruses Xenotropic viruses replicate or reproduce in cells other than those of the host species. These studies provided support for the germline transmission of endogenous retroviruses and the use of retroviruses in human gene therapy. The search for xenotropic viruses in human cells led to characterization of retrovirus-like particles in placentas. His work at the NIH on the FBJ (Finkel-Biskis-Jinkins) osteosarcoma virus provided the background for the subsequent discovery of the fos/jun oncogene.

== AIDS research ==
Levy began his studies on AIDS in 1981 and independently discovered the AIDS virus, HIV, in 1983 which he originally called the AIDS-associated retrovirus (ARV) HIV. Among his other discoveries is the presence of HIV in the brain and bowel and the demonstration of a noncytotoxic mechanism for controlling viral replication by CD8+ lymphocytes. This unexpected antiviral response that does not involve cell killing has subsequently been found in other viral infections including those of hepatitis and herpes viruses. His demonstration that heat treatment can eliminate HIV in clotting factor preparations prevented HIV infection in many hemophiliacs. More recently he has investigated the nature of the CD8+ cell antiviral factor (CAF) mediating the noncytotoxic response of CD8+ cells, the use of immune-based therapies, the development of an effective AIDS vaccine and a cure for HIV infection by stem cell approaches.

== Publications ==
Levy has published over 600 scientific articles and reviews and is the author or editor of 14 books dealing with virology and immunology. Among these are his text book on Virology (Prentice Hall), four volume series, The Retroviridae (Plenum Press) and his, sole-authored book, HIV and the Pathogenesis of AIDS, (ASM Press) now in its third edition (2007) and translated into Chinese, Russian, Italian, Portuguese, Spanish and Thai.

== Honors ==
• Editor-in-Chief, AIDS • Member, World Affairs Council • Member, Council on Foreign Relations • President, the American Committee of the Weizmann Institute of Science • AIDS adviser to several countries including India, China, France, Italy, Mexico, Ethiopia, the Dominican Republic, and Thailand

Fellow, American Academy of Arts and Sciences • Fellow, American Association for the Advancement of Science • Fellow, American Academy of Microbiology • Award of Distinction from the American Foundation for AIDS Research (AmFAR). • Honorary Doctorate in Science, Wesleyan University • Murray Thelin Award, the National Hemophilia Foundation • Outstanding Research in Immunology Award. American Society for Microbiology (ASM) Abbott Laboratories
