= Rintatolimod =

Medication

Clinical data
- Trade names: Ampligen
- Other names: PolyI:PolyC12U
- Routes of administration: IV
- ATC code: none

Identifiers
- IUPAC name: 5'-Inosinic acid, homopolymer, complex with 5'-cytidylic acid polymer with 5'-uridylic acid (1:1)
- CAS Number: 38640-92-5
- UNII: 94325AJ25N
- KEGG: D09661
- NIAID ChemDB: 000136
- CompTox Dashboard (EPA): DTXSID50191952

Chemical and physical data
- 3D model (JSmol): Interactive image
- SMILES: O=P(O)(O)OC[C@H]3O[C@@H](n1c2N\C=N/C(=O)c2nc1)[C@H](O)[C@@H]3O.O=C1/N=C(/N)\C=C/N1[C@@H]2O[C@H](COP(=O)(O)O)[C@@H](O)[C@H]2O.O=C/1NC(=O)N(\C=C\1)[C@@H]2O[C@@H]([C@@H](O)[C@H]2O)COP(=O)(O)O
- InChI: InChI=1S/C10H13N4O8P.C9H14N3O8P.C9H13N2O9P/c15-6-4(1-21-23(18,19)20)22-10(7(6)16)14-3-13-5-8(14)11-2-12-9(5)17;10-5-1-2-12(9(15)11-5)8-7(14)6(13)4(20-8)3-19-21(16,17)18;12-5-1-2-11(9(15)10-5)8-7(14)6(13)4(20-8)3-19-21(16,17)18/h2-4,6-7,10,15-16H,1H2,(H,11,12,17)(H2,18,19,20);1-2,4,6-8,13-14H,3H2,(H2,10,11,15)(H2,16,17,18);1-2,4,6-8,13-14H,3H2,(H,10,12,15)(H2,16,17,18)/t4-,6-,7-,10-;2*4-,6-,7-,8-/m111/s1; Key:KNUXHTWUIVMBBY-JRJYXWDASA-N

Rintatolimod, sold under the tradename Ampligen, is a medication intended for treatment of myalgic encephalomyelitis/chronic fatigue syndrome (ME/CFS). There is some evidence it may improve some ME/CFS symptoms.

It is an immunomodulatory double-stranded RNA drug similar to the prototypical RNA poly I:C. It was first synthesized in the 1970s and is manufactured by AIM ImmunoTech (formerly known as Hemispherx Biopharma).

Although Ampligen was initially cleared for use in Canada in 1997, and obtained orphan drug status for treatment of ME/CFS in the European Union in 2000, it is approved for use only in Argentina. Its status in Canada, per later information, is as a Special Use Program. Rintatolimod has not yet been approved as a legally prescriptible medication to treat any formally defined health conditions, diseases, or symptoms in the United States of America; it is still classified by the U.S. Food and Drug Administration (FDA) as an experimental drug.

In 2007, Hemispherx filed a new drug application with the U.S. Food and Drug Administration (FDA) to market and sell rintatolimod for the treatment of CFS, but this was rejected in December 2009, because the FDA concluded that the two randomized controlled trials "did not provide credible evidence of efficacy" and "because of clinical, statistical, clinical pharmacology, nonclinical, product quality, and facilities inspection deficiencies." The FDA requested Hemispherx conduct at least one additional controlled trial to demonstrate efficacy in treating ME/CFS. In August 2012, Hemispherx submitted further analyses of the original clinical trial data, but did not submit additional trials for review. Four months later, a committee of the FDA voted 8–5 against approval for rintatolimod, again citing insufficient data. There are two open-label uses in the US, under Dr. Dan Peterson in Nevada and Dr. Charles Lapp in North Carolina.

Ampligen continues to be evaluated, and as of May 2021 is the subject of phase 2 and phase 3 trials to potentially treat myalgic encephalomyelitis/chronic fatigue syndrome (ME/CFS) and several cancers.

== Medical uses ==
As of 2021, there is limited scientific evidence supporting the therapeutic efficacy of rintatolimod in treating CFS. The number of double-blinded, placebo-controlled human trial studies published in well-regarded peer-reviewed journals is very sparse. However, there is a small amount of evidence from preliminary clinical studies of limited scope indicating that administration of rintatolimod may improve the daily quality of life of people diagnosed with CFS. Rintatolimod was designed with the therapeutic intention of preserving the healthy functioning of human cells by enhancing each cell's immunoresistance to actively-invasive viruses and uncontrollably-proliferating tumorous human cells, e.g. cancerous growths. Therefore, if rintatolimod is proven effective in its originally intended role as a compound to enhance human cells' resistance to viruses and tumors, it is hypothesized by some medical professionals that it could act synergistically with other antiviral drugs in preventing human infections from avian influenza if coadministered with them.

== Side effects ==
An independent review of rintatolimod trials in CFS was published in the December 2006 issue of the Journal of Clinical Virology. It concluded that Ampligen has been "generally well tolerated", with a "low incidence of clinical toxicity", particularly when compared with the toxicity of the diseases it is used to treat. "No serious safety issues have resulted from the administration of about 75,000 doses IV (most commonly 400 mg) twice weekly for up to one year periods or greater. Animal toxicity studies support this observation in humans, with primates demonstrating the greatest margin of safety." A mild flushing reaction has occurred in about 15% of patients, and more rarely reported side effects include chills, fever, malaise, leukopenia, neutropenia, and leukocytosis. Some of these side effects may be attributed to a temporary Herxheimer reaction in response to pathogen die-off. According to Hemispherx and patient testimonials, side effects, when they occur, usually subside within 3–4 months or less.

== Mechanism of action ==
One mode of action of this drug is to stimulate the innate immune system, also called the nonspecific immune system, and the first line of defense. According to a study published in the Journal of Immunology and reflected in a press release by Hemispherx, rintatolimod stimulates the innate immune system by binding to toll-like receptors 3 (TLR-3), and activating the TLR-3 receptors for broad-spectrum immune response. TLR-3 receptors are located intracellular at the membranes of endosomes. They are part of a family of "pattern recognition" receptors that detect pathogens immediately, long before the slower adaptive immunity can intervene against foreign invaders. These receptors are critical to the first line of immunological defense against a broad range of pathogens, including viruses and cancer.

The mechanism of rintatolimod in relation to CFS is not certain, but is thought to include the RNase L enzyme. Rintatolimod is a dsRNA, and when TLR-3 senses a dsRNA, it is thought to relay a message to cells to produce interferons (IFNs). IFNs are a group of signaling molecules released by cells in response to the presence of pathogenic viruses or bacteria. These signaling molecules activate (among other things) the protective defenses of the immune system that eradicate pathogens. One such defense mechanism thought to be activated by rintatolimod is the production of the enzyme RNase L. This enzyme degrades RNA, both viral and cellular. Degradation of RNA prevents viral and cell replication, and destruction of all RNA within a virus or cell is the last step before apoptosis or death. Accumulation of an inactive form of RNase L may be associated with CFS.

== History ==
Rintatolimod development evolved from a 1960s synthesis by Merck & Co., a double-stranded RNA compound of inosinic and cytidylic acid residues (poly I:poly C or poly I:C). Poly I:C inhibited tumor growth by inducing IFN production, but was too toxic to use. In the mid-1970s, William A. Carter, a postdoctoral researcher at Johns Hopkins University, modified the dsRNA molecule by adding uridylic acid molecules at specific intervals along the RNA chain. The new compound, called Ampligen (for AMPLIfied GENetic activity) stimulated interferon production like poly I:C, but with much lower toxicity. It is also known as "poly I:poly C12U".

Dr. Carter founded a company based upon the compound, and licensed it from Johns Hopkins. By the late 1980s, Carter and his company, HEM Research, Inc., were pursuing human therapeutic uses for rintatolimod, as well as nontherapeutic uses, such as diagnostic testing for HIV and protecting plants from pathogens.

Rintatolimod was tested in clinical trials in the United States beginning in 1988, after DuPont invested $30 million in Hemispherx. Initial success in a small trial for AIDS treatment was followed by difficulties in persuading the FDA to permit large-scale trials. By 1991, the chance of approval for a large trial being conducted in the USA was thought to be gone. Hemispherx then began to move clinical trials to Canada and Belgium.

In Belgium, rintatolimod has been available for use since the drug's trial beginning in May 1996. It has also been available under Canada's Special Access Program for both CFS and HIV treatment since 1996, with marketing rights controlled by Biovail Corporation International. An agreement between the Spanish company Esteve and Hemispherx in 2002 gave Esteve the rights to perform clinical trials at their own cost in Spain, Portugal, and Andorra. Bioclones (PTY) Ltd, a UK based company, was granted the exclusive marketing rights to rintatolimod in the United Kingdom, Ireland, and several countries in the Southern Hemisphere. The marketing agreement with Bioclones was terminated in 2005. Over its developmental history, rintatolimod has received various designations, including "orphan drug product" and "emergency compassionate cost recovery sales authorization", both from the FDA, and "promising" clinical outcome recognition based on the evaluation of certain summary clinical reports (AHRQ, Agency Health Research Quality).

According to the US National Academy of Sciences Institute of Medicine, "Chronic fatigue syndrome is a disease characterized by profound fatigue, cognitive dysfunction, sleep abnormalities, autonomic manifestations, pain, and other symptoms that are made worse by exertion of any sort. CFS can severely impair patients' ability to conduct their normal lives." In October 2007, Hemispherx BioPharma submitted their first new drug application (NDA) to the FDA for rintatolimod to treat CFS. In December 2007, the agency deemed the application incomplete, citing deficiencies including lack of dose ranging, statistical analysis plans inconsistent with protocols, database discrepancies, and lack of clinical pharmacology and carcinogenicity data. In early 2009, Hemispherx again submitted rintatolimod for FDA approval for CFS treatment. The FDA scheduled their decision for May 25th of that year and twice postponed. The company received a Complete Response Letter from the agency on rintatolimod's NDA in December 2009, requesting further data.

In 2007, and again during the 2009 swine flu pandemic, Carter said that rintatolimod could also be used as an H1N1 flu vaccine booster, citing in vitro studies with Ampligen and neuraminidase inhibitors oseltamivir and zanamivir (brand names Tamiflu and Relenza).

Hemispherx Biopharma continues to work with the FDA on rintatolimod approval for CFS treatment. On December 20, 2012, an FDA Advisory Committee voted in favor of rintatolimod's safety for commercial use (vote 8 to 5), but not in favor of its efficacy (4 to 9). The Complete Response Letter asked for more study data prior to rintatolimod approval. On January 12, 2015, the company released new in vitro study findings showing that low natural killer cell function associates with greater CFS disease symptom severity, and that rintatolimod treatment increases average NK cell activity over 100%. The new study report, "Low Natural Killer (NK) Activity Observed Across the Chronic Fatigue Syndrome (CFS) Disease Spectrum," has been submitted as a scientific paper for peer review and publication. In addition to the new study findings, the paper summarizes six supportive publications of results with more than 150 CFS patients, correlating increased debility of CFS and low NK cell activity. Clinical testing is currently under way to determine whether NK cell activity augmentation by rintatolimod in vivo associates with lessened CFS disease severity and increased physical endurance and performance measures.

== Status around the world as of 2022 ==
Although Ampligen was initially cleared for use in Canada in 1997, and obtained orphan drug status for treatment of CFS in the European Union in 2000, it is approved for use only in Argentina. Its status in Canada, is as a Special Access Program, via the My Tomorrows program set up in Amsterdam. It is so far without FDA approval, and is classed as experimental in the United States.

It was approved for use in Argentina and will soon be ready for commercial sales. Interest rose in that country after an increase in the number of ME/CFS cases following its SARS epidemic in 2002–2003. Argentina anticipates a similar rise in ME/CFS cases from SARS-CoV-2.

In 2007, Hemispherx filed a new drug application with the U.S. Food and Drug Administration (FDA) to market and sell rintatolimod for the treatment of CFS, but this was rejected in December 2009, because the FDA concluded that the two randomized controlled trials "did not provide credible evidence of efficacy" and "because of clinical, statistical, clinical pharmacology, nonclinical, product quality, and facilities inspection deficiencies." The FDA requested Hemispherx conduct at least one additional controlled trial to demonstrate efficacy in treating CFS.

In August 2012, Hemispherx submitted further analyses of the original clinical trial data to FDA, but did not submit additional trials for review. Four months later, a committee of the FDA voted 8–5 against approval for rintatolimod, again citing insufficient data.

Work continues on the drug, and there has been no approval by the US FDA, as of May 2021. There is open-label use in the US, under Dr. Dan Peterson in Nevada.

As of 2022, rintatolimod was approved in Argentina and is ready to "Launch pending FDA export authorization"

== Controversy ==
In 1998 and 2000, Hemispherx received notices of violation from the FDA for promoting rintatolimod as safe and effective before FDA approval, in violation of the Federal Food, Drug, and Cosmetic Act.

Also in the late 1990s, Manuel Asensio reported on Hemispherx, saying the company was overvalued. He criticized Hemispherx and its rintatolimod results, alleging a variety of misdemeanors, including accusations of refusing to supply rintatolimod after clinical trials have ended, and issuing misleading results to widen markets for rintatolimod.

In 1998, Hemispherx Biopharma filed a complaint against Asensio and his company, alleging defamation, conspiracy, and interference with its business relations through a short-selling plot. After a jury rejected the defamation claims against Asensio, a mistrial was declared.

On November 2, 1999, Mary Schweitzer, a CFS patient who had been treated with rintatolimod, raised the question of why Ampligen has never been fast-tracked by the US public health authorities at the Chronic Fatigue Syndrome Co-ordinating Committee of the U.S. Department of Health and Human Services. Grassroots activism for FDA approval of Ampligen grew and continues. Efforts in 2015 to spur FDA approval of Ampligen include petitions, appeal for congressional hearing, and popular social media group organizing.

Adam Feuerstein, a journalist for The Street, has published several articles harshly critical of Hemispherx BioPharma, Inc. In June 2009, Feuerstein alleged the company was "seeking to divert investors' attention away from the delayed approval of Ampligen as a treatment for chronic fatigue syndrome" by issuing three press releases in seven days about research from 2007 into possible applications for Ampligen as a flu vaccine booster, in which Hemispherx stated that Ampligen could be used against the H1N1 swine flu. This article also alleged the press releases were misleading, because they implied the research had been done in 2009. When Hemispherx offered Ampligen as a potential H1N1 vaccine or vaccine booster, the U.S. government turned them down, and Feuerstein wrote, "Hemispherx Biopharma has been shut out of the U.S. government's efforts to stockpile vaccine against the H1N1 flu."

== Research ==
Rintatolimod has been studied in humans since 1994. In early 2015, the AMP 511 open-label study of rintatolimod in CFS was still recruiting participants. Open-label studies are typically used when the controlled trial has ended and treatment is continued so that the subjects and the controls may continue to receive the investigational drug until marketing approval is obtained. Hemispherx management had missed several target deadlines for NDA filing in the past, including the end of 2005, the third quarter of 2006, and the first quarter of 2007. In October 2007, the US FDA Ampligen NDA was filed. In December 2009, the FDA issued a complete response letter refusing Hemispherx's new drug application for rintatolimod's treatment of CFS. The FDA concluded that the two RCTs "did not provide credible evidence of efficacy." The agency recommended a minimum of one additional six-month, 300-patient study, and rodent carcinogenicity studies.

Rintatolimod is administered intravenously. It is generally administered twice weekly for periods of one year or longer. Two toxicology studies had been completed as of 2007, which established the safety of intranasal and intramucosal methods of Ampligen administration as a vaccine immunostimulant. Hemispherx has conducted research on a by mouth versions of rintatolimod using nucleic acid technology related to rintatolimod.
