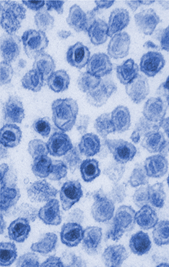

Virus classification
- (unranked): Virus
- Realm: Riboviria
- Kingdom: Pararnavirae
- Phylum: Artverviricota
- Class: Revtraviricetes
- Order: Ortervirales
- Family: Retroviridae
- Genus: Gammaretrovirus
- Virus: Xenotropic murine leukemia virus-related virus

= Xenotropic murine leukemia virus–related virus =

Xenotropic murine leukemia virus-related virus

Species of virus

Xenotropic murine leukemia virus–related virus (XMRV) is a retrovirus which was first described in 2006 as an apparently novel human pathogen found in tissue samples from people with prostate cancer. Initial reports erroneously linked the virus to prostate cancer and later to chronic fatigue syndrome (CFS), leading to considerable interest in the scientific and patient communities, investigation of XMRV as a potential cause of multiple medical conditions, and public-health concerns about the safety of the donated blood supply.

Xenotropic viruses replicate or reproduce in cells other than those of the host species. Murine refers to the rodent family Muridae, which includes common household rats and mice.

Subsequent research established that XMRV was in fact a laboratory contaminant, rather than a novel pathogen, and had been generated unintentionally in the laboratory through genetic recombination between two mouse retroviruses during propagation of a prostate-cancer cell line in the mid-1990s. These findings raised serious questions concerning the findings of XMRV-related studies which purported to find connections between XMRV and human diseases. There is no evidence that XMRV infects humans, nor that XMRV is associated with or causes any human disease.

== Classification and genome ==
XMRV is a murine leukemia virus (MLV) that formed through the recombination of the genomes of two parent MLVs known as preXMRV-1 and preXMRV-2. MLVs belong to the virus family Retroviridae and the genus gammaretrovirus and have a single-stranded RNA genome that replicates through a DNA intermediate. The name XMRV was given because the discoverers of the virus initially thought that it was a novel potential human pathogen that was related to but distinct from MLVs. The XMRV particle is approximately spherical and 80 to 100 nm in diameter. Several XMRV genomic sequences have been published to date. These sequences are almost identical, an unusual finding as retroviruses replicate their genomes with relatively low fidelity, leading to divergent viral sequences in a single host organism. In 2010 the results of phylogenetic analyses of XMRV and related murine retroviruses led a group of researchers to conclude that XMRV "might not be a genuine human pathogen". Xenotropic viruses (xenos Gr. foreign; tropos Gr. turning) were initially discovered in the New Zealand Black (NZB) mouse and later found to be present in many other mouse strains including wild mice.

== Discovery ==
XMRV was discovered in the laboratories of Joseph DeRisi at the University of California, San Francisco, and Robert Silverman and Eric Klein of the Cleveland Clinic. Silverman had previously cloned and investigated the enzyme ribonuclease L (RNase L), part of the cell's natural defense against viruses. When activated, RNase L degrades cellular and viral RNA to halt viral replication. In 2002, the "hereditary prostate cancer 1" locus (HPC1) was mapped to the RNase L gene, implicating it in the development of prostate cancer. The cancer-associated "R462Q" mutation results in a glutamine instead of an arginine at position 462 of the RNase L enzyme, reducing its catalytic activity. A man with two copies of this mutation has twice the risk of prostate cancer; one copy raises the risk by 50%. Klein and Silverman hypothesized that "the putative linkage of RNase L alterations to HPC might reflect enhanced susceptibility to a viral agent" and conducted a viral screen of prostate cancer samples, leading to the discovery of XMRV.

== Disease association studies ==
=== Prostate cancer ===
Detection of XMRV was reported in several articles. However, subsequent studies and retractions cast doubt on these findings.

=== Other conditions ===
In one study, XMRV was detected in a small percentage of patients with weakened immune systems, but other studies found no evidence of XMRV in immunosuppression.

== Controversy and origins ==
Concerns arose as multiple subsequent studies failed to replicate the positive findings of XMRV in the blood of patients with CFS, prostate cancer, and other illnesses.

Separate from these concerns, alarms were raised over the possibility that XMRV might be transmissible by blood transfusion since the virus was recovered from lymphocytes (white blood cells). XMRV is closely related to several known xenotropic mouse viruses which can recognize and enter cells of non-rodent species (including humans) by means of the cell surface xenotropic and polytropic retrovirus receptor 1 (XPR1). As a result, the AABB (formerly the American Association of Blood Banks) established a task force to determine the prevalence of XMRV in the United States' blood donation supply and the suitability of different detection methods.

In September 2011, the Scientific Research Working Group (SRWG) arm of the AABB task force released its findings that current assays could not reliably identify XMRV in human blood samples which had previously tested as XMRV/MLV positive; the only two labs which reported positive findings of XMRV in samples which were previously reported as positive (the WPI and NCI/Ruscetti labs) also reported positive findings in samples which were known XMRV negative.

Multiple contemporary studies concluded that XMRV was most likely a result of incidental recombination of mouse viruses during prostate cancer research in the 1990s. Positive findings of the virus were likely due to contamination rather than true presence of the virus in humans. A subsequent analysis also found that the primers used to detect and replicate traces of XMRV in PCR testing are, in fact, neither selective nor specific to XMRV and will actually react to various non-XMRV sequences naturally found in mammalian genomes. In the meantime, multiple other studies also failed to find any link between XMRV and CFS or prostate cancer. As a result, many of the key publications which did claim an association were voluntarily retracted. This included the initial study which had linked XMRV to CFS, which was retracted at Silverman's request; one of the co-authors, Judy Mikovits, was also accused of scientific misconduct.
