= Views of Robert F. Kennedy Jr. =

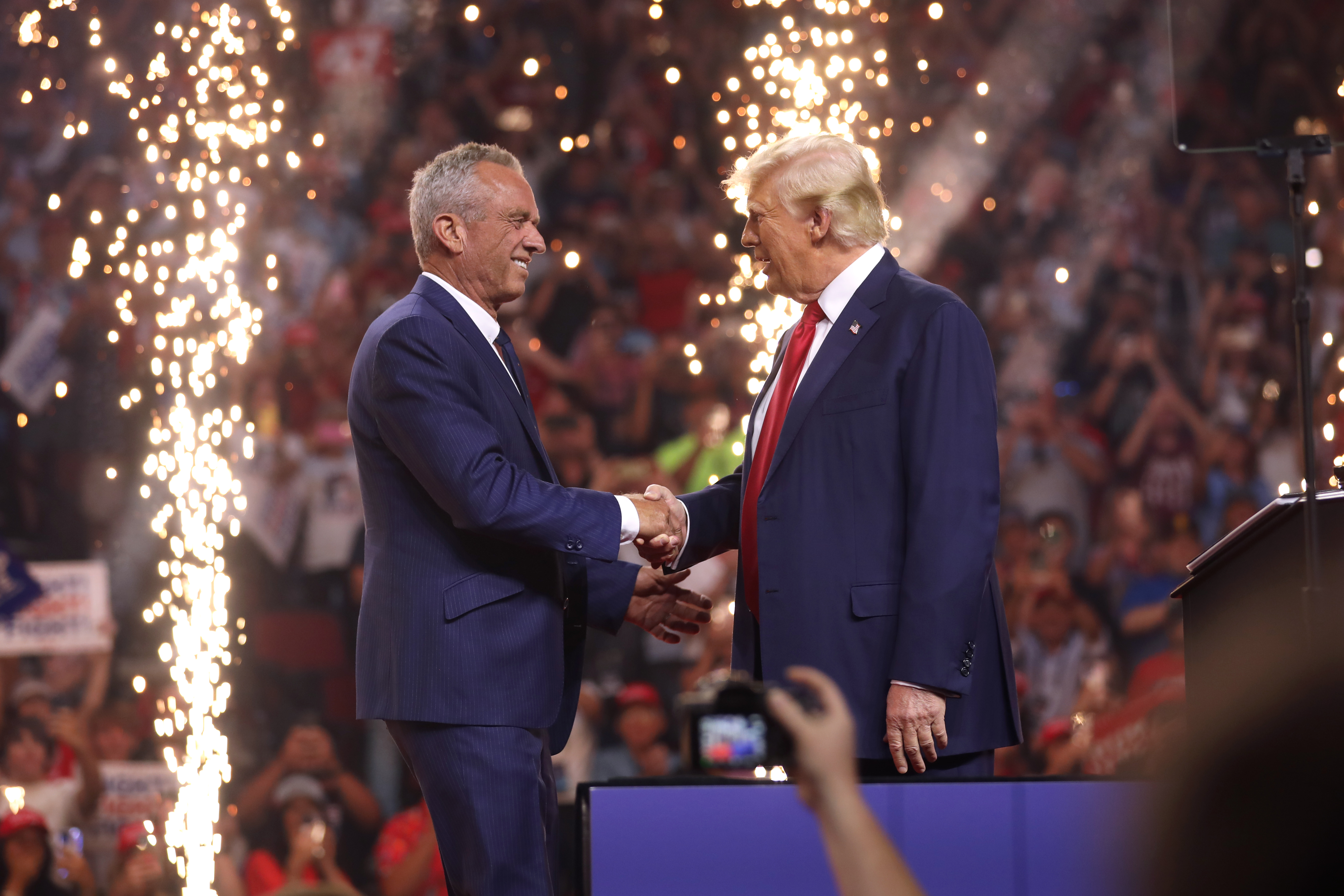
Kennedy endorsing Donald Trump at a rally in Arizona on August 23, 2024

Since 2005, Robert F. Kennedy Jr. has promoted vaccine misinformation and public-health conspiracy theories, including the chemtrail conspiracy theory, HIV/AIDS denialism, and the scientifically disproved claim of a causal link between vaccines and autism. He has drawn criticism for fueling vaccine hesitancy amid a social climate that gave rise to the deadly measles outbreaks in Samoa and Tonga. Kennedy is the founder and former chairman of Children's Health Defense, an anti-vaccine advocacy group and proponent of COVID-19 vaccine misinformation.

== Political views ==
Kennedy's political rhetoric often invokes conspiracy theories.

=== Economic inequality ===
Kennedy has argued that poor communities shoulder a disproportionate burden of environmental pollution. Speaking at the 2016 South by Southwest environment conference, he said, "Polluters always choose the soft target of poverty", noting that Chicago's South Side has the highest concentration of toxic waste dumps in the U.S., and added that 80% of "uncontrolled toxic waste dumps" are in black neighborhoods, with the largest site in Emelle, Alabama, which is 90% black.

Kennedy has said that "systematic" erosion of the middle class is taking place, remarking in a 2023 interview with UnHerd that American politicians have "been systematically hollowing out the American middle class and printing money to make billionaires richer". He said that the financial industry and the military–industrial complex are funded at the expense of the American middle class; that the U.S. government is dominated by corporate power; the Environmental Protection Agency is run by the "oil industry, the coal industry, and the pesticide industry"; and that the Food and Drug Administration is dominated by "Big Pharma". Kennedy sees a "vibrant middle class" as the economy's backbone and has said that the economy has deteriorated because the middle class has become poorer.

In an interview with Andrew Serwer, Kennedy said that the gap between rich and poor in the U.S. had become too great and that "the very wealthy people should pay more taxes and corporations". He also expressed support for Massachusetts senator Elizabeth Warren's wealth tax plan, which would impose an annual tax of 2% on every dollar of a household's net worth over $50 million and 6% on every dollar of net worth over $1 billion.

=== Foreign affairs and military intervention ===
Kennedy is critical of the United States' alliances with dictatorships like Saudi Arabia. He criticized the Saudi-led intervention in the Yemeni civil war, calling it a "genocide against the Iranian-backed Houthi tribe". Kennedy is a supporter of Israel. In December 2023, he had a heated exchange with Breaking Points host Krystal Ball, in what Rabbi Shmuley Boteach called "the single greatest defense of Israel on videos since the start of the" Gaza war. In a March 2025 HHS news release, he referred to student protests against Israel's actions in Gaza as "anti-semitism" and the product of "woke cancel culture".

An opponent of the military industry and foreign interventions, Kennedy was critical of the Iraq War as well as American support for Ukraine against Russia's invasion of the country. He condemned the Russian invasion of Ukraine, but called the Russo-Ukrainian War "a U.S. war against Russia" and said the war's goal was to "sacrifice the flower of Ukrainian youth in an abattoir of death and destruction for the geopolitical ambition of the neocons". He called for a peace agreement in Ukraine based on the Minsk Accords; in his view, the Donbas region should remain in Ukraine but also be given territorial autonomy and placed under the jurisdiction of United Nations peacekeeping forces, while Aegis missile systems should be removed from Eastern Europe.

Kennedy said Ukraine should be forbidden from joining NATO, and announced that as president he would consider admitting Russia to NATO and deescalating tensions with China. He said the 2014 Ukrainian revolution was an attempted coup sponsored by the U.S. against the Ukrainian government, and that the Ukrainian government committed atrocities against the Russian population in Donbas, wrongly claiming that all casualties of the Donbas War between 2014 and 2022 (about 14,000) were Russians. He said that Russians living there "were being systematically killed by the Ukrainian government".

Kennedy denounced the operations of former CIA director Allen Dulles, condemning U.S.-backed coups and interventions such as the 1953 Iranian coup d'état as "bloodthirsty", and blamed U.S. interventions in countries such as Syria and Iran for the rise of terrorist organizations such as ISIS and creating anti-American sentiment in the region. Kennedy said the CIA has no accountability and declared his intention to restructure the agency.

Kennedy's disapproval of U.S. intervention in foreign governments was expressed in a 1974 Atlantic Monthly article titled "Poor Chile", discussing the overthrow of Chilean president Salvador Allende. He also wrote editorials against the execution of Pakistani president Zulfikar Ali Bhutto by General Muhammad Zia-ul-Haq. In 1975, he published an article in The Wall Street Journal criticizing assassination as a foreign policy tool. In 2005, he wrote an article for the Los Angeles Times decrying President Bush's use of torture as anti-American. His uncle Senator Ted Kennedy entered the article into the Congressional Record.

In an article titled "Why the Arabs Don't Want Us in Syria" published in Politico in February 2016, Kennedy referred to the "bloody history that modern interventionists like George W. Bush, Ted Cruz, and Marco Rubio miss when they recite their narcissistic trope that Mideast nationalists 'hate us for our freedoms.' For the most part they don't; instead they hate us for the way we betrayed those freedoms—our own ideals—within their borders." Kennedy blames the Syrian war on a pipeline dispute. He cites apparent WikiLeaks disclosures alleging that the CIA led military and intelligence planners to foment a Sunni uprising against Syria's president, Bashar al-Assad, following his rejection of a proposed Qatar-Turkey pipeline through Syria in 2009, well before the Arab Spring.

In a June 2023 interview, Kennedy said that in broad terms, he believes that U.S. foreign relations should involve significantly reducing the military presence in other nations. He specifically said the country must "start unraveling the Empire" by closing U.S. bases in different locations worldwide.

Kennedy believes that the administration of President Joe Biden, in large part, caused the 2022 invasion of Ukraine by Russia due to reckless and militant action; he has specifically cited the issue of NATO expansion into Eastern Europe. At the same time, he has clarified that he refuses to connect this criticism with anything considered support of the government of Russia under Putin, particularly given Kennedy's ethical opposition to the regime's beliefs and politics. He has called Putin a "monster", a "thug", and a "gangster". He also criticized the Trump and Biden administrations' "provocative policies" in regard to U.S. relations with China, saying that "China does not want a hot war" and calling for a reduction in tensions.

=== Environmental policy ===
Kennedy promotes populist and anti-establishment environmental policies, claiming that "Bill Gates and the World Economic Forum and the billionaire boys' club in Davos" have hijacked the climate crisis. In a 2015 interview, Kennedy said of politicians skeptical of global warming that he "wished there were a law you could punish them under". He has said that environmentalists' priority should be to tackle the "carbon industry". He has called the current society and economy unsustainable and largely based on a "longtime deadly addiction to coal and oil" and contended that the economic system rewards pollution. In 2020, Kennedy said: "Right now, we have a market that is governed by rules that were written by the carbon incumbents to reward the dirtiest, filthiest, most poisonous, most toxic, most war-mongering fields from hell, rather than the cheap, clean, green, wholesome and patriotic fields from heaven."

Kennedy has advocated for a global transition from fossil fuels to renewable energy, but has opposed hydropower from dams. He has argued that switching to solar and wind energy reduces costs and greenhouse gases while improving air and water quality, citizens' health, and the number and quality of jobs. Kennedy's fight to stop Appalachian mountaintop removal mining was the subject of the film The Last Mountain.

In one of his first environmental cases, Kennedy sued Mobil Oil for polluting the Hudson. He had been an early supporter of natural gas as a viable bridge fuel to renewables and a cleaner alternative to coal, but said he turned against this controversial extraction method after investigating its cost to public health, climate, and road infrastructure. As a member of Governor Andrew Cuomo's fracking commission, Kennedy helped engineer a 2013 ban on fracking in New York State.

In 2013, Kennedy assisted the Chipewyan First Nation and the Beaver Lake Cree in fighting to protect their land from tar sands production. In February 2013, while protesting the Keystone XL Pipeline Kennedy, along with his son, Conor, was arrested for blocking a thoroughfare in front of the White House during a protest.

In August 2016, Kennedy and Waterkeepers participated in protests to block the extension of the Dakota Access pipeline across the Standing Rock Sioux Reservation's water supply.

Kennedy has maintained that the oil industry remains competitive against renewables and electric cars only due to massive direct and indirect subsidies and political interventions on the oil industry's behalf. In a June 2017 interview on EnviroNews, he said of the oil industry: "That's what their strategy is: build as many miles of pipeline as possible. And what the industry is trying to do is to increase that level of infrastructure investment so our country won't be able to walk away from it". Kennedy supported Alexandria Ocasio-Cortez's Green New Deal resolution, saying in a 2020 interview, "I think the Green New Deal and all that stuff is important. We ought to be pursuing it. My approach is more market-based than kind of top-down dictates. You know, I believe that we should use market mechanisms like carbon taxes and the elimination of subsidies."

Kennedy has spoken against geoengineering, saying that geoengineering solutions are an attempt by big business to profit from climate change.

Kennedy has expressed support for regenerative farming, and in May 2023, he voiced support for agrarian movements, saying, "If we want to have democracy, we need a broad ownership of our land by a wide variety of yeoman farmers, each with a stake in our system." In 1995, Premier Ralph Klein of Alberta declared Kennedy persona non grata in the province due to his activism against Alberta's large-scale hog production facilities. In 2002, Smithfield Foods sued Kennedy in Poland under a Polish law that makes criticizing a corporation illegal after he denounced the company in a debate with Smithfield's Polish director before the Polish parliament.

Kennedy has opposed conventional nuclear power, arguing that it is unsafe and not economically competitive. In June 1981, he spoke at an anti-nuclear rally at the Hollywood Bowl with the musicians Stephen Stills, Bonnie Raitt, and Jackson Browne. He believes nuclear energy is a profit-making venture promoted by corporate lobbyists rather than environmental activists, and has claimed insurance companies are unwilling to insure nuclear plants, saying in a 2023 interview, "It's not hippies in tie-dyed T-shirts who are saying it's dangerous; it's guys on Wall Street with suits and ties."

Throughout the presidency of George W. Bush, Kennedy was critical of Bush's environmental and energy policies, saying Bush was defunding and corrupting federal science projects. Kennedy was also critical of Bush's 2003 hydrogen car initiative, arguing that, because of plans to extract the hydrogen from fossil fuels, it was a gift to the fossil fuel industry disguised as a green automobile. In 2003, Kennedy wrote an article in Rolling Stone about Bush's environmental record, which he expanded into a New York Times bestselling book. His opposition to the Bush administration's environmental policies earned him recognition as one of Rolling Stone's "100 Agents of Change" on April 2, 2009.

During an October 2012 interview with Politico, Kennedy called on environmentalists to direct their dissatisfaction toward Congress rather than President Barack Obama, reasoning that Obama "didn't deliver" due to having a partisan Congress "like we haven't seen before in American history". He said politicians who do not act on climate change policy serve special interests and sell out public trust. He said Charles and David Koch—the owners of Koch Industries, Inc., the nation's largest privately owned oil company—subverted democracy and made "themselves billionaires by impoverishing the rest of us".

Kennedy has spoken of the Koch brothers as leading "the apocalyptical forces of Ignorance and Greed". During the 2014 People's Climate March, he said: "The Koch brothers have all the money. They're putting $300 million this year into their efforts to stop the climate bill. And the only thing we have in our power is people power, and that's why we need to put this demonstration on the street."

In a 2020 interview on Yahoo Finance's "Influencers with Andy Serwer", Kennedy called President Trump's environmental policies a "cataclysm" and said Trump is "simply the radical step of a process that's been happening in our country and in the Republican Party from the past—really, since 1980—which is a growing hostility towards the environment, a growing orientation to representing the concentrated corporate power and power, particularly of the oil industry and the chemical industry and some of the other large polluting industries."

=== Drug use ===
Kennedy has said he intends to create "wellness farms" to rehabilitate illegal drug users, to be paid for from the revenue from taxing the sale of legalized cannabis. The farms' inmates would grow organic food, without access to computer technology. He has suggested that the farms might be used to treat people on psychiatric medications: "I'm going to create these wellness farms where they can go to get off of illegal drugs, off of opiates, but also illegal drugs, other psychiatric drugs, if they want to, to get off of SSRIs, to get off of benzos, to get off of Adderall, and to spend time as much time as they need—three or four years if they need it—to learn to get reparented, to reconnect with communities." Kennedy has said the farms would be compulsory only for illegal drug users.

=== Questioning the validity of elections ===
Kennedy has been critical of the integrity of the voting process. In June 2006, he published an article in Rolling Stone purporting to show that GOP operatives stole the 2004 presidential election for President George W. Bush. Most Democrats and Republicans regarded it as a conspiracy theory. The journalist Farhad Manjoo countered Kennedy's conclusions, writing: "If you do read Kennedy's article, be prepared to machete your way through numerous errors of interpretation and his deliberate omission of key bits of data."

Kennedy has written about the ease of election hacking and the dangers of voter purges and voter-identification laws. He wrote the introduction and a chapter in Billionaires and Ballot Bandits, a 2012 book on election hacking by the investigative journalist Greg Palast.

=== Political endorsements ===
Kennedy worked on his uncle Sargent Shriver's 1976 presidential campaign in Massachusetts, and later was on the national staff and a state coordinator for his uncle Ted Kennedy's 1980 presidential campaign.

Kennedy endorsed and campaigned for Vice President Al Gore during his 2000 presidential campaign and openly opposed Ralph Nader's Green Party presidential campaign.

In the 2004 presidential election, Kennedy endorsed John Kerry, noting his strong environmental record. After Kerry lost the election to George W. Bush, Kennedy wrote an article for Rolling Stone falsely claiming that the results were fraudulent and that the election was stolen from Kerry, basing his argument on discrepancies between exit polling and reported results in swing states such as Ohio, as well as voter disenfranchisement.

In late 2007, Kennedy and his sisters Kerry and Kathleen endorsed Hillary Clinton in the 2008 Democratic Party presidential primaries. After the Democratic Convention, Kennedy campaigned for Obama across the country. After the election, the Obama administration was reportedly considering Kennedy for administrator of the Environmental Protection Agency, but felt his controversial statements and arrest for heroin possession in the 1980s made him unlikely to win Senate confirmation.

In 2016, Kennedy called supporters of then-presidential candidate Donald Trump "belligerent idiots" and suggested that some were "outright Nazis". He also characterized Trump as a "bully" and a "threat to democracy", comparing him to Adolf Hitler and George Wallace.

In 2024, Kennedy endorsed Trump for president at a Trump campaign rally in Arizona.

== Anti-vaccine advocacy and conspiracy theories on public health ==
Kennedy is a prominent voice in the anti-vaccine movement, spreading anti-vaccine misinformation, disinformation, and propaganda. The infectious disease specialist Michael Osterholm has said that Kennedy's "anti-vaccine disinformation" is effective "because it's portrayed to the public with graphs and figures and what appears to be scientific data. He has perfected the art of illusion of fact." Osterholm added:

This is about people's lives. And the consequences of promoting this kind of disinformation, as credible as it may seem, is simply dangerous.

Kennedy has said that he is not against vaccines but wants them to be more thoroughly tested and investigated. In Thimerosal: Let the Science Speak (2015), he writes that he does not see himself as anti-vaccine: "People who advocate for safer vaccines should not be marginalized or denounced as anti-vaccine. I am pro-vaccine. I had all six of my children vaccinated. I believe that vaccines have saved the lives of hundreds of millions of humans over the past century and that broad vaccine coverage is critical to public health. But I want our vaccines to be as safe as possible." But in 2023, Kennedy said, "There's no vaccine that is safe and effective."

In January 2024, Kennedy published a podcast about Lyme disease in which he said it is "highly likely to have been a military weapon" developed at the Plum Island Animal Disease Center. Multiple experts and authoritative sources have debunked the charge and called it "absurd".

=== Vaccines and autism claims ===
From 2015 to 2023, Kennedy chaired Children's Health Defense, an anti-vaccine advocacy group. In its early years, the group focused on mercury in industry and medicine, especially the ethylmercury used in thimerosal in vaccines.

The group alleges that exposure to certain chemicals and radiation has caused a range of conditions in many American children, including autism, attention deficit hyperactivity disorder (ADHD), food allergies, cancer, and autoimmune diseases. Children's Health Defense has blamed and campaigned against vaccines, fluoridation of drinking water, acetaminophen (paracetamol), aluminum, and wireless communication, among other things. The group has been identified as one of two major buyers of anti-vaccine Facebook advertising in 2018 and 2019. Members of his family have criticized Kennedy and his organization, saying he spreads "dangerous misinformation" and that his work has "heartbreaking" consequences.

Kennedy and Children's Health Defense have falsely claimed that vaccines cause autism. Kennedy focused on the subset of vaccines that contained thimerosal, a mercury-based anti-microbial that has been falsely claimed to cause autism. Thimerosal has never been used in MMR, chickenpox, pneumococcal conjugate, or inactivated polio vaccines. In 2001, thimerosal was removed from all other childhood (under six years old) vaccines except for a few versions of flu and hepatitis vaccines. No childhood vaccine now contains more than traces (1 microgram or less) of thimerosal, except for flu, which is also available without thimerosal in the US. For those six years and older, including pregnant women, all vaccines are now available in versions with only trace amounts of thimerosal.

In 2015, Kennedy participated in a Speakers' Forum to promote the film Trace Amounts, which promotes the discredited claim of a link between autism and mercury in vaccinations. He called the increased diagnosis of cases of autism a "holocaust". He has been heavily criticized for such statements.

In 2020, the Center for Countering Digital Hate said that Kennedy uses his status as an environmental activist to bolster the anti-vaccination movement, appearing in online conversations with the discredited British former doctor Andrew Wakefield, the anti-vaccination activist Del Bigtree, and the conspiracy theorist Rashid Buttar. Journalist Brian Deer wrote that Kennedy is friends with Wakefield and Bigtree. Deer describes Wakefield as "a former doctor whose medical license was revoked in his native Britain in 2010 amid charges of ethical violations." In 2019 (days before his letter to Samoa), Kennedy said, "In any just society, we would be building statues to Andy Wakefield." Kennedy has worked with Nation of Islam leader Louis Farrakhan to promote the conspiracy theory that vaccines are intentionally used to hurt black people. Kennedy met with Farrakhan in 2015 and spoke at a Nation of Islam event in 2021 on vaccines, calling Farrakhan a "truly great partner". In 2023, during his presidential campaign, Kennedy denounced Farrakhan, claiming he was unaware of his antisemitic views, but Kennedy had disparaged Farrakhan's "Jewish xenophobia" years earlier in his diary. Kennedy and the Children's Health Defense have cooperated with internet streamer and antisemitic conspiracy theorist James Corbett to promote antivaccine views.

Kennedy is listed as executive producer of Vaxxed II: The People's Truth, the 2019 sequel to Wakefield's and Bigtree's anti-vaccination propaganda film Vaxxed.

In February 2021, Kennedy's Instagram account was deleted "for repeatedly sharing debunked claims" about COVID-19 vaccines. In March 2021, the Center for Countering Digital Hate identified Kennedy as one of 12 people responsible for 65% of anti-vaccine content on Facebook and Twitter.

Kennedy has said that governments and the media are conspiring to deny that vaccines cause autism.

==== Writings and speeches promoting anti-vaccine theories ====
In 2005, Kennedy wrote an article, "Deadly Immunity", that appeared in Rolling Stone and Salon.com and alleged a government conspiracy to conceal a connection between thimerosal and childhood neurodevelopmental disorders, including autism. The article contained factual errors, leading Salon to issue five corrections. Joan Walsh, Salon.com's editor-in-chief and sole Salon editor of the piece, said she had mistakenly relied on Rolling Stone's fact-checking, a process she later learned was "less than arduous". As soon as the piece was up, she said, "We were besieged by scientists and advocates showing how Kennedy had misunderstood, incorrectly cited, and perhaps even falsified data ... It was the worst mistake of my career. I probably should have been fired."

In 2011, Salon.com retracted the article in its entirety. It said the retraction was motivated by accumulating evidence of alleged errors and scientific fraud underlying the vaccine-autism claim. A corrected version of the article was published on Rolling Stone's website. Kennedy said on The Joe Rogan Experience—and was paraphrased in The New York Times as saying—that "Salon caved to pressure from government regulators and the pharmaceutical industry." Walsh responded: "That's just another lie. We caved to pressure from the incontrovertible truth and our journalistic consciences."

In 2013, Kennedy delivered the keynote address at the anti-vaccination AutismOne / Generation Rescue conference.

In 2014, Kennedy's book Thimerosal: Let the Science Speak: The Evidence Supporting the Immediate Removal of Mercury—a Known Neurotoxin—from Vaccines, was published. While methylmercury is a potent neurotoxin, thimerosal is not. According to the CDC, there is "no convincing evidence of harm caused by the low doses of thimerosal in vaccines". The book's preface is by Mark Hyman, a proponent of the alternative medical treatment called functional medicine. Kennedy has published articles on the inclusion of thimerosal in vaccines.

==== Meeting with Donald Trump ====
In January 2017, incoming White House press secretary Sean Spicer confirmed that Kennedy and President-elect Donald Trump met to discuss a position in the Trump administration. Kennedy said he had accepted an offer from Trump to chair the Vaccine Safety Task Force, but a spokeswoman for Trump's transition said no final decision had been made. In an August 2017 interview with STAT News reporter Helen Branswell, Kennedy said he had been meeting with federal public health regulators at the White House's request to discuss defects in vaccine safety science.

==== Controversy with Robert De Niro ====
In February 2017, Kennedy and actor Robert De Niro gave a press conference at the National Press Club in Washington, in which they said the press was working for the vaccination industry and did not allow debates on vaccination science. They offered a $100,000 reward to any journalist or citizen who could point to a study showing that it is safe to inject mercury into babies and pregnant women at levels currently contained in flu vaccines. Craig Foster, a psychology professor who studies pseudoscience, deemed the challenge "not science", calling it a "carefully constructed 'contest' that allows its creators to generate the misleading outcome they presumably want to see". Foster added, "Proving that something is safe is importantly different than proving that something is harmful."

==== Samoa measles outbreak ====
In 2019, during a visit to Samoa, coinciding with its 57th annual independence celebration, Kennedy appeared in an Instagram photo with Australian-Samoan anti-vaccine activist Taylor Winterstein. Kennedy's charity and Winterstein have perpetuated the allegation that the MMR vaccine played a role in the 2018 deaths of two Samoan infants, despite the revelation that the infants had mistakenly received a muscle relaxant along with the vaccine. Kennedy has drawn criticism for fueling vaccine hesitancy amid a social climate, that gave rise to the 2019 Samoa measles outbreak, which killed over 70 people, and the 2019 Tonga measles outbreak.

==== Tylenol and autism-related health policies ====
At a White House press briefing on September 22, 2025, President Trump, joined by Kennedy and other senior officials, said the FDA would revise drug labels to discourage the use of acetaminophen in Tylenol during pregnancy, citing a possible link to autism. Medical scientists disagreed with this recommendation. Steven J. Fleischman, president of the American College of Obstetricians and Gynecologists, wrote, "It is highly unsettling that our federal health agencies are willing to make an announcement that will affect the health and well-being of millions of people without the backing of reliable data."

On October 29, Kennedy retracted his statements from the press conference, saying that Tylenol use in pregnancy is not linked to autism. That same day, Kennedy and Trump backed the FDA approval of the chemotherapy drug leucovorin to also help alleviate the symptoms of autism. Their justification for this approval was based on limited evidence.

==== Allegations about circumcision ====
On October 9, 2025, Kennedy alleged a link between autism and circumcision, citing a 2015 Danish study. Scientists have rejected Kennedy's assertion about a link between autism and circumcision.

=== COVID-19 ===
During the COVID-19 pandemic, Kennedy promoted conspiracy theories including false claims that Anthony Fauci and the Bill & Melinda Gates Foundation were trying to profit off a vaccine, and Bill Gates would cut off access to money for people who do not get vaccinated, allowing them to starve. In August 2020, Kennedy appeared in an interview with Alec Baldwin on Instagram and touted incorrect claims about vaccines and public health measures related to the pandemic. Health officials and scientists criticized Baldwin for letting Kennedy's claims go unchallenged.

In May 2021, Kennedy petitioned the FDA to rescind authorization for all current and future COVID vaccines. The vaccines had saved about 140,000 lives in the US. John Moore, a professor of immunology, called Kennedy's request "an appalling error of judgment".

Kennedy has promoted misinformation about the COVID-19 vaccine, falsely suggesting that it contributed to the death of Hank Aaron and others. In February 2021, his Instagram account was blocked for "repeatedly sharing debunked claims about the coronavirus or vaccines". The Center for Countering Digital Hate identified Kennedy as one of the main propagators of conspiracy theories about Bill Gates and 5G phone technology. His conspiracy theory activities considerably increased his social media impact. In 2020 his Instagram account grew from 121,000 followers to 454,000.

Kennedy has expressed skepticism about the COVID-19 pandemic, contending that it served to benefit billionaires. According to Kennedy, the pandemic resulted in a "$4.4 trillion shift in wealth from the American middle class to this new oligarchy that we created—500 new billionaires with the lockdowns, and the billionaires that we already had increased their wealth by 30%".

In November 2021, Kennedy's book The Real Anthony Fauci: Bill Gates, Big Pharma, and the Global War on Democracy and Public Health was published. In it, Kennedy alleges that Fauci sabotaged treatments for AIDS, violated federal laws, and conspired with Gates and social media companies to suppress information about COVID cures, to leave vaccines as the only option to fight the pandemic. Kennedy calls Fauci a "powerful technocrat who helped orchestrate and execute 2020's historic coup d'état against Western democracy". He claims without proof that Fauci and Gates had schemed to prolong the pandemic and exaggerate its effects, promoting expensive vaccinations for the benefit of "a powerful vaccine cartel".

The book repeats discredited myths about the pandemic, notably about the effectiveness of ivermectin. The Neue Zürcher Zeitung wrote that "polemics alternate with chapters that pedantically seek to substantiate Kennedy's accusations with numerous quotations and studies". Kennedy released a video depicting Fauci with a Hitler mustache. In response, Fauci called Kennedy "a very disturbed individual" and said that, having met with Kennedy to discuss vaccines, he "[doesn't] know what's going on in [Kennedy's] head, but it's not good".

Kennedy wrote the foreword to Plague of Corruption, a 2020 book by the former research scientist and anti-vaccine conspiracy theorist Judy Mikovits.

In August 2020, Kennedy appeared as a speaker at a partially violent demonstration in Berlin where populist groups called for an end to restrictions caused by COVID. His YouTube account was removed in September 2021 for breaking policies on vaccine misinformation.

In January 2022, during a speech at an anti-vaccination rally on the National Mall in Washington D.C., Kennedy said: "Even in Hitler's Germany, you could cross the Alps into Switzerland, you could hide in the attic like Anne Frank did. Today the mechanisms are being put in place that will make it so none of us can run, none of us can hide." The Auschwitz Memorial responded on Twitter: "Exploiting of the tragedy of people who suffered, were humiliated, tortured & murdered by the totalitarian regime of Nazi Germany—including children like Anne Frank—in a debate about vaccines & limitations during global pandemic is a sad symptom of moral & intellectual decay." Kennedy's wife, the actress Cheryl Hines, also condemned his comments, tweeting that the reference to Frank was "reprehensible and insensitive". Two days later, Kennedy apologized. In June 2023, Instagram reinstated his account.

In July 2023, at a private dinner, Kennedy was recorded saying, "There is an argument that [COVID-19] is ethnically targeted", adding, "COVID-19 is targeted to attack Caucasians and Black people. The people who are the most immune are Ashkenazi Jews and Chinese ... we don't know whether it's deliberately targeted or not." The American Jewish Committee and Anti-Defamation League condemned his remarks, with the latter saying that Kennedy's statement "feeds into sinophobic and antisemitic conspiracy theories".

Kennedy responded that he "never, ever suggested that the COVID-19 virus was targeted to spare Jews" and that he does not "believe and never implied that the ethnic effect was deliberately engineered". He explained his remarks by citing a 2021 study that he said showed that "COVID-19 appears to disproportionately affect certain races" due to racial differences in the effectiveness of COVID-19's furin cleave docking site, thus serving "as a kind of proof of concept for ethnically targeted bioweapons". Experts strongly criticized these further claims, saying the study said nothing about Chinese people or bioweapons and that Chinese people and Ashkenazi Jews contract COVID-19 at rates similar to other ethnic groups and nationalities. The virologist Angela Rasmussen said, "Jewish or Chinese protease consensus sequences are not a thing in biochemistry, but they are in racism and antisemitism."

=== Medical racism conspiracy theory ===
Kennedy targets Black Americans with anti-vaccine propaganda and conspiracy theories, linking vaccination with instances of medical racism such as the Tuskegee Syphilis Study. Echoing others in the anti-vaccination movement, Children's Health Defense claimed that the U.S. government seeks to harm ethnic minorities by prioritizing them for COVID-19 vaccines. In March 2021, Children's Health Defense released an anti-vaccine propaganda video, "Medical Racism: The New Apartheid", that promotes COVID-19 conspiracy theories and claims that COVID-19 vaccination efforts are medical experiments on Black people. Kennedy appears in the video, inviting viewers to disregard information dispensed by health authorities and doctors. Brandi Collin-Dexter, a Fellow at the Shorenstein Center on Media, Politics and Public Policy, said, "the notorious figures and false narratives in the documentary were recognizable" and "the film's incompatible narratives sought to take advantage of the pain felt by Black communities." At the urging of disinformation experts, the film was removed from Facebook, but Kennedy was permitted to keep his account.

=== HIV/AIDS denialism ===
In his 2021 book The Real Anthony Fauci: Bill Gates, Big Pharma, and the War on Democracy and Public Health, Kennedy writes that he takes "no position on the relationship between HIV and AIDS", but spent over 100 pages quoting HIV denialists such as Peter Duesberg who question the isolation of HIV and the etiology of AIDS. Kennedy refers to the "orthodoxy that HIV alone causes AIDS" and the "theology that HIV is the sole cause of AIDS", and repeats the false HIV/AIDS denialist claim that no one has isolated the HIV virion and "No one has been able to point to a study that demonstrates their hypothesis using accepted scientific proofs." He also repeats the false claim that the early AIDS drug AZT is "absolutely fatal" due to its "horrendous toxicity".

Molecular biologist Dan Wilson said that Kennedy falsely claimed that Luc Montagnier, the discoverer of HIV, was a "convert" to Duesberg's fringe hypothesis. Wilson concludes that Kennedy is a "full blown" HIV/AIDS denialist. Epidemiologist Tara C. Smith suggests that Kennedy's book "even flirts with outright germ theory denial", quoting from a portion in which Kennedy contrasts the germ theory of disease with terrain theory and another in which he writes that Louis Pasteur "is said to have recanted" germ theory on his deathbed in favor of Antoine Béchamp's terrain theory, an unproven claim that circulates among germ theory denialists.

=== Chemtrail conspiracy theory ===
In August 2024, after endorsing Trump for president and starting to work with Trump's campaign, Kennedy posted, "We are going to stop this crime" of chemtrails. Belief in chemtrails involves a conspiracy theory that airplane water vapor trails (contrails) are purposely dumped chemicals designed to harm people.

=== Miasma theory ===
Kennedy praises what he calls "miasma theory", which he says "emphasizes preventing disease by fortifying the immune system through nutrition and reducing exposures to environmental toxins and stresses". Historians say this is an inaccurate understanding of miasma theory, which has been debunked.

=== Pushback from the Kennedy family ===
Several members of Kennedy's close family have distanced themselves from his anti-vaccination activities and conspiracy theories on public health, and condemned his comments equating public health measures with Nazi war crimes. In May 2019, his niece Maeve Kennedy McKean and elder siblings Kathleen and Joseph wrote an open letter saying that while Kennedy has championed admirable causes, he "has helped to spread dangerous misinformation over social media and is complicit in sowing distrust of the science behind vaccines". They cited the roles played by President John F. Kennedy and Senator Ted Kennedy in (respectively) signing and reauthorizing the Vaccination Assistance Act of 1962.

On December 30, 2020, another niece, Kerry Kennedy Meltzer, a physician, wrote a similar open letter, saying that her uncle published misinformation about COVID vaccines' side effects. John F. Kennedy's daughter Caroline Kennedy said her family was generally united in supporting public health infrastructure, citing the work of Ted Kennedy and Eunice Kennedy Shriver. She added, "I think Bobby Kennedy [Jr.]'s views on vaccines are dangerous, but I don't think that most Americans share them..."

In January 2025, Caroline Kennedy publicly denounced Kennedy in a letter she sent U.S. senators calling him a "predator" and "hypocrite" who was unqualified to be the secretary of the Department of Health and Human Services. She accused him of animal cruelty and "encouraging" other family members, such as his brother David Kennedy, into substance abuse that led to addiction, illness, and death. Caroline Kennedy's cousin Stephen Smith Jr. said, "I completely support my cousin Caroline's view that RFK Jr. is unqualified...for the role of Secty of HHS."

== Other views ==
=== Animal testing ===
Kennedy has said he is "deeply committed to ending animal experimentation" and proposed curtailing the use of primates in research. He has directed federal agencies to prioritize and refine alternatives to animal testing such as 3D bioprinting.

=== Assassinations of John F. Kennedy and Robert F. Kennedy ===
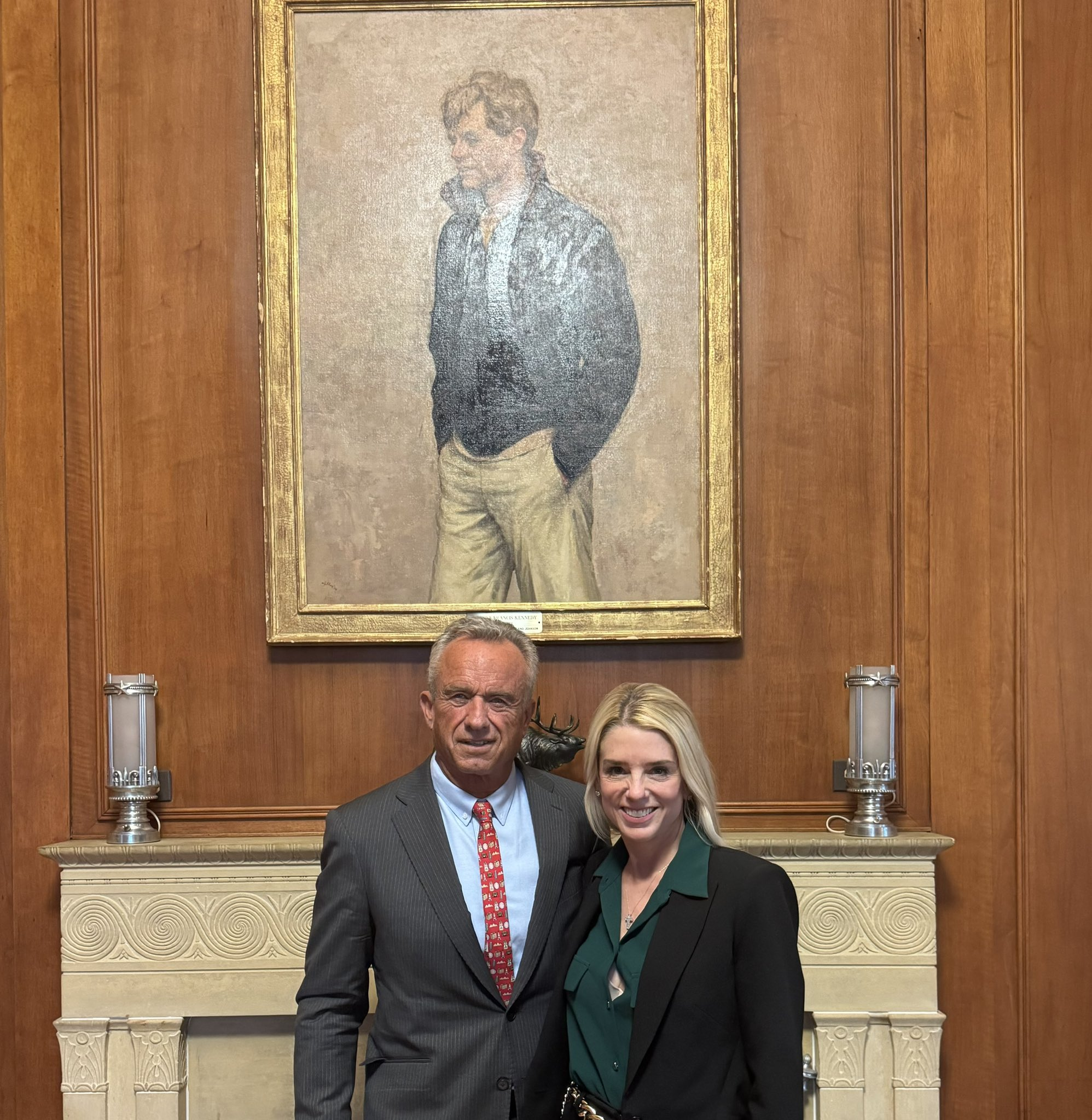
Kennedy with Attorney General Pam Bondi beneath a portrait of his father, Robert F. Kennedy, in March 2025

On the evening of January 11, 2013, Charlie Rose interviewed Kennedy and his sister Rory at the Winspear Opera House in Dallas as a part of then Dallas mayor Mike Rawlings's hand-chosen committee's year-long program of celebrating John F. Kennedy's life and presidency. Of JFK's assassination, RFK Jr. said his father was "fairly convinced" Lee Harvey Oswald had not acted alone and believed the Warren Commission report was a "shoddy piece of craftsmanship". RFK Jr. said, "The evidence at this point I think is very, very convincing that it was not a lone gunman." He endorsed the 2013 edition of JFK and the Unspeakable, saying it had moved him to visit Dealey Plaza for the first time. He was interviewed for the 2021 documentary film JFK Revisited: Through the Looking Glass.

In November 2023, RFK Jr. launched a petition on his presidential campaign website for the Biden administration to release the estimated remaining 1% of documents related to the case. He said that finally releasing full and unredacted documents could help restore trust in the government.

In an interview on Lex Fridman's podcast, Kennedy said that the evidence that the CIA was involved in the assassination was "beyond any reasonable doubt".

Kennedy does not believe that Sirhan Sirhan fired the shot that killed his father, Robert F. Kennedy. Based on the testimony of eyewitnesses, especially Paul Schrade, who was standing next to Kennedy and was shot himself, as well as the autopsy, he believes there was a second gunman. In December 2017, he visited Richard J. Donovan Correctional Facility near San Diego to meet Sirhan. After meeting Sirhan, he gave his support for a reinvestigation of the assassination.

=== Fertility ===
In April 2025, Kennedy said: "We have fertility rates that are just spiraling. A teenager today, an American teenager, has less testosterone than a 68-year-old man. Sperm counts are down 50%." In October 2025, he said that teenage girls are reaching puberty six years earlier. In May 2026, he said that men in 1970 had twice the sperm count of modern teenagers. He described the country as undergoing a "fertility crisis" that threatens the economy and national security, and attributed the crisis to endocrine-disrupting chemicals, pesticides, and other factors causing hormonal imbalances.

=== Food allergies ===
Kennedy was a founding board member of the Food Allergy Initiative. His son has anaphylactic peanut allergies. Kennedy wrote the foreword to The Peanut Allergy Epidemic, in which he and the authors falsely link increasing food allergies in children to certain vaccines that were approved beginning in 1989.

=== Gender dysphoria ===
In a June 2023 podcast interview with Jordan Peterson, Kennedy posited that several issues in children, including gender dysphoria, might be linked to atrazine contamination in the water supply. He cited a 2010 study by Hayes that claims that acute atrazine exposure causes chemical castration and feminization in frogs, leading some to become hermaphrodites. Kennedy suggested that there was other evidence indicating potential effects on humans. YouTube removed the interview under its vaccine misinformation policy, a decision Peterson and Kennedy criticized as censorship. Andrea Gore, a professor of neuroendocrinology at the University of Texas at Austin, said, "I don't think people should be making statements about the relationship between environmental chemicals and changes in sexuality when there's zero evidence." Several scientists interviewed by Axios said the hypothesis lacked evidence. Following media criticism, a spokesperson for Kennedy's 2024 presidential campaign told CNN that he was being mischaracterized and that he was not claiming that endocrine disruptors were the sole cause of gender dysphoria, but rather proposing further research.

=== Murder of Martha Moxley ===
In 2003, Kennedy published an article in The Atlantic Monthly about the 1975 murder of Martha Moxley in Greenwich, Connecticut, in which he insists that his cousin Michael Skakel's indictment "was triggered by an inflamed media, and that an innocent man is now in prison". Kennedy argues that evidence suggests that Kenneth Littleton, the Skakel family's live-in tutor, killed Moxley, and calls investigative journalist Dominick Dunne the "driving force" behind Skakel's prosecution. In 2016, Kennedy released the book Framed: Why Michael Skakel Spent over a Decade in Prison for a Murder He Didn't Commit. In 2017, the rights to the book were optioned by FX Productions to develop a multi-part television series.

In 2018, Skakel's conviction was vacated, and in 2020, prosecutors decided not to seek a new trial.

=== Nicotine ===
Kennedy regularly uses nicotine pouches and has said that nicotine "does not cause cancer".

=== Raw milk ===
Kennedy says he drinks only raw milk and believes it has health benefits. In October 2024, he accused the FDA of "aggressive suppression" of raw milk. Experts and the FDA say raw milk has disease risks and is not more nutritious.

=== Tanning beds ===
Despite federal warnings against using tanning beds due to the increased risk of skin cancer, Kennedy regularly uses them, saying, "I'm not telling people that they should do anything that I do. I just say 'Get in shape.'"

=== Testosterone ===
Kennedy said he doesn't take anabolic steroids but does take testosterone, which is an anabolic-androgenic steroid.
