= Robert F. Kennedy Jr. 2024 presidential campaign =

American political campaign

Robert F. Kennedy Jr. for President 2024
- Campaign: 2024 U.S. presidential election 2024 Democratic primaries (until October 9, 2023)
- Candidate: Robert F. Kennedy Jr. Environmental lawyer (for President); Nicole Shanahan; Lawyer and technologist (for Vice President)
- Affiliation: Independent; Democratic Party (until October 9, 2023)
- Announced: April 19, 2023
- Suspended: August 23, 2024 (Note: Remained on the ballot in multiple states despite suspension.)
- Headquarters: Walpole, Massachusetts
- Key people: Amaryllis Fox Kennedy (campaign manager); Dennis Kucinich (campaign manager until October 13, 2023); Charles Eisenstein (senior advisor); John E. Sullivan (treasurer); Del Bigtree (communications director); Stefanie Spear (campaign press secretary)
- Receipts: US$64,705,818.71 (November 25, 2024)
- Slogan(s): Declare Your Independence; Heal the Divide; The Remedy Is Kennedy; The America That Almost Was, and Yet May Be; America Strong; Make America Healthy Again

Website
- kennedy24.com

Robert F. Kennedy Jr. announced his campaign for the 2024 United States presidential election on April 19, 2023. An environmental lawyer, writer, and member of the Kennedy family, he is known for advocating anti-vaccine misinformation and a variety of public health conspiracy theories. He initially ran for the Democratic Party nomination, but announced on October 9, 2023, that he would run as an independent candidate.

Kennedy initially received support from independents and youth, while also drawing significant support from Republican Party donors and allies of Donald Trump who believed he would serve as a spoiler for then Democrats' candidate President Joe Biden. His campaign also received strong support and praise from various tech industry executives in Silicon Valley and was nominated by the US Reform Party. Reactions to his campaign from his extended family were largely negative.

On August 23, 2024, Kennedy suspended the campaign operations and endorsed the campaign of the Republican nominee, former president Trump. Kennedy then began removing his name from the ballot in ten swing states—though he was unable to do so in Wisconsin and Michigan—although his name remained on ballots in red states and blue states. The following month, Kennedy began to withdraw from safe Republican-leaning states, to give the Trump campaign a better chance of winning. Trump appointed Kennedy as Secretary of Health and Human Services in his second cabinet.

== Background ==
Kennedy is a member of the Kennedy family, four of whom have previously run for the United States presidency. His uncle, John F. Kennedy, was elected president as a Democrat in 1960 after a successful presidential campaign. In subsequent decades, several other family members sought the Democratic Party presidential nomination, but have failed to be nominated. His father and namesake, Robert F. Kennedy, ran a campaign for the nomination in 1968, but he was assassinated before the party's nominating convention. His uncle-by-marriage, Sargent Shriver, was the Democratic nominee for vice president in 1972, and ran for the nomination in 1976, but later withdrew from the race. (Note: Shriver replaced Thomas Eagleton when he ran for vice president.) His uncle, Ted Kennedy, ran a campaign for the nomination in 1980, but was defeated in the primaries by then-incumbent president Jimmy Carter.

== Campaign ==
=== Announcement ===
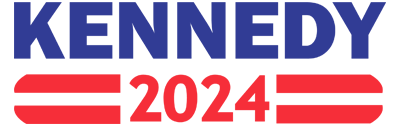
Kennedy's original presidential campaign logo

On March 3, 2023, in a speech at the New Hampshire Institute of Politics, Kennedy stated that he was considering a run for president in 2024. YouTube later took down a video of the speech, citing medical misinformation.

On April 5, 2023, Kennedy filed his candidacy with the Federal Election Commission (FEC). He formally declared his candidacy at a campaign launch event at the Park Plaza Hotel in Boston on April 19, 2023. He chose Boston for his launch because of his family's deep political roots in the city, and referenced in his speech that he graduated from both high school and college in Massachusetts.

In June 2023, because of Kennedy’s running for the 2024 Democratic Party presidential primaries, platform Instagram lifted its suspension against the account of RFKJ which dated back to February 2021 (see Views of Robert F. Kennedy Jr.#COVID-19), after Kennedy had complained that Instagram, by blocking an account of his Presidential campaign, was hindring the US democracy to function properly.

=== Personal security concerns ===
Early in his campaign, Kennedy expressed a belief that the CIA might kill him. "I gotta be careful," he said in an interview with Joe Rogan. "I'm not stupid about it and I take precautions." His comments echoed long-running conspiracy theories regarding his father and uncle's assassinations.

Since then, there have been multiple potential threats to Kennedy's life during his election campaign. He had been the subject of threats from an armed man impersonating a US marshal who was arrested at a Los Angeles campaign events. Kennedy has also received threatening emails indicating intentions to harm him, and an intruder attempted to unlawfully enter his Brentwood home, and managed to get over its fence and into its yard before being detained by Kennedy's personal security.

In 2023 Department of Homeland Security, in consultation with a bipartisan congressional advisory committee, denied Kennedy's multiple requests for Secret Service protection.

Kennedy responded by stating that: "Since the assassination of my father in 1968, candidates for president are provided Secret Service protection. But not me," and "Our campaign's request included a 67-page report from the world's leading protection firm, detailing unique and well established security and safety risks aside from commonplace death threats". As a result, Kennedy has initiated a public petition for granting him access to Secret Service protection.

Separate analyses by CNN and WJNO radio found that Kennedy had not been treated differently than other presidential candidates and had not yet met the requirements to automatically receive Secret Service protection.

Shortly after the July 13, 2024 attempted assassination of Republican candidate Donald Trump, President Biden ordered the Secret Service to provide protection for Kennedy.

=== Financing ===
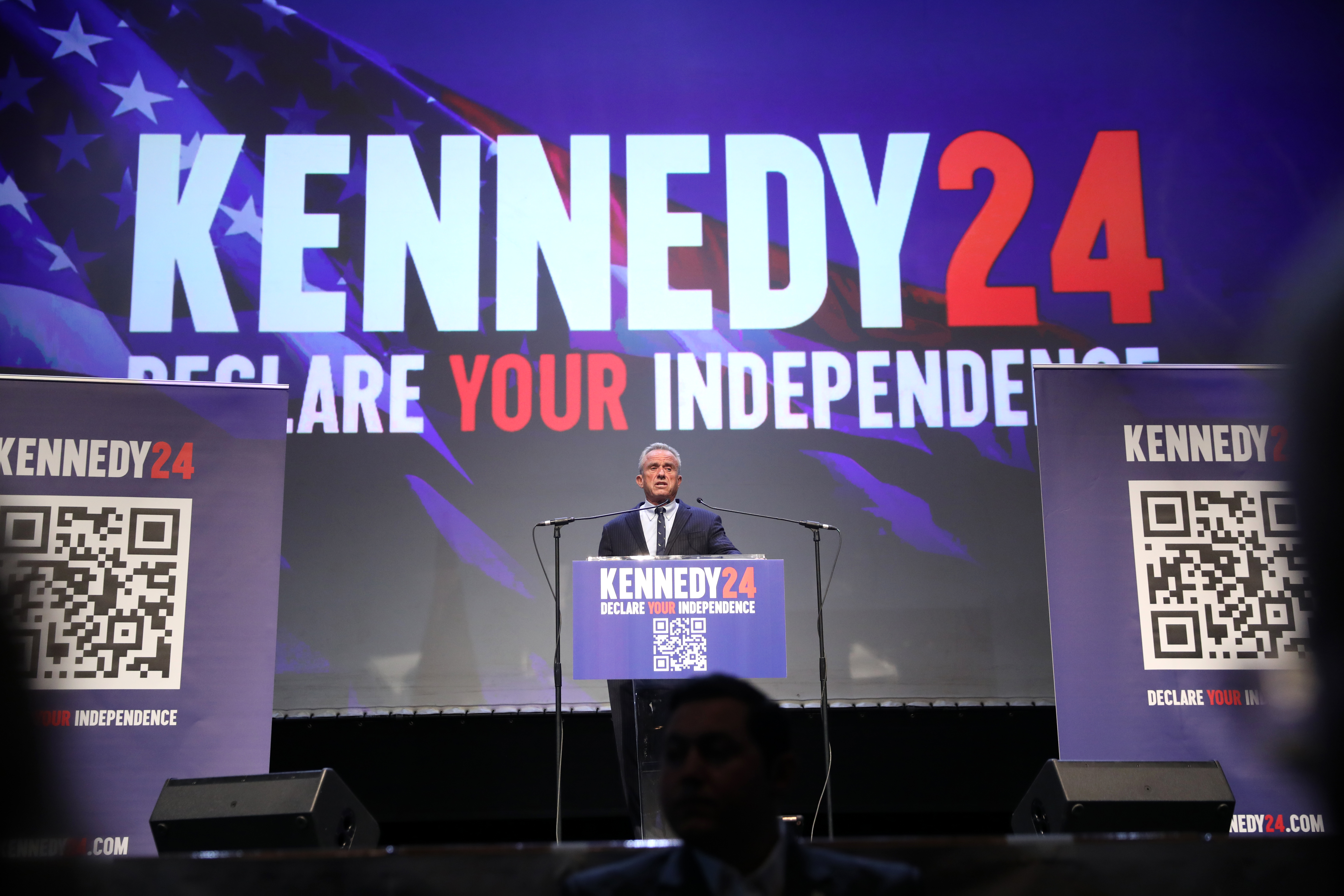
Kennedy at a campaign rally at the Fox Tucson Theatre in Tucson, Arizona

Kennedy has garnered financial backing from Republicans associated with former president Donald Trump. An analysis of the June 30, 2023, campaign finance filings shows that of the individuals who contributed at or near the maximum, those with Republican histories exceeded those with Democratic histories. About fifty percent of the total funds raised by American Values 2024, the super PAC that is supporting Kennedy's campaign, were contributed by Timothy Mellon, a longtime Republican mega-donor and Trump supporter. Kennedy's campaign finance report also showed substantial support from the anti-vaccine movement. Steve Kirsch, a promoter of disinformation about COVID-19 vaccines, donated over $10,000. Other notable donors include activist Abby Rockefeller of the Rockefeller family, billionaire Gavin de Becker, and anti-abortion advocate Mark Lee Dickson.

=== Party affiliation and personnel changes ===
On September 29, 2023, Mediaite reported that Kennedy was reorienting his campaign to run as an independent rather than as a Democrat. On October 9, 2023, he confirmed these reports by formally announcing that he would be continuing his presidential bid as an independent candidate. The announcement took place at an event held in Philadelphia. In his announcement speech, Kennedy criticized the Democratic and Republican parties for functioning as a "uniparty".

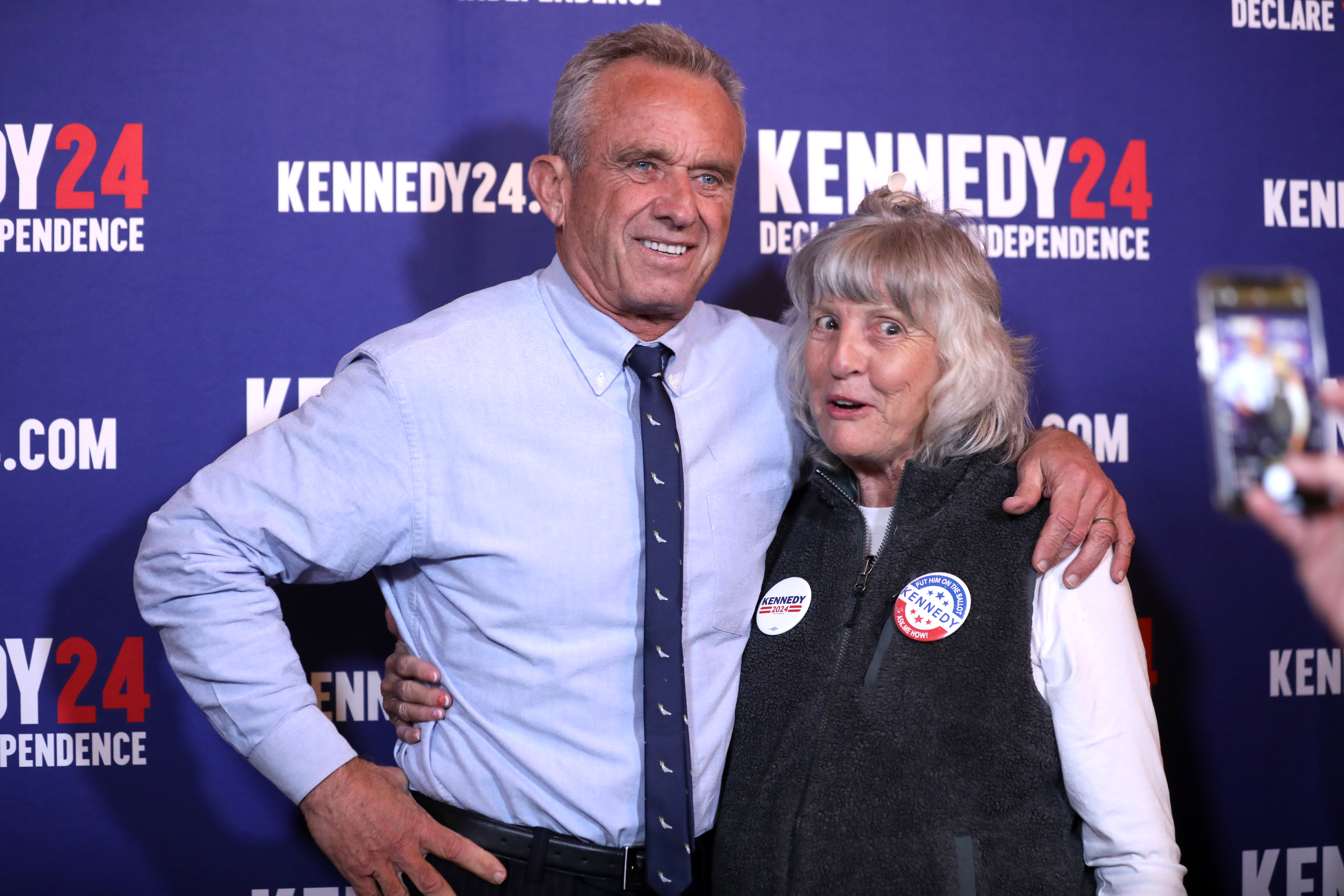
Kennedy with a supporter during the 2024 campaign

Prior to the switch Kennedy and his campaign manager, Dennis Kucinich, had expressed dissatisfaction with the Democratic primary election process. Considered an underdog, he often polled around the low double digits while running for the Democratic nomination, and had also been losing support in polls of Democratic primary voters. By switching to independent, he would no longer run in Democratic primary elections.

After Kennedy abandoned his run for the Democratic nomination in favor of an independent run, his campaign experienced turnover in a number of key positions. Campaign manager Dennis Kucinich stepped down, with Kennedy's daughter-in-law, Amaryllis Fox Kennedy taking on the leadership role. In early January 2024, Del Bigtree replaced Stefanie Spear as communications director.

=== Super Bowl commercial ===
The 1960 Kennedy campaign ad that the super PAC's 2024 ad was based on

On February 11, 2024, during Super Bowl LVIII, the American Values 2024 super PAC ran a 30-second television spot in support of Kennedy consisting of an edited version of a John F. Kennedy spot from his 1960 campaign. The ad used the same jingle and motif, replacing John F. Kennedy's images with those of Robert F. Kennedy Jr., and replacing text that said "Vote Democratic" with "Vote Independent." It was the only campaign advertisement which aired nationally during the game and reportedly cost US$7 million. Kennedy's cousin, Bobby Shriver, criticized the advertisement for using the likeness of his mother, Eunice Kennedy Shriver, whom he believed "would be appalled by [Kennedy Jr.'s] deadly health care views." Kennedy subsequently issued an apology on Twitter, stating the ad was created without any involvement from his campaign. Kennedy's account posted the advertisement and retweeted reactions to it before the apology was made.

The impetus for the ad came from Tony Lyons, co-chair of American Values 2024, and Nicole Shanahan, who provided $4 million and helped coordinate production. Shanahan, who was later selected as Kennedy's running mate, is a tech entrepreneur who has donated to Democratic candidates. Lyons is president and publisher of Skyhorse Publishing, which publishes many of Kennedy's books.

=== Vice presidential selection ===
Attorney and philanthropist Nicole Shanahan was announced as Kennedy's running mate for vice president on March 26, 2024. Following the announcement, the campaign said it would work on ballot access in 19 states where a running mate is a precondition for being on the ballot.

The campaign had announced on March 12 that Kennedy had selected a running mate from a shortlist that included former U.S. Representative Tulsi Gabbard, U.S. Senator Rand Paul, professional football player Aaron Rodgers, former Minnesota governor Jesse Ventura, and entrepreneur Andrew Yang. Other potential candidates that met with Kennedy include motivational speaker Tony Robbins, television host Mike Rowe, and civil rights attorney Tricia Lindsay. On March 16, Mediaite reported that Kennedy would select Shanahan, and his campaign manager confirmed she was under consideration. Gabbard has said that Kennedy offered her the vice presidential position, but she "respectfully declined" it.

=== CNN debate ===
The Kennedy Campaign initially intended to meet the debate requirements which were as follows:

- File with the Federal Election Commission;
- Be constitutionally eligible to hold the presidency;
- Appear on a sufficient number of state ballots to have a mathematical possibility of winning a majority vote in the Electoral College;
- Agree to the rules of the debate; and
- Reach at least 15% support in four national public opinion polls selected by CNN between March 13 and June 20, 2024.

Kennedy met the threshold in four and then three after CNN removed Monmouth University from their list of accepted polls. Kennedy also did not meet the ballot requirement, having been confirmed in only five states at the time of the debate.

Although Trump claimed to have no objection to Kennedy participating in the debate, the Trump campaign was later reported to have received "assurances" that Kennedy would not be invited. The Biden campaign opposed Kennedy's inclusion and reportedly told CNN that the president would only participate in a two person debate.

On May 29, Kennedy filed a complaint with the Federal Election Commission alleging that the Biden and Trump campaigns colluded to prevent him from appearing at the debate following a statement from an FEC chair that Kennedy's exclusion was illegal under FEC law. The claim was that the ballot access requirement was unfairly applied, neither Biden or Trump had secured ballot access in any state as their respective conventions had not yet occurred.

In response to not being allowed into the televised debate, Kennedy counterprogrammed it with a campaign event in Los Angeles dubbed "The Real Debate"—livestreamed on Rumble and X—where moderator John Stossel asked Kennedy the same questions that were posed to Biden and Trump.

=== Campaign suspension and endorsement of Trump ===
In April 2023, Vice reported that Roger Stone and others had promoted the idea of a Trump-Kennedy ticket. However, Kennedy indicated that he would not join such a ticket, asserting that both Trump's and Biden's policies had failed. In January 2024, Kennedy confirmed that Trump's team had reached out to him about possibly serving as vice president. Kennedy declined and also stated that he would not accept it if offered it again. On July 13, 2024, about three hours after Trump's assassination attempt in Pennsylvania, health care entrepreneur Calley Means called him on behalf of Trump, suggesting it was perhaps the right moment for an alliance. Kennedy told him he was not interested at first, but a short while later, he called back and said he was willing to speak with Trump. Three days later, on July 16, Kennedy apologized after his son had leaked the private phone call between him and Trump during which Trump seemingly attempted to coax Kennedy into supporting him, stating "I would love you to do something. And I think it'll be so good for you and so big for you. And we're going to win", to which Kennedy replied, "yeah".

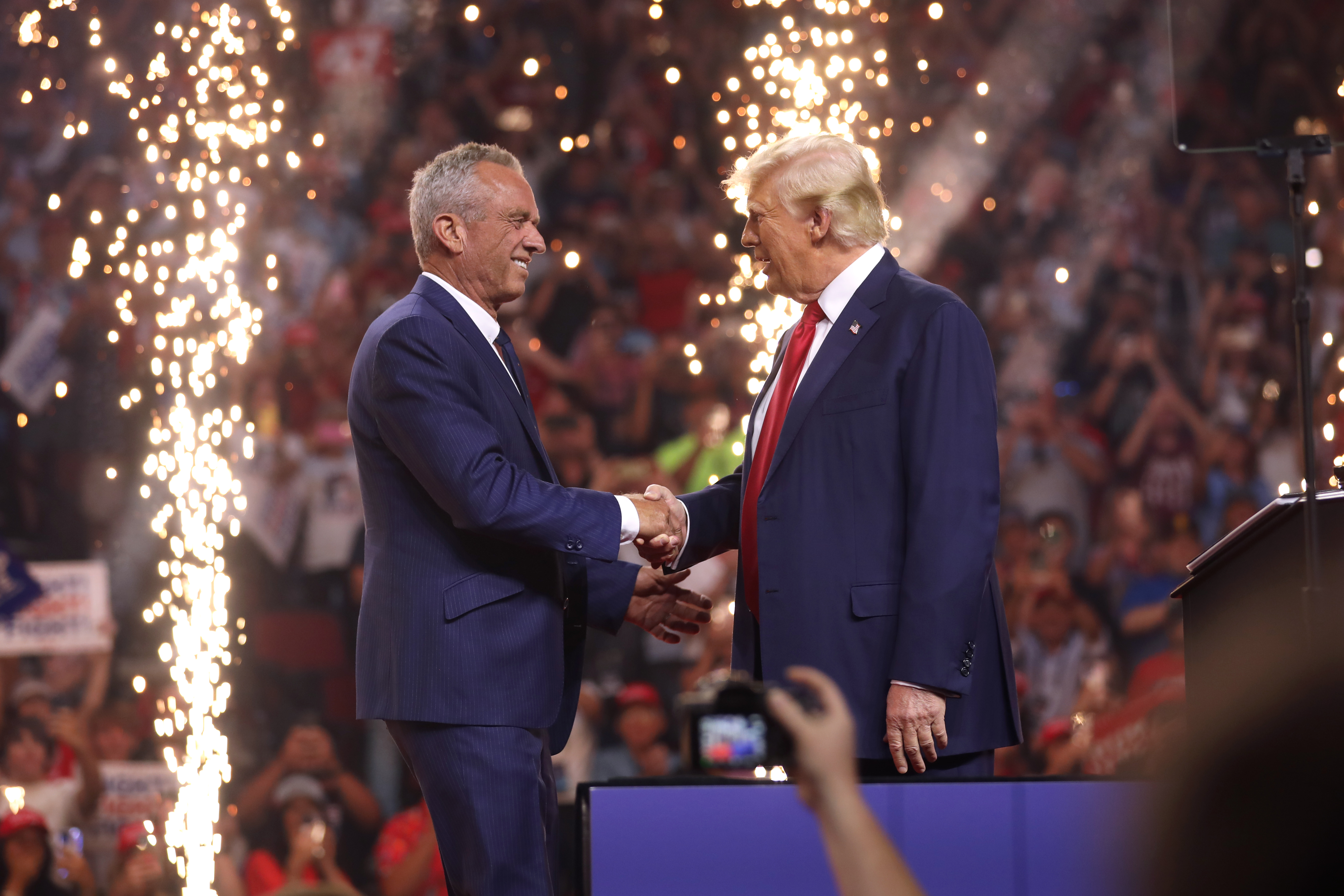
Kennedy shaking hands with Trump after endorsing him in August 2024

On August 20, 2024, Shanahan accused the Democratic Party of sabotaging their campaign and suggested that the Kennedy campaign would endorse Trump during a podcast interview, stating they could either stay in the race but that "we run the risk of a Kamala Harris and Walz presidency, as we draw votes from Trump — we draw somehow more votes from Trump. Or we walk away, right now, and join forces with Donald Trump, and we walk away from that and explain to our base why we are making this decision. Not easy." Shanahan further stated that they were not in talks with Harris, but were compelled to pursue some sort of alliance and suggested they were in contact with the Trump team about a second Trump term. One possible position for Kennedy in a Trump cabinet has been the Secretary of Health and Human Services.

The next day, the Kennedy campaign announced that it would hold a press conference in Phoenix on August 23 detailing the future of the campaign. Sources also told ABC News that Kennedy is considering dropping out by the end of the week and endorsing Trump, with hopes to blunt the 2024 Democratic National Convention momentum. On August 23, Kennedy held a press conference in Phoenix, Arizona, where he announced he would suspend his campaign and endorse Trump. Kennedy said he was "suspending" and "not ending" his campaign, and encouraged his supporters to still vote for him in solidly blue and red states. He hinted at a contingent election scenario in which no one gets 270 electoral votes and he could still win. That night, he spoke at a Trump rally in Glendale and appeared onstage with him.

On August 27, Kennedy was named to Trump's transition team. Kennedy has made frequent campaign appearances in support of Trump, often alongside Tulsi Gabbard. In a September fundraising email, Kennedy asked his supporters to vote for Trump no matter where they lived, while his campaign continued in blue states.

== Ballot access ==
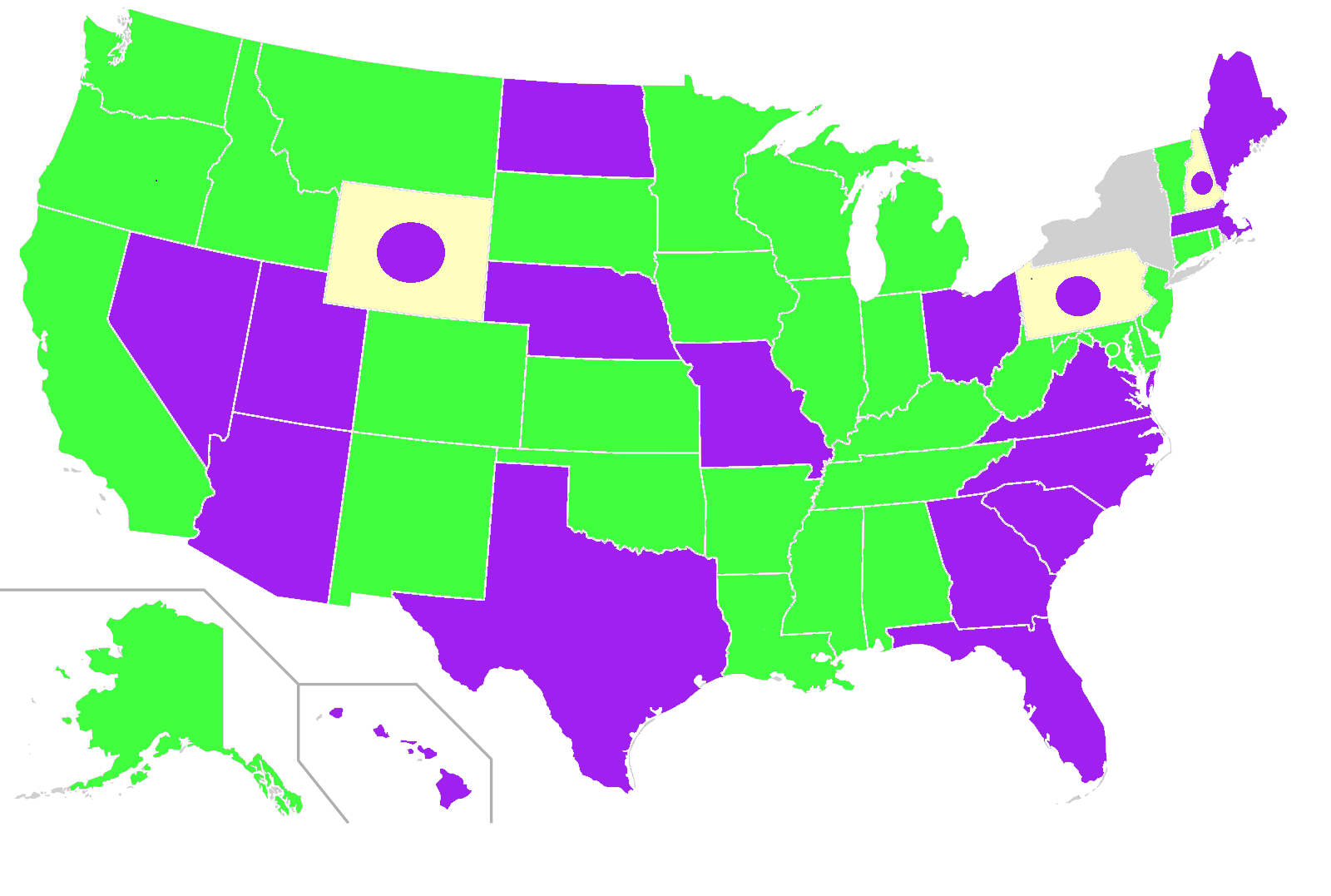
Kennedy Jr. ballot access for the 2024 presidential election, as of August 2024: Certified for ballot (30 states + D.C., 283 electors) (Note: Kennedy on the ballot in: Alabama (9); Alaska (3); Arkansas (6); California (54, as American Independent); Colorado (10); Connecticut (7); Delaware (3, as Independent Party of Delaware); District of Columbia (3); Idaho (4); Illinois (19); Indiana (11, as We The People); Iowa (6, as We The People); Kansas (6); Kentucky (8); Louisiana (8, as We The People); Maryland (10); Michigan (15, as Natural Law Party); Minnesota (10, as We The People); Mississippi (6); Montana (4); New Jersey (14); New Mexico (5); Oklahoma (7); Oregon (8, as We The People); Rhode Island (4, as Team Kennedy); South Dakota (3); Tennessee (11); Vermont (3, as We The People); Washington (12, as We The People); West Virginia (4); Wisconsin (10, as We The People)) Automatic write-in (Three states, 26 electors) (Note: Kennedy write-in states: New Hampshire (4); Pennsylvania (19, as We The People); Wyoming (3)) Not on ballot Removed name from ballot (19 states, 227 electors) (Note: Kennedy withdraws from ballot in: Arizona (11); Florida (30, as Reform Party); Georgia (16); Hawaii (4, as We The People); Maine (4); Massachusetts (11, as We The People); Missouri (10); Nebraska (5); Nevada (6); New Hampshire (4); North Carolina (16, as We The People); North Dakota (3); Ohio (17); Pennsylvania (19, as We The People); South Carolina (9, as Alliance Party); Texas (40); Utah (6); Virginia (13); Wyoming (3))

The Kennedy campaign indicated in late December 2023 that it would focus its ballot access efforts in "Arizona, California, Georgia, Illinois, Michigan, New York and Texas." On December 27, 2023, the Kennedy campaign announced it had achieved ballot access for the first time in Utah, which was confirmed the following day by the Salt Lake County clerk's office. To help with achieving ballot access, Kennedy filed paperwork to establish state political parties: the Texas Independent Party in Texas, and We the People Parties in California, Delaware, Hawaii, Mississippi, and North Carolina. This was to take advantage of lower signature thresholds to attain ballot access, as fully independent candidates generally need more signatures to make the ballot. On January 23, 2024, the campaign announced that Kennedy had collected the requisite number of signatures to qualify for the ballot in New Hampshire. The Kennedy campaign claimed on June 10 that they obtained access to enough ballots to exceed the 270 electoral votes needed to win the presidency, though the claim has not yet been independently verified. Many of those states have not yet "certified" the provided signatures. As of June 19, 2024, officials in Mississippi had not received all the required documents to certify a We the People party in that state; the remainder needed to be filed by September 6.

On August 9, 2024, the campaign announced that they submitted 19,000 signatures to put Kennedy on the ballot in the District of Columbia.

On August 12, 2024, Kennedy was denied ballot access in New York.

=== Nominations by minor parties ===
Multiple minor parties have nominated Kennedy as their candidate, giving him ballot access in several states.

On April 18, 2024, the campaign announced that Kennedy would appear on the ballot in Michigan as the nominee of the Natural Law Party. This was confirmed by a Michigan Secretary of State's office spokesperson.

On April 29, the campaign announced that Kennedy would appear on the ballot in his home state of California as the nominee of the American Independent Party.

On May 7, the campaign announced that Kennedy would appear on ballots in Delaware as the nominee of the Independent Party of Delaware.

On May 23, Kennedy was nominated as the candidate of the Reform Party of the United States of America; the party filed for ballot access in Florida, which was granted on June 5.

On May 31, the campaign announced that Kennedy would appear on ballots in South Carolina as the nominee of the Alliance Party of South Carolina.

On July 2, the Libertarian Party of Colorado announced plans to place Kennedy and Shanahan on their ballot line, rather than Chase Oliver and Mike ter Maat, who were nominated as the Libertarian presidential ticket at their national convention. However, the secretary of the national party filed paperwork with the Colorado Secretary of State which named Oliver and ter Maat as the party's candidates to appear on Colorado's ballot, which the state accepted as final. The party ended its attempt to list Kennedy on its ballot line after he announced his endorsement of Trump.

Kennedy was rebuffed by the Unity Party of Colorado for their nomination, according to the Colorado state party chair.

=== Unsuccessful attempt at Libertarian candidacy ===
On several occasions throughout his campaign, Kennedy openly flirted with the idea of seeking the presidential nomination of the Libertarian Party. The nomination would have secured him ballot access in no fewer than 35 states.

In February 2024, Kennedy delivered a speech at the Libertarian Party of California Convention, where he also participated in a forum with two Libertarian presidential candidates. He received one vote of 95 cast in a straw poll taken among the convention's attendees.

The following month, chair of the Libertarian Party Angela McArdle confirmed that she was in talks with Kennedy. On April 13, Kennedy said that he would not run as a Libertarian, because he did not foresee further issues with ballot access.

Despite announcing he would not run as a Libertarian, Kennedy spoke at the 2024 Libertarian National Convention and was an official candidate. He was eliminated in the first round of voting, receiving support from 19 delegates, 2% of the delegate vote.

=== Nevada litigation ===
The Nevada Secretary of State's office informed the Kennedy campaign that its petition to gain ballot access did not require naming a running mate. The office subsequently also approved the Kennedy petition, which did not name a running mate. After the Kennedy campaign collected over 15,000 signatures to obtain ballot access, the Nevada Secretary of State stated that it had misinformed the Kennedy campaign and that the petition it had previously approved did require naming a running mate, potentially invalidating the signatures already collected. Kennedy threatened legal action and accused the Nevada Secretary of State of colluding with the Democratic National Committee to block his ballot access, which it denied.

=== New York litigation ===
In June 2024, two citizens backed by the Democratic National Committee sued to keep Kennedy off the ballot, alleging that his signatures were collected by fraud.

Clear Choice Action, a Democratic-affiliated group, also challenged Kennedy's ballot access in New York, arguing that his representation as a New York resident on campaign filings was false. On August 12, 2024, a judge found in their favor, removing Kennedy from the ballot in the state. The ruling held that Kennedy was a resident of California, and his listed address in Katonah, New York (a rented room in the home of a friend) was "a 'sham' address that he assumed for the purpose of maintaining his voter registration". Kennedy's campaign appealed the ruling in August.

On September 27, 2024, the Supreme Court rejected Kennedy's appeal to appear on the New York ballot in a one-sentence order, without comment or dissent.

=== Withdrawals from state ballots ===
The night of August 22, Kennedy withdrew from the Arizona ballot. Kennedy also withdrew from the Texas ballot. His request to be removed from the Pennsylvania ballot was approved. Kennedy withdrew his name in Florida on August 23. The Alliance Party of South Carolina withdrew his nomination in that state the following week. The office of the Ohio secretary of state confirmed that Kennedy would not appear on the ballot after his campaign submitted paperwork to remove his name from the ballot. Kennedy was removed from the ballot in Maine and Nevada. He was removed from the ballot in Virginia at his request in addition to Utah. He has also removed his name from the New Hampshire and Georgia ballots.

In early September, Kennedy shifted his strategy and began to exit ballots in safe Republican states, starting with North Dakota, and called on voters in those states to vote for the Trump campaign. His campaign plans to stay on the ballot in Democratic-leaning states. Kennedy also exited the ballot in Wyoming.

In Michigan Kennedy is on the ballot as the candidate of the Natural Law Party. The party's chair, Doug Dern, told The Detroit News after Kennedy announced that he was withdrawing from the ballot that "He pretended to support third-party politics then goes running back to the two-party system." Dern further expressed that he was "feeling used and taken advantage of." On August 24, officials in the swing state of Michigan stated that it is already too late for Kennedy to remove his name from the ballot, which a Michigan judge affirmed on September 3. The Michigan Court of Appeals ordered on September 6 that Kennedy's name be removed from the ballot, which was reversed by the Michigan Supreme Court on September 9.

On August 29, the North Carolina State Board of Elections refused to take Kennedy off of the ballot in the state, saying that since the first absentee ballots had to be sent out by September 6 and 1.7 million ballots had already been printed, it was too late in the process for ballots to be altered. Kennedy filed suit in Wake County Superior Court on August 31, to force the removal of his name from the ballot, arguing that the elections board's decision violated his right to free speech and state election law. A judge denied the request, though Kennedy was given time to appeal. The North Carolina Court of Appeals issued an order in which ballots were not allowed to be sent out and Kennedy was ordered to be removed from the ballot. The North Carolina Supreme Court ruled on September 10 that Kennedy should be removed from the ballot, which could delay early voting.

Kennedy will remain on the ballot in Indiana and Maryland. The Wisconsin Elections Commission voted on August 27 to keep Kennedy on the ballot in Wisconsin. Kennedy filed a lawsuit on September 3 in response. He also filed an appeal with District II of the Wisconsin Court of Appeals on September 10. Dane County Circuit Judge Stephen Ehlke ruled on September 16 that Kennedy would appear on the ballot. The 2nd District of the Wisconsin Court of Appeals agreed on September 18 to hear Kennedy's case. The Wisconsin Supreme Court declined to remove Kennedy from the ballot. On October 29, 2024, the Supreme Court rejected Kennedy's requests to remove him from the Wisconsin and Michigan ballots.

Kennedy was removed from the ballot in Massachusetts in September 2024, as well as Nebraska.

== Controversies ==
=== Alleged Super PAC collaboration ===
American Values 2024, the Super PAC supporting Kennedy's campaign, was accused of illegally collaborating with the Kennedy campaign and violating election rules in several states. The super PAC announced plans to spend $10 million to $15 million to help Kennedy get on the ballot in key states. In January 2024 it started hiring signature-gathering vendors for this purpose. In February the Democratic National Committee filed a complaint with the Federal Election Commission alleging that the ballot access operation was illegal coordination with the Kennedy campaign. Super PACs are prohibited from coordinating with campaign organizations, and some states have specific guidelines that give only the campaigns authorization to collect the signatures. On August 20, 2024, The New York Times reported on 110,000 signatures allegedly collected by American Values PAC and presented to election officials in Arizona.

=== Antisemitic and racist remarks ===
At a speech in Washington, DC in 2021, Kennedy was alleged to have compared President Biden's COVID-19 vaccination policies to the Holocaust. It was reported in the media that Kennedy claimed Anne Frank and Jews in Nazi Germany had more freedom than American citizens amid vaccine mandates in churches and schools, and business closures. His Nazi analogy was condemned by both the Auschwitz-Birkenau State Museum and his wife, Cheryl Hines. He later apologized, while alleging that his remarks were taken out of context and that he had not been referring to COVID restriction at that point in the speech and was making a broader point about a growing surveillance state.

According to a New York Post report published in July 2023, Kennedy said at a dinner party that "COVID-19 is targeted to attack Caucasians and black people. The people who are most immune are Ashkenazi Jews and Chinese" and said that "We don't know whether it was deliberately targeted [like] that or not, but there are papers out there that show the racial and ethnic differential." Kennedy responded to the report by calling it "mistaken", said that "I have never, ever suggested that the COVID-19 virus was targeted to spare Jews", and said that he "never implied that the ethnic effect was deliberately engineered." He said that he was instead expressing his belief that the United States and other governments were developing "ethnically targeted bioweapons", citing a 2021 study on the genetic susceptibility of COVID-19 as proof that these types of bioweapons could be engineered. He contended that the dinner party was off the record, a claim that has been disputed by the event organizer.

Marianne Williamson, another candidate for the 2024 Democratic nomination who is also Jewish, condemned his comments. The Anti-Defamation League and the Stop Asian Hate Project also condemned his comments. Some members of Kennedy's family, including siblings Kerry, Rory, and Joe and nephew Joe III, took the unusual step of publicly condemning their relative. Later in July, Kennedy said that he "should've been more careful about what I said", but continued to deny allegations of racism and antisemitism, saying that "In my entire life, I have never uttered a phrase that was either racist or antisemitic. … I've fought more ferociously for Israel than anybody, and I am being censored here."

Kennedy's campaign was criticized for homophobic remarks posted by his Black voter engagement director Angela Stanton King against Black Conservative Federation founder Diante Johnson. King claimed Johnson was "an open flaming Feminine closet Gay" in an April 10 post on X, further adding "How is he gonna lead heterosexual black men to the Republican Party?" Politico reported the comments continued "a pattern of behavior from Kennedy's consultants that has drawn negative attention and forced the campaign to respond," and that it could turn off voters and donors.

=== Spoiler effect ===
In an April 5, 2024, meeting with New York Republicans, Rita Palma, the Kennedy campaign director for New York, said their top priority was to "get rid of Biden" and prevent a Biden victory by getting Republican voters to vote for Kennedy to defeat their "mutual enemy" by being a spoiler and triggering a contingent election. Plans included collecting signatures for Kennedy, volunteering with the Trump campaign in Pennsylvania, and voting for Kennedy for president. The Kennedy campaign claimed Palma was a consultant for the campaign and not involved in electoral strategy, contradicting Palma's claims of being hired by the Kennedy campaign. DNC spokesperson Matt Corridoni criticized the news, stating "RFK Jr.'s campaign isn't building a plan or a strategy to get 270 electoral votes, they're building one to help Trump return to the Oval Office." Amaryllis Fox said on April 10 that the campaign had dismissed Palma.

On Truth Social, Donald Trump called Kennedy a radical left Democrat, and "the most radical left candidate in the race," criticizing Kennedy for his running mate, economic policies, and support of the Green New Deal. Trump simultaneously stated that Kennedy's campaign was "great for MAGA" because he believed that Kennedy would take more votes away from Biden than himself. In a later post, Trump again denounced Kennedy as a "Democrat plant" and urged his followers not to vote for Kennedy because "a Vote for Junior' would essentially be a wasted protest vote."

In response to accusations that he would act as a spoiler in the race Kennedy announced a policy dubbed his "non-spoiler pledge." In the policy he invited both the Biden campaign and the Trump campaign to jointly fund a set of polls in October, putting each candidate head to head against each other in two person races. The "pledge" was that whoever fared worse against their opponent in the poll drop out of the race. The invite was not accepted or recognized by either candidate.

== Political positions ==
=== Abortion and fertility medicine ===
Kennedy told Reuters that abortions are a "tragedy" but abortion should be a person's right "throughout the pregnancy".

Speaking to reporters at the Iowa State Fair in August 2023, Kennedy expressed support for a national ban on abortion after the first three months. He elaborated further, "Once a child is viable, outside the womb, I think then the state has an interest in protecting the child". A spokesman from his campaign later released a statement saying that Kennedy had misunderstood the question because it had been asked in a noisy and crowded exhibition hall, saying that the candidate "does not support legislation banning abortion" and is always in favor of a person's right to choose.

Running mate Nicole Shanahan has been a vocal opponent of in vitro fertilization, calling it "one of the biggest lies that's being told about women's health today." She has instead advocated for women interested in having children to increase their exposure to sunlight, among other unconventional methods.

=== Democracy ===
Speaking on Erin Burnett OutFront, Kennedy said that President Biden poses a bigger threat to democracy than Donald Trump, alleging that he was the first ever president to use federal agencies to censor free speech. He also expressed concern with Trump's attempts to overturn the 2020 United States presidential election, but downplayed their severity. He added that election deniers had valid concerns and should not have been demonized. Democratic National Committee advisor Mary Beth Cahill strongly rebuked Kennedy's remarks, while conservative evangelist Franklin Graham praised Kennedy for being "100% correct."

A campaign fundraising email sent in April 2024 said that Edward Snowden, Julian Assange and the January 6 rioters were political activists who had been wrongly "stripped of their Constitutional liberties." The email incorrectly identified Assange as an American citizen (he is an Australian citizen). As for defending the January 6 rioters, the Kennedy campaign blamed the marketing firm that handles their email communications. Shortly after the marketing email was sent out and during a statement to clarify his position on the Capitol attack, Kennedy said he would appoint a special prosecutor to determine if those charged were politically prosecuted, questioned whether the riot qualified as an insurrection, and stated he was "disturbed by the weaponization of government" against Trump. Following Trump's conviction of 34 felonies by a jury in his New York hush money case, Kennedy, agreeing with the Republican stance, called the verdict "profoundly undemocratic" and attacked Democrats by claiming that the prosecution was politically motivated.

=== Economy ===
At the start of his campaign, Kennedy said that his priority would be "to end the corrupt merger of state and corporate power that is threatening now to impose a new kind of corporate feudalism in our country." He was strongly critical of the contemporary political economy of the United States, describing it as a "cushy socialism for the rich and this kind of brutal, merciless capitalism for the poor".

Kennedy has proposed to enact policies that favor "small and medium businesses" and break up "too-big-to-fail" banks and monopolies: "When crisis strikes, bail out the homeowners, debtors, and small business owners instead."

In an interview with The Hill's Rising program, Kennedy expressed support for "giving some kind of massive debt forgiveness" for student loans in order to "unleash" creative energies and "rebuild the country."

=== Environment ===
Kennedy vowed to repeal segments of President Biden's climate initiatives in the Inflation Reduction Act, including the bill's carbon capture and storage initiatives and the issuance of clean energy subsidies.

Kennedy opposes nuclear power as a clean energy source. In a 2023 interview with Elon Musk, Kennedy called himself a "free-market absolutist" in regard to the construction of clean power generation, saying "I believe that we should take the cheapest form of energy, that we should have no subsidies, no externalities, and all the companies should internalize their costs in the way that they internalize their profits. And that means the cost of pollution."

In a June 2023 speech to the Ethan Allen Institute, Kennedy proposed a plan to expand the nation's electric grid, and ensure "free energy forever," by offering incentive to state governments to reform a regulatory system, which he said is governed by "byzantine rules".

=== Foreign policy ===
Kennedy has said he wants to "end the proxy wars, bombing campaigns, covert operations, coups, paramilitaries, and everything else that has become so normal most people don't know what's happening." He says that "the Democratic Party became the party of war," and said "I attribute that directly to President Biden."

In June 2023, Kennedy stated in an interview that on broad terms he believes that U.S. foreign relations should involve significantly reducing the military presence in other nations. He specifically said the country must "start unraveling the Empire" through closing U.S. bases in different locations worldwide.

==== China ====
During an appearance on Newsmax TV in June 2023, Kennedy claimed without citing any evidence that the United States and China are engaged in an arms race to develop what he described as "ethnic bioweapons" designed to attack and harm people of a specific race. He also claimed without evidence that, despite the U.S. being a signatory to the Biological Weapons Convention, the Central Intelligence Agency has continued to undertake banned bioweapons research in secret.

In 2024, Kennedy told Politico he would abandon "provocative policies" pursued by the Biden and Trump administrations, saying "China does not want a hot war … [Kennedy] will negotiate sensible and verifiable arms reduction treaties starting with matters of urgent mutual interest such as reducing the risks of bioweapons and AI weapons." He promised to "shift the competition to the economic realm", while also avoiding decoupling. He said he wanted to end the US "making enemies throughout the world by projecting military power even as China makes friends through its economic power". In regards to Taiwan, he would reassure China the US "will never attempt to use Taiwan as a pawn to weaken China", which would lead China and Taiwan to "peacefully coexist and come to mutually satisfactory political arrangements".

==== Israel and Gaza ====
On December 18, 2023, in a Breaking Points interview with Krystal Ball regarding the Gaza humanitarian crisis, Kennedy criticized the Palestinian people, calling them "arguably the most pampered people by international aid organizations in the history of the world," referring to the disproportionate level or humanitarian aid the region receives and compared the conflict to a hypothetical scenario where "if Mexico attacked us and we built a fence, would you blame us for caging in Mexico?" His support for Israel earned praise from rabbi and author Shmuley Boteach, as well as from hedge fund manager Bill Ackman.

During a January 26, 2024, interview on WABC (AM), Kennedy stated that he was "not a fan of the Netanyahu government," but defended Israel's response to the October 7 attacks. He claimed to have "a long history of support for Palestinians" and that he is "anti-Hamas".

Kennedy has called Israel a "moral nation" that was justly responding to Hamas provocations with its attacks on Gaza, and he is against the potential six-weeks ceasefire agreement backed by President Joe Biden, calling it an excuse for Hamas to rearm and rebuild itself.

==== Ukraine and Russia ====
Kennedy argues that there were agreements between United States and Russian (or Soviet) leaders emphasized that NATO would not expand eastwards, and the illegal invasion of Ukraine occurred because Russian security concerns were ignored by the United States. He has described Russia's conduct with regard to the Minsk Agreements as "acting in good faith." His son, Conor, fought in the conflict as a member of the Ukrainian International Legion.

Kennedy has blamed the war on alleged U.S. engineering of the 2014 Revolution of Dignity; wrongfully stating the war has cost the U.S. $8 trillion, blamed Ukrainian President Zelensky for "provoking" Russia, claimed Ukraine had allowed the U.S. to place nuclear-capable Aegis missile launchers along Ukraine's 1,200-mile border with Russia, and pushed the Ukraine bioweapons conspiracy theory.

Kennedy believes that the administration of President Joe Biden in large part caused the 2022 invasion of Ukraine by Russia due to reckless and militant action; he has specifically cited the issue of NATO expansion into Eastern Europe. At the same time, he has clarified that he refuses to connect this criticism with anything considered support of the government of Russia under Putin, particularly given Kennedy's opposition to the regime's beliefs and politics. He has remarked that "Putin is a monster" and also labeled the leader "a thug" as well as "a gangster".

=== Gun rights and school shootings ===
Kennedy has stated "I'm not going to take people's guns away and I believe in gun control myself." He has explained his position by saying "I'm a constitutional absolutist. We can argue about whether the Second Amendment was intended to protect guns. That argument has now been settled by the Supreme Court." However, Kennedy has also stated that he would sign a bill banning assault weapons if it passed Congress.

Kennedy has strongly suggested that antidepressants and other psychiatric drugs are to blame for school shootings. He has contended that "there's a tremendous circumstantial evidence SSRIs and benzos and other drugs are doing this." At the same time he acknowledged that there is no data to support this claim, and promised to research the subject himself. He said however that "prior to the introduction of Prozac, we had almost none of these events in our country." Experts say that there is no evidence for a connection between psychiatric drugs and school shootings and point out that only a minority of school shooters were prescribed drugs.

=== Healthcare coverage ===
In contrast to a Medicare for All system favored by many Democratic politicians, Kennedy has stated that his "highest ambition would be to have a single-payer program ... where people who want to have private programs can go ahead and do that but to have a single program that is available to everybody." He has also conceded that such a system would probably be "politically unrealistic." He also opposes the prospect of nationalizing the pharmaceutical industry or providing a public option for pharmaceuticals, and instead emphasizes the need to prevent regulatory capture.

Kennedy has said he wants to make existing services available to all, including "alternative and holistic therapies that have been marginalized in a pharma-dominated system."

=== Immigration ===
Kennedy has criticized the Biden administration's immigration policies, particularly regarding the management of the Mexico–United States border. He has called for stronger enforcement of immigration laws at the border, and the prevention of "noncitizen criminals" from crossing into the United States. In January 2024, Kennedy vocalized his support for Texas governor Greg Abbott in his ongoing dispute with the federal government over jurisdiction to handle immigration issues in Texas.

=== Law enforcement ===
Kennedy has vowed to "transform the police." He is in favor of training police officers in de-escalation tactics, mediation skills, and said, "We will incentivize them to prevent violence, not make unnecessary arrests." Additionally, he announced that he would appoint an attorney general who is tough on alleged police misconduct and hate crimes.

=== LGBT issues ===
Kennedy has long supported the legalization of gay marriage. He has stated that transgender people deserve respect, that he is opposed to "mean-spirited" legislation and that he supports peoples' "gender choices". However, he is against transgender women participating in women's sports, and has supported the LGBT chemicals conspiracy theory.

In a book review of The Real Anthony Fauci, psychiatrist Theodore Dalrymple observes that Kennedy often dismisses the widespread scientific consensus that HIV causes AIDS. Kennedy continues to repeat long-debunked theories that the disease is caused by a "gay lifestyle" and the use of poppers and injectable drugs.

=== Donald Trump ===
Kennedy opposed the decision of the Colorado Supreme Court to disqualify former President Donald Trump from the ballot in the state Republican primary, arguing that the move deprived voters of their right to choose.

=== Vaccination and COVID-19 ===
Kennedy is active in the anti-vaccine movement and has espoused the pseudoscientific claim that vaccines cause autism, contrary to the overwhelming scientific consensus that vaccines are safe and effective. He is the founder and chairman of the anti-vaccine disinformation organization Children's Health Defense, which is known for promoting conspiracy theories and quackery. He has previously aligned himself with the studies of Mark Geier, a former physician whose license was revoked for administering chemical castration medications to autism spectrum disorder patients.

Kennedy is opposed to mask mandates, and compared the face mask requirements during the COVID-19 pandemic to Nazi medical experimentation on Jews in concentration camps. Kennedy criticized former President Trump's response to the pandemic, blaming Trump for travel restrictions, mask mandates, and closing down churches.

During the COVID-19 pandemic, he promoted the debunked claim that hydroxychloroquine and ivermectin were effective treatments for the virus, and multiple conspiracy theories related to COVID including false claims that both Anthony Fauci and the Bill & Melinda Gates Foundation were trying to profit off a vaccine, and suggesting that Bill Gates would cut off access to money of people who do not get vaccinated, allowing them to starve.

His campaign released a 30-minute advertisement, narrated by actor Woody Harrelson. The advertisement made misleading claims about vaccine safety and falsely implied a relationship between vaccines and autism, according to FactCheck.org.

== Public reception ==
Listing many conspiracy theories that Kennedy frequently invoked during campaign appearances, PolitiFact selected Kennedy's presidential campaign as its 2023 "lie of the year."

By July 2024 Kennedy was polling at consistently below 10%. Time reported in May 2023 that individuals who favor Kennedy span political lines: "A YouGov poll found RFK Jr. enjoying a 48% favorability rating overall and 49% among Republicans; it doesn't stretch the imagination to assume the Kennedy brand and nostalgia are doing a lot of the work there [whereas] Biden stands at 47% in that poll overall but lagging with anemic 16% favorability among Republicans." A later poll conducted by YouGov between June 10 and 13, 2023 among 1,500 U.S. citizens, and released by The Economist showed that Kennedy was viewed favorably by 49 percent of respondents, giving him the highest net favorability rating of plus 19 percent, meaning that he was viewed unfavorably by 30 percent. In comparison, President Biden and former President Trump each had the second-highest percentage of respondents viewing them favorably, with 44 percent saying so. Biden had a minus 9 percent net favorability rating, while Trump had a minus 10 percent net favorability rating.

In a Harvard Center for American Political Studies-Harris poll conducted between November 15 to 16, 2023 with 2,851 participants, Kennedy held the most positive approval of all the present day public political figures it asked about, with 52 percent of respondents viewing him favorably, whereas only 27 percent held an unfavorable opinion. This gave Kennedy a net favorability rating of plus 25 percent, compared to Joe Biden at minus 2 percent and Trump at plus 7 percent.

Although third party and independent candidates rarely perform as strongly in elections as they do in polling, a Quinnipiac University Polling Institute survey among Kennedy, Biden, and Trump released on November 1, 2023, indicated that Kennedy would win 22 percent of the vote if the 2024 presidential election were held then, including a plurality of independents.

In an opinion poll conducted by the Siena College Research Institute, and released on November 7, 2023, in six battleground states, Kennedy gained 24% of the total vote, compared to Biden at 33%, and Trump at 35%. Among voters under 45 in those six states, Kennedy polled at 32%, ahead of Biden at 30% and Trump at 29%. 18% of Democrats, and 16% of Republicans said that they would back Kennedy. However, 39% of independents said that they would back Kennedy, compared to 28% for Biden and 25% for Trump.

A FiveThirtyEight analysis of past presidential elections found that third party support tends to decline the closer it is to a presidential election.

As of April 12, 2024, a time-weighted average of 116 opinion polls gave Kennedy 8.1% of the vote, to Donald Trump's 42.1% and Biden's 40.6%.

=== Opposition from the Kennedy family ===
The reaction to Kennedy's campaign from his extended family has been largely negative. His sister Kerry Kennedy told Business Insider, "I love my brother Bobby, but I do not share or endorse his opinions on many issues, including the COVID pandemic, vaccinations and the role of social media platforms in policing false information."

Several family members also opposed his candidacy due to his anti-vaccine views, and had publicly announced their support for Joe Biden's reelection bid. Biden was endorsed by Caroline Kennedy, Joe Kennedy III, and Victoria Reggie Kennedy (all of whom served in his administration as U.S. ambassadors). Caroline's son, Jack Schlossberg, called Kennedy's campaign an "embarrassment" and a "vanity project". Other family members, such as Patrick J. Kennedy and Rory Kennedy, also endorsed Biden.

On St. Patrick's Day 2024, Biden took a group photograph together with 32 members of the Kennedy family who all supported Biden's candidacy. Four of Kennedy's siblings wrote a letter together which read "The decision of our brother Bobby to run as a third-party candidate against Joe Biden is dangerous to our country...Bobby might share the same name as our father, but he does not share the same values, vision or judgment...We denounce his candidacy and believe it to be perilous for our country." His cousin, Stephen Kennedy Smith, also stated "This is a mistake we can not afford as a country...when RFK Jr. decided to run he didn't call me to ask for help because he knew I would oppose his candidacy due to his misguided stands on issues, his poor judgement, and tenuous relationship with the truth." DNC spokesperson Matt Corridoni said that "It's telling that the people who know RFK Jr. best are standing with Joe Biden in this election."

=== Opposition from former environmental colleagues ===
In full-page advertisements sponsored by the group's political arm, Kennedy's former colleagues at the Natural Resources Defense Council, including four NRDC former presidents, called his campaign a "vanity candidacy" that is "only about spreading misinformation and growing his brand. He can't win." They urged him to drop out for the sake of the environment.

=== Support from Republicans ===
Kennedy's campaign has been noted for having drawn significant support from Republican donors and Trump allies who believe he will draw enough votes to serve as a spoiler for Biden. Kennedy's campaign has received significantly more money from donors who previously supported Trump than Biden. On April 10, 2024, The New York Times reported that Timothy Mellon was the largest single donor to Kennedy's super PAC, giving $20 million over the past year and $15 million to Trump's super PAC MAGA Inc.

In April 2023, CBS News reported that former Donald Trump advisor Steve Bannon "had been encouraging Kennedy to run for months", believing he could serve as a "useful chaos agent" and promote opposition to vaccines. Kennedy has denied any involvement with Bannon and referred to the allegation as a "baseless lie". Other right-wing personalities who have encouraged his campaign include Mike Flynn, Alex Jones, and Roger Stone, some of which have speculated that he could become Trump's running mate in the 2024 campaign as part of a unity ticket if he loses the Democratic primary. Since embarking on an independent campaign, Kennedy has adamantly denied this prospect.

Former Ronald Reagan and George H. W. Bush speechwriter Douglas MacKinnon wrote in a May 2023 opinion piece in The Hill that he believed Kennedy would ultimately be the 2024 Democratic nominee, asserting that he was "still not convinced President Joe Biden will actually run for reelection". (Note: Biden formally announced his reelection bid a month before MacKinnon's piece was published.) Other conservative commentators such as Eric Bolling, Charlie Kirk, and Greta Van Susteren have also praised his campaign. After Tucker Carlson was fired from Fox News, Kennedy defended him as "breathtakingly courageous" and blamed his termination on the pharmaceutical industry, believing it was in retaliation for an episode of Tucker Carlson Tonight where he had lauded Kennedy's stance on vaccines. In return, Carlson asserted that "There's never been a candidate for president the media hated more than Robert F. Kennedy Jr." and said that Kennedy is "winning".

=== Endorsements ===
Kennedy appeared on the All-In Podcast, hosted by venture capitalists Chamath Palihapitiya, Jason Calacanis, David Friedberg, and David O. Sacks. Sacks later co-endorsed Kennedy and Republican Ron DeSantis. A report by Axios found that the Kennedy and DeSantis campaigns shared many of the same wealthy Wall Street donors. DeSantis himself has suggested that as president, he would consider appointing Kennedy to lead either the Centers for Disease Control or the Food and Drug Administration.

Campaign endorsements as an independent

Local officials

- Jamel Holley, former member of the New Jersey General Assembly from the 20th district (2015–2022) (Democrat)

Notable individuals

- Dicky Barrett, singer
- Russell Brand, British actor
- Jay Carson, former press secretary for Hillary Clinton, creator of The Morning Show
- Eric Clapton, British guitarist, singer and songwriter
- Cheryl Hines, actress and comedian (candidate's wife)
- Zachary Levi, actor
- Woody Harrelson, actor, director, and activist
- M.I.A., British rapper and singer
- Jenny McCarthy, actress, model, and television personality
- Aaron Rodgers, NFL quarterback
- Ken Ruettgers, former NFL offensive tackle
- Beanie Sigel, rapper
- Alicia Silverstone, actress
- Kevin Spacey, actor
- John Stockton, former professional basketball player
- Donnie Wahlberg, singer, songwriter, actor, and producer

Political parties

- Alliance Party of South Carolina
- American Independent Party
- Libertarian Party of Colorado
- Reform Party
- Independent Party of Delaware
- Natural Law Party
Campaign endorsements as a Democrat

Local officials

- James F. Gennaro, New York City Councilman from District 24 (2002–2013; 2021–present)

Notable individuals

- Dicky Barrett, singer
- Jack Dorsey, co-founder and former CEO of Twitter
- David Sacks, co-founder of Craft Ventures and former COO of PayPal (co-endorsed with Ron DeSantis)
- Rob Schneider, comedian and actor
- Alicia Silverstone, actress (Independent)

=== Results ===
Kennedy received 756,393 total votes and 0.48% of the national vote. Kennedy's 1.96% in Montana was the highest statewide vote share of any third-party candidate. Kennedy also received over one percent of the vote in Alaska, Arkansas, California, Colorado, Idaho, Illinois, Indiana, Kansas, New Mexico, Oklahoma, Oregon, South Dakota, Vermont, Washington, and West Virginia.

Kennedy's best town by percentage was Brighton, Vermont where he received 12.77% of the vote.
