= Kevin Jenkins =

Kevin Jenkins may refer to:

- Kevin Jenkins (conspiracy theorist)
- Kevin Jenkins (politician)
