= Tony Muhammad =

American minister and anti-vaccination activist

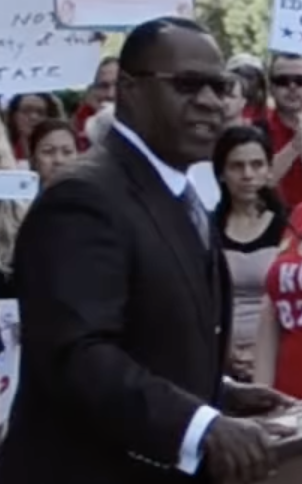
- Other name: Abdul Malik Sayyid Muhammad
- Occupation: Nation of Islam Minister
- Years active: 1995–present

Tony Muhammad, also known as Abdul Malik Sayyid Muhammad, is an American minister and anti-vaccination activist. He is the regional representative for the Nation of Islam on the West Coast, as well as a Scientologist.

== Biography ==
Muhammad described his youth with his nine siblings as difficult, with a mostly absent father and a mother struggling with alcohol addiction. He was an athlete in college, playing football and baseball.

Before becoming a Nation of Islam minister, he worked as the real estate executive of a fast-food chain and was an Eastern Air Lines manager in Atlanta. A former drug dealer, the Eastern Airlines job allowed him to get past airport security with shipments of cocaine.

== Nation of Islam ==
Muhammad joined Nation of Islam in 1985. As minister in the South before being chosen by Farrakhan to hold the position of Western regional Minister in 1995, leaving Atlanta with his family to California. He eventually took on the name of Abdul Malik Sayyid Muhammad. Counting only a thousand members when Muhammad arrived, he says he built the Nation of Islam in Los Angeles congregation back to 3,000 members, which was its record high.

His term got off to a rocky start, his congregation being forcibly evicted from the building they occupied in 1996, for failing to fulfill the conditions of their lease-to-buy contract. Muhammad was rebuked by other Muslim leaders for predicting California would be hit by a major earthquake as retaliation for the eviction. Muslims do not generally believe that God reveals the future to the faithful.

Muhammad was credited for bringing a more collaborative style to the organization in Los Angeles, favoring dialogue between the community and police forces. His efforts at bridge-building were recognized by the region's police chiefs, who acknowledge his conflict resolution skills. Muhammad denounced both police brutality and gang violence, using the Nation of Islam's influence to try to quell street violence. Non-violence advocates recognized his role in making communities safer. Since 2012, Muhammad and Reverend Alfreddie Johnson host Peace Rides to promote non-violence in Los Angeles County, such as in Compton.

In 2005, Muhammad was injured during a scuffle with officers from the Los Angeles Police Department. The officers were surrounded by a group that included Muhammad and gang members when they approached to ask that double-parked SUVs be moved during a vigil for a victim of gang violence. In the scuffle that ensued, an officer was pushed to the ground, another used pepper spray and Muhammad ended up being handcuffed and received bruises on his face, either from a fall or being hit by the officers. Two of Muhammad's bodyguards were arrested on suspicion of obstruction of justice. The altercation provoked protests against the LAPD. LAPD Chief William Bratton requested that Muhammad and his bodyguards be charged with a battery misdemeanor, but the City Attorney did not lay charges.

== Scientology ==
In 2005, Muhammad got Nation of Islam leader Louis Farrakhan interested in Scientology, saying Scientology helped him recover from the psychological shock of his police arrest. Farrakhan has since then organized mass Scientology seminars for Nation of Islam members.

Muhammad has been appearing in Scientology promotional videos and in 2017, received an International Association of Scientologists Freedom Medal award. He was a guest of honor at the opening of the first Church of Scientology in Ireland in 2017. After more than a decade as a scientologist, Muhammad went clear in 2020, attaining a high status within the organization. Reverend Alfreddie Johnson, with whom Muhammad holds joint events, is also a Scientologist.

== Anti-vaccination ==
Starting in 2015, Muhammad made opposition to vaccination for the African American community a focus of his activism. Drawing on parallels from the Bible, Muhammad has been preaching that pharmaceutical companies and the United States Government are using vaccines to specifically harm African American and Latin male children. Muhammad credits a meeting with anti-vaccination activist Robert F. Kennedy Jr. for his ideas on the dangers of vaccination.

With Kennedy's anti-vaccination group Children's Health Defense, Centner Productions, Kevin Jenkins and Curtis Cost, Muhammad is listed as one of the co-producers of the video Medical Racism: The New Apartheid, a 2021 video production promoting conspiracy theories about COVID-19 vaccines. The March 2021 hour-long video elaborates on Muhammad's conspiracy theories, claiming that the United States government seeks to harm ethnic minorities with COVID vaccines, along with rehashed anti-vaccination stories about autism, Bill Gates and the Centers for Disease Control. Like other such conspiracy theory videos, it inserts true historical events into its narrative to make its fantastic claims appear more believable. By targeting Black Americans with messaging linking COVID-19 vaccination with the Tuskegee Syphilis Study and other instances when ethical violations have been committed against minorities as part of medical studies, the video's producers are likely to hurt the Black community by increasing vaccine hesitancy within that vulnerable population.

Meetings between Muhammad and Kennedy quickly led Nation of Islam to adopt an anti-vaccination stance in 2015. The two men co-hosted a Facebook event in September 2020, discussing the same themes that were eventually presented in the video. Muhammad was already equating vaccination with the Tuskegee Study when he campaigned alongside Kennedy against Bill 277, a California legislation restricting vaccination exemptions in the state. Several African American leaders testified on that occasion that contrary to Muhammad, they supported California's efforts to have a greater number of children vaccinated.

In 2016, Muhammad joined Andrew Wakefield and Del Bigtree for the promotion tour of the anti-vaccination Vaxxed, using the Nation of Islam to bring people to thirty screenings. Muhammad and Bigtree were still appearing at the same anti-vaccination events in 2021.
