= National Christian Foundation =

Organization

- Formation: 1982; 44 years ago
- Founders: Larry Burkett; Ron Blue; Terry Parker
- Type: Charitable giving channel
- Tax ID no.: 501(c)(3)
- Legal status: Nonprofit organization
- Headquarters: Alpharetta, Georgia
- Location: 1150 Sanctuary Pkwy, Alpharetta, GA 30009
- Coordinates: 34.063635°N 84.288454°W
- CEO: Kendra VanderMeulen
- Chair of the board: Jay Bennett
- Vice chair: Phil Drake
- Board of directors: Katherine Barnhart; Jay Bennett; Lloyd M. Bentson III; Jess Correll; Bob Doll; Phil Drake; James B. "Buck" McCabe; Terry Parker
- Affiliations: 28 NCF affiliates nationwide
- Staff: 200
- Website: www.ncfgiving.com

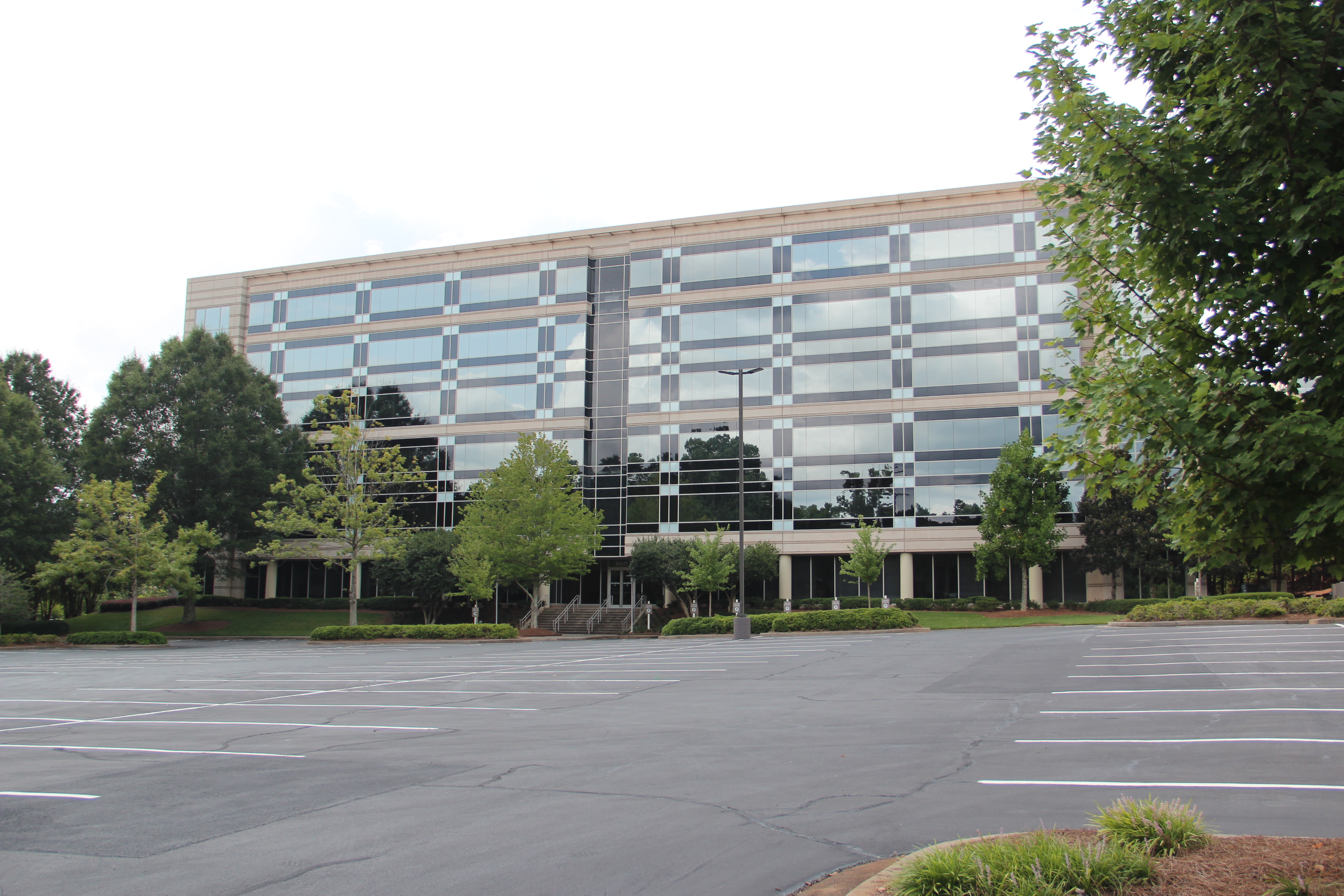
NCF headquarters in Alpharetta, Georgia

The National Christian Foundation (NCF) is a US nonprofit that assists donors in donating to charitable causes. NCF accepts noncash assets and is the nation's largest provider of Christian-centric donor-advised funds. Since 1982, NCF has granted over $14.5 billion to causes and charities.

== History ==
In 1982, Evangelical Christian author and entrepreneur Larry Burkett, financial author and advisor Ron Blue, and tax attorney Terry Parker founded the National Christian Foundation.

Headquartered in Alpharetta, Georgia, NCF began adding local offices throughout the United States in 2000. In 2018, NCF reported having 28 local offices in cities across the country, including Dallas, Orlando, Chicago, and Seattle. These local offices are community-based and act as liaisons to the national organization.

In 2021, NCF distributed its $14 billion to more than 71,000 charities since its founding. This has led it to be ranked as the 6th largest non-profit organization in the United States.

== Program ==
NCF's primary operation, the Giving Fund (donor-advised fund), works as a charitable savings account.

NCF spends a portion of donations to fund the support activities necessary to be able to make those grants. NCF calculates the amount as a percentage of the donor's Fund balance (typically 1% or less each year) and, in the case of non-cash assets, a percentage of gift value (typically 5%, one time).

== Criticism ==
According to Inside Philanthropy, there is a lack of clarity about NCF's capital sources and targets, similar to other donor-advised funds. According to a report originally published by Sludge, NCF distributed $56.1 million to 23 organizations designated as hate groups by the Southern Poverty Law Center between 2015 and 2017. The report stated that most of these organizations opposed LGBT rights; some were anti-immigrant and anti-Muslim. During the COVID-19 pandemic, NCF donated some $630,000 to Children's Health Defense, an anti-vaccine misinformation group led at the time by Robert F. Kennedy Jr..
