= Slam (magazine) =

American basketball magazine

- The first issue of Slam, featuring cover athlete Larry Johnson.
- Categories: Sports
- Frequency: Bimonthly (6 per year)
- Total circulation: 70,000 (2024)
- Founder: Dennis Page
- Founded: 1994
- Company: Slam Media Inc.
- Country: United States
- Based in: New York City
- Language: English
- Website: www.slamonline.com
- ISSN: 1072-625X

Slam (stylized in all caps) is an American basketball magazine in circulation since 1994.

== History ==
=== Founding and early years ===
Slam was launched in 1994 as a basketball magazine that combined the sport with hip hop culture at a time when the genre was becoming increasingly popular. Launching as a quarterly with an initial circulation of 125,000, it was founded by publisher Dennis Page at Harris Publications, and he hired Cory Johnson to be the first Editor in Chief.

Its first issue had a cover story on Larry Johnson of the Charlotte Hornets (written by future Fortune editor Andrew Serwer) and a feature on then-Cal freshman Jason Kidd. Many of the magazine's lasting features, such as In Your Face, Slam-a-da-month, and Last Shot, all began with that first issue.

From 1996 to 1997, Slam's total annual-unit sales rose 25 percent, with advertising revenue increasing by more than a third; by 1998, the magazine was published eight times per year.

=== Ownership ===
Slam's ownership has changed several times. Petersen Publishing bought Slam in 1998. The next year, Petersen was acquired by British publisher EMAP. In 2001, EMAP sold its U.S. division to Primedia (now Rent Group). When Primedia left the magazine business in 2007, Source Interlink acquired a majority of the company, including Slam, in August 2017. Slam was then acquired by an investment group led by Dennis Page (Founder and Publisher) and David Schnur (Executive Publisher). The new holding company is Slam Media Inc. based in New York City.

=== Advertising content ===
The magazine carries advertising for basketball-related products, street-wear clothing and hip hop music, and has been credited with helping to market hip-hop culture and basketball as one.

As of November 1997, the Philadelphia Daily News reported, roughly a third of Slam's ads were for sneakers.

=== Covers ===
Slam has published over 200 issues in its history, and has featured the biggest names in basketball on its cover, in articles, and on its famous SLAMups posters.

The first woman to appear on the Slam cover was Chamique Holdsclaw in October 1998, followed by Maya Moore for the September/October 2018 issue, and then several more WNBA stars.

LeBron James has appeared on a record 27 covers. "A Basketball On Fire" was the first Slam magazine cover without a player, in February 2012, addressing the 2011 NBA lockout.

In 2006, readers voted the cover for issue 32, featuring Allen Iverson in March 1999, as SLAM's best cover from its first hundred issues. Then-editor in chief Tony Gervino commented that the cover "defined" SLAM's hip-hop identity and added that, while covers featuring Michael Jordan sold the best, "Iverson was the heart of the magazine."

=== Distribution and circulation ===
Known for its success in the newsstand marketplace, Slam's circulation rose to 192,889 by late 1997, and then up to 201,179 in early 2000. Circulation then elevated to 227,000 by 2002 and 235,000 in 2003 (at which point it was printed nine times per year). The magazine was printed on a monthly basis as of November 2006.

The magazine is now available to international (non-U.S.) NBA fans, with special editions printed in some territories (see below), and the addition of Slam to digital stores, such as iTunes (the remoteness/distance from the U.S. of the subscriber has become a recurring theme in the letters section).

== Magazine features and editorial style ==
In 2004, Washington Post columnist Mike Wise observed that "counterculture heroes have emerged from SLAM magazine's pages." During the mid-to-late 1990s into the 2000s, SLAM was often regarded by advertising executives and media members as avant-garde for its approaches at the time of publishing player-written pieces and an extensive letters-to-the-editor section which spanned several pages, each of which provided ample voice to the NBPA and common fans. For example, in reference to Craig Hodges, author Dave Zirin reflected in the title's 100th issue that if SLAM had existed in years prior, "a player of politics and protest could've outrun purgatory. This is why SLAM is the most important print magazine of my lifetime."

- "Trash Talk": readers give their love to Slam or share some beef they had with the last magazine, and selected letters are put in this section.
- "SLAMADAMONTH": a short article describing a slam dunk accompanied by a photograph of the play. This feature usually features a dunk performed by an NBA player, but has featured college players in the past. The first SLAMADAMONTH (Spring 1994 issue) featured Chris Webber dunking on Charles Barkley.
- "NOYZ": a series of one-line jokes commenting on recent basketball events, written anonymously. The first NOYZ column appeared in the March 1995 issue.
- "In Your Face":
- "Last Shot": a former back-page column documenting a game-winning shot during a game. This feature was discontinued after the January 2000 issue.
- "SLAM Magazine's top 75 NBA players of all time"—released in 2003.
- "SLAM Magazine Old School"—Released in 2005.
- "What's My Name?": SLAM fans make nicknames for NBA players and if they win they get a prize from the slam vault.
- "The SLAM high school diary": In 1994, SLAM began a tradition of choosing a highly talented high school basketball player to keep a monthly diary recording their accomplishments as they moved toward playing college or professional basketball. Only LeBron James and Sebastian Telfair were not in their final ("senior") year of high school when they wrote the diary.
- Trash Talk: Readers' letters to the editor are posted here, with occasional comments by the editor.
- Rookie Diary – The Rookie Diary is held by a new NBA rookie yearly, as they speak about their first experiences in the league
