= Kevin Jenkins (conspiracy theorist) =

American conspiracy theorist

Kevin D. Jenkins is an American social media influencer and the CEO of Urban Global Health Alliance. He has been identified as a major promoter of misinformation about vaccines, especially targeting the African-American population.

Jenkins has been called one of the "Disinformation Dozen", twelve individuals collectively responsible for 65% of COVID-19 anti-vaccine misinformation and conspiracy theories on the internet and social media, according to a report by the Center for Countering Digital Hate (CCDH) in 2021. The CCDH report said Jenkins berated octogenarian Black civil rights leaders Hank Aaron, Billye Suber Aaron, Xernona Clayton, Louis Wade Sullivan, and Andrew Young, for participating in a COVID-19 vaccine event on January 5, 2021, to show Black Americans that the shots were safe. Jenkins posted on Facebook, "I told you all from the beginning they were going to pay off Black so-called leaders to trick you into becoming permit slaves! They are our modern-day slave catchers!!!!" The following day, Jenkins spoke on stage at the January 6th rallies and told the crowd that "Black people are being targeted with the vaccine." He was also a speaker at a large anti-vaccination rally on January 23, 2022, in Washington.

In 2021, Jenkins co-produced a video — Medical Racism: The New Apartheid that promotes conspiracy theories about COVID-19 vaccines — alongside Nation of Islam's Tony Muhammad. The film promotes "conspiratorial claims about a government-sponsored depopulation plot that targets Black people."

Jenkins is co-founder of Freedom Airway & Freedom Travel Alliance — later shortened to Freedom Travel Alliance (FTA) — a membership-based service that advertises to help people "travel around the world without observing any masking, quarantining, vaccination, or other pandemic control measures." According to The Daily Beast, none of the co-founders of the 2020 start-up have professional experience in the travel industry, though FTA spokesperson Dolores Cahill said they had plans to purchase airplanes and to "have hotlines of lawyers to help people talk their way out of restrictions".
