= Andrew Serwer =

American journalist

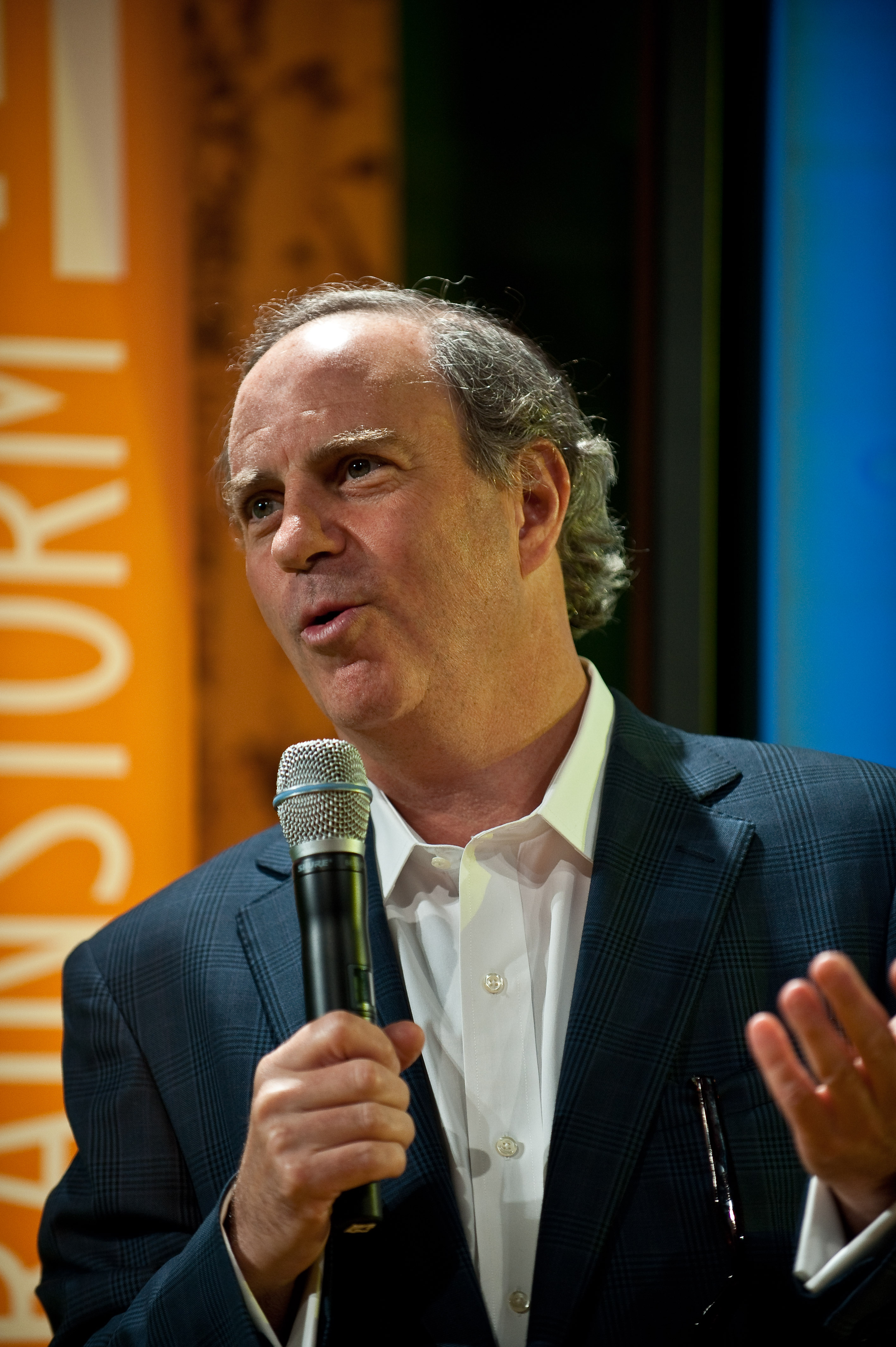
- Serwer at Fortune conference, 2011
- Born: September 16, 1959 (age 66); Chevy Chase, Maryland, U.S.
- Education: Bowdoin College
- Occupation: Journalist

Andrew Serwer (born September 16, 1959) is an American journalist and editor-at-large of Barron's, who oversaw Yahoo Finance from 2015 to 2022 as editor-in-chief, and prior to that was the top editor at Fortune. Serwer is based in Manhattan.

== Biography ==
Serwer grew up in the Washington, D.C. area and is a 1981 graduate of Bowdoin College. He joined Fortune in 1984 as a reporter and was later promoted to associate editor.

From 1995 to 1998, Serwer was a senior writer at Fortune. In 1997, he gained attention for writing an online column, then a novelty, called "Street Life" about the personalities and stories on Wall Street. "Achaea had Homer, the Spanish Civil War had Hemingway, California had the Beach Boys, and now our hyperactive stock market has its own poet-singer—Andy Serwer," James Collins wrote in the May 22, 2000, issue of The New Yorker. The column later evolved into "Captain's Blog."

He has written a number of Fortune cover stories, including profiles of Microsoft cofounder Bill Gates, Oracle cofounder Larry Ellison, and Cisco CEO John Chambers. In 2000, NewsBios named Serwer Business Journalist of the Year, calling him "perhaps the nation's top multimedia talent, successfully juggling the roles of serious journalist, astute commentator and occasional court jester."

Serwer was a regular contributor on CNN's "American Morning" and served as a co-host of CNN's "In The Money." He has also appeared on ABC's Good Morning America, NBC's The Today Show and CBS This Morning and has written for Time, Sports Illustrated, Politico, and SLAM Magazine.

Serwer was named managing editor of Fortune in November 2006, replacing Eric Pooley. In August 2014, Serwer left the company when executives appointed Alan Murray as the new top editor.

In 2015, Serwer became the editor-in-chief of Yahoo Finance, departing in December 2022. Serwer joined Barron's at the end of January 2023 as editor at large.

Serwer received the 45th Elliott V. Bell Award from the New York Financial Writers' Association in 2021.

Serwer is a member of the board of trustees of Bowdoin College.

== See also ==
- New Yorkers in journalism
