= Children's Health Defense =

American anti-vaccination activist group

- Formation: 2007; 19 years ago
- Founder: Eric Gladen
- Founded at: Washington, D.C.
- Type: Advocacy group
- Location: Franklin Lakes, New Jersey
- Chief Executive Officer: Mary Holland
- Chief Operating Officer: Kraig Makohus
- Chief Financial Officer: Doug Kissell
- Website: childrenshealthdefense.org
- Formerly called: World Mercury Project

Children's Health Defense (CHD) is an American 501(c)(3) nonprofit activist group mainly known for anti-vaccine advocacy and is one of the main sources of misinformation on vaccines. Founded as World Mercury Project in 2007 by Eric Gladen, it was chaired by lawyer Robert F. Kennedy Jr. from 2015 to 2023.

The group has campaigned against various public health programs, such as vaccination and fluoridation of drinking water. The group has contributed to vaccine hesitancy and consequent excess deaths in the United States, encouraging citizens and legislators to support anti-vaccine regulations and legislation, although arguments against vaccination are contradicted by general scientific consensus.

The group's US$15-million budget is funded through donations from individuals (both directly and anonymized through foundations) and affiliate marketing revenues.

== Background ==
The group was founded in 2007 under the name of World Mercury Project by activist Eric Gladen. Under Gladen, who produced the anti-vaccination film Trace Amounts in 2014, World Mercury Project remained a relatively minor group. It had annual revenue of $13,000 in 2014, which jumped to $470,000 in revenue in 2015, when Kennedy joined the board. In 2018 it changed its name to Children's Health Defense.

The group alleges that a large proportion of American children have conditions as diverse as autism, attention deficit hyperactivity disorder, food allergies, cancer, and autoimmune diseases due to exposure to a variety of chemicals and radiation. The chemicals and radiation that the group has blamed and campaigned against include vaccines, pesticides, fluoridation of drinking water, paracetamol (acetaminophen), aluminum, and wireless communications. It has brought lawsuits targeting pesticides in food and agriculture.

Alleging widespread corruption within health care research and collusion by multiple governments, the group endorsed a 2017 edition of the book Judy Mikovits wrote about her discredited theories, with Kennedy writing the foreword. Kennedy's book The Real Anthony Fauci, published in 2021, repeats several discredited myths about the COVID-19 pandemic, notably about the effectiveness of ivermectin. During the pandemic, the group accused the United States government of supporting research on a vaccine as part of a plan to increase revenues for the pharmaceutical industry.

The growth of the group during the pandemic gave rise to international chapters, notably in Canada, Europe and Australia.

=== Robert F. Kennedy Jr's involvement ===
Children's Health Defense is an influential anti-vaccine organization due to the prominence of its chairman, Robert F. Kennedy Jr. In April 2023, Kennedy took leave when he started his campaign as candidate for the position of President of the United States. As a non-profit group, Children's Health Defense may not endorse political candidates, but in November 2023, the group gave its first Defender Award to Kennedy for "his courage and steadfast commitment to truth and liberty".

Despite Kennedy's claims that he is not against vaccines, several critics point out he and his organization spread common anti-vaccine arguments as part of their core messages. According to David Gorski, the World Mercury project was "a group dedicated to fear mongering over mercury in vaccines as a cause of autism and health problems". Kennedy has stated the media and governments are engaged in a conspiracy to deny that vaccines cause autism. Other misinformation promoted by Children's Health Defense is a conspiracy theory in relation to the Great Reset that claims that elites, including Bill Gates, plan to take over the United States and establish a Marxist high-control regime.

Kennedy met with Donald Trump in January 2017. While Kennedy claimed the President agreed to establish a commission to study the risks allegedly associated with vaccines, government officials denied any decision was taken and nothing subsequently came of it.

On February 15, 2017, with other anti-vaccination activists and actor Robert De Niro at his side, Kennedy challenged anybody to prove the use of thimerosal is safe "in the amounts contained in vaccines currently being administered to American children and pregnant women", ignoring a 1999 Food and Drug Administration review doing just that. Although the use of thimerosal in vaccines was phased out by 2001 (with one exception), this mercury compound is still often mentioned by anti-vaccination groups. Overwhelming evidence indicates that vaccines are safe and effective.

On May 8, 2019, while some areas in the United States were struggling with a resurgence of measles due to low vaccination rates, Kathleen Kennedy Townsend, Joseph P. Kennedy, and Maeve Kennedy McKean publicly stated that while their relative Robert had championed many admirable causes, he "has helped to spread dangerous misinformation over social media and is complicit in sowing distrust of the science behind vaccines."

Kennedy's compensation has risen with the nonprofit's revenue. According to federal tax returns filed by the group, his salary was $131,000 in 2017, rising to $345,000 in 2020, and eventually totaling $500,000 for 2021 and 2022. In 2023, Kennedy was paid $326,000 for 15 weeks of work before taking leave to run for president. However, after being nominated for the position of Health and Human Services secretary following the 2024 United States elections, documentation filed with the U.S. Office of Government Ethics indicating those amounts corresponded to his after-tax income rather than gross income. His actual income from Children's Health Defense was thus $836,571 in 2022, while the 2023 figure of $326,056 appears to be correct. Income from previous years was not corrected.

After Kennedy's departure, Mary Holland was appointed as Chief Executive Officer. Kennedy later became the U.S. Secretary of Health and Human Services on February 13, 2025.

During the 2025 measles resurgence in the United States CHD defended Kennedy's actions as the chief health officer of the US, even as he undermined confidence in the measles vaccine and public health response.

== Anti-vaccination campaigns ==
Children's Health Defense petitioned the Food and Drug Administration in May 2021 to have authorization of all COVID-19 vaccines rescinded, and to refuse to authorize any other vaccine protecting against the disease in the future. The petition was filed by Kennedy and advisory board member Meryl Nass, a doctor who saw her license suspended by the Maine Board of Licensure in Medicine in 2022. Kennedy and Nass advocated for the use of ivermectin and hydroxychloroquine instead of vaccination, even though those two drugs were already known at the time to be ineffective against COVID.

The organization uses social media and internet advertising to propagate anti-vaccination messages, targeting young parents and minorities in the United States. During the COVID-19 pandemic, those communications attempted to downplay the risk posed by the virus, to argue the new vaccines are dangerous, and to undermine public health authorities. The Center for Countering Digital Hate identifies the group as one of the leaders of the anti-vaccination movement online. In August 2022, the organization's accounts on Meta platforms, Facebook and Instagram, were terminated for repeatedly breaching the platforms' policies. While Instagram removed Robert F. Kennedy Jr.'s account from its platform in February 2021, it did not take any measure against the Children's Health Defense account. Between Instagram and Facebook, the organization had a reach of 300,000 subscribers in 2021.

The organization also organized rallies against public health measures aiming at mitigating the impact of the pandemic, such as the one in Washington on January 23, 2022. This particular demonstration featured other leaders of the American anti-vaccination movement such as Del Bigtree; both Kennedy and Bigtree compared vaccine mandates to oppression in Nazi-occupied countries during World War II. The demonstration was also attended by a group from neo-fascist organization Proud Boys.

CHD targets Black Americans with messaging linking COVID-19 vaccination with the Tuskegee Syphilis Study and other instances when ethical violations have been committed against minorities as part of medical studies. Such interventions are likely to hurt the Black community by increasing vaccine hesitancy within that vulnerable population. Echoing other actors in the anti-vaccination movement and Nation of Islam, Children's Health Defense claims that the United States government seeks to harm ethnic minorities by prioritizing them for COVID vaccines. The conspiracy theory is elaborated upon in an hour-long video production Medical Racism: The New Apartheid released in March 2021 by Children's Health Defense and Kennedy. The video also contains recycled anti-vaccination stories about autism, Bill Gates and the Centers for Disease Control. Like other such conspiracy theory videos, it inserts true historical events into its narrative to make its fantastic claims appear more believable.

The organization's social media channels have been shown to amplify conspiracy theories common to other anti-vaccination groups as well as QAnon, such as the "Great Reset" and the "Deep state". A regular output of videos under the heading of "CHD TV" presents their audience with commentary and interviews related to various conspiracy theories.

A study found Children's Health Defense was one of major buyers of anti-vaccine Facebook advertising in December 2018 and February 2019, the other being Stop Mandatory Vaccination. Heavily targeting women and young couples, the advertising highlighted the alleged risks of vaccines and asked for donations. According to an analysis by NBC News, the group is one of three major sources of false claims on vaccination shared on the internet, the other two being the fake news site Natural News and the website Stop Mandatory Vaccination. Facebook subsequently refused to carry anti-vaccination advertising from the group.

Children's Health Defense said that the efficacy of its non-advertising Facebook campaigns has been greatly affected by the platform taking additional measures against misinformation in 2019. In a lawsuit filed with the United States District Court for the Northern District of California in August 2020, against Facebook and four fact-checking services, the group said the viewership of some of its posts on vaccination and 5G wireless was reduced by 95% after they were labelled as misinformation. Even though those messages were allowed to be posted by the group and shared by users, Children Health Defense argues that labelling them as misinformation amounts to censorship; they allege their messages are presented merely as opinions rather than information and as such, cannot be characterized as misinformation. The organization is seeking $5 million in damages.

CHD's film division produced the 2024 video production Vaxxed III: Authorized To Kill. Promoted as a sequel of the 2016 Vaxxed, it presents testimonies of people who were allegedly injured following being vaccinated during the COVID-19 pandemic.

In January 2023, CHD filed a complaint alleging the efforts of major news outlets to limit the spread of COVID-19 misinformation amount to a violation to the Sherman Antitrust Act. The complaint targets The Washington Post, the BBC, Associated Press and Reuters. Along with CHD and Robert F. Kennedy Jr., the plaintiffs include other major spreaders of misinformation, including Joseph Mercola, Ty and Charlene Bollinger, Erin Elizabeth, Ben Tapper, Ben Swann and Jim Hoft. They present themselves as "online news publishers" victimized by media policies aiming at providing accurate reporting of COVID-related information. The case will be heard by United States District Court for the Northern District of Texas judge Matthew Kacsmaryk.

During the 2025 measles resurgence in the United States CHD minimized the danger caused by measles and falsely attributed measles deaths to hospital-acquired infections. CHD published a video interview of the Mennonite parents of a six-year-old Texas girl who, in February 2025, became the first child to die of measles in the United States in around 20 years. The father said that "measles are good for the body". The mother told other parents regarding the measles, mumps and rubella vaccine: "Don't do the shots" with measles being "not as bad as they're making it out to be." The Centers for Disease Control says "Getting MMR vaccine is much safer than getting measles, mumps, or rubella".

CHD hosted a deceptive web site on vaccines and autism visually identical to a public-information CDC web page on the same topic. While the CDC page was clear on the absence of autism risks, the CHD pages described debunked anti-vaccine autism research mixed in with medically accepted research. The CHD web page, which featured the CDC banner and logo and the headline "Vaccine Safety", included testimonials from anti-vaccine parents, e.g. one titled "Mother of 3: I Will Never Vaccinate Again". The deceptive page was removed in March 2025 at the request of the U.S. government.

== Funding ==
From $13,000 in annual revenue in 2014, World Mercury Project brought in $470,000 in revenue in 2015, when Kennedy joined the organization. Its revenues increased to $1.1 million in 2018. With the group becoming a major disinformation hub during the COVID-19 pandemic, its revenue reached $6.8 million in 2020, $15 million in 2021, counting among its new donors LimeWire's founder Mark Gorton, and $23.5 million in 2022. With Kennedy on leave from his position for most of 2023, the group's revenue fell to $16 million.

Children's Health Defense has received substantial anonymized funding via donor-advised funds. According to Rolling Stone, the Fidelity Charitable fund channelled $1 million to Children's Health Defense and some of its state chapters in 2021–2022; the Vanguard Charitable fund gave $1.5 million to the national group and its California chapter between 2020 and 2022; and the Morgan Stanley Global Impact Funding Trust fund channelled $680,000 to the national group and its New York chapter in 2020 and 2021. Another donor-advised fund, the National Christian Foundation, gave a total of $630,000 to the group in 2020 and 2021. Smaller anonymized donations received during the COVID-19 pandemic included Fairfield County's Community Foundation ($200,000) and the Chicago Community Trust ($100,000).

The organization receives a portion of the sales of Ty Bollinger's anti-vaccination video series, which it promotes. Despite its messaging impeding the government's efforts to limit the spread of COVID-19, Children's Health Defense received $145,400 in federally backed small business loans through the Paycheck Protection Program from JPMorgan Chase in 2020. The 2021 tax return for Children's Health Defense indicates that Kennedy was paid above $500,000 for his services as chairman and chief counsel for the organization.

Children's Health Defense initiated a number of court cases, with little success. Requests for contributions to its litigation funds are a major component of its fundraising activities.

Given the impact they had during the height of the COVID-19 pandemic, ethicist Arthur Caplan commented that funding Children's Health Defense and similar groups might have grave consequence in future epidemics.

== Lawsuits ==
Children's Health Defense has initiated a number of court cases against governments, agencies, and media companies, all of which are pending or have been dismissed.

On April 19, 2019, the Kings County (New York) Supreme Court dismissed a lawsuit in which Robert Krakow, Robert F. Kennedy Jr. and Patricia Finn of Children's Health Defense represented five parents of unvaccinated children protesting the decision by New York City authorities to impose mandatory measles-mumps-rubella vaccinations for residents in parts of Williamsburg, New York, as a response to the epidemic of measles in that area. The lawsuit was filed four days earlier against the New York City Department of Health and Human Hygiene and its commissioner. In his ruling, Judge Lawrence Knipel said that the arguments presented by the plaintiffs amounted to little more than "unsupported, bald faced opinion". Responding to Children's Health Defense's claims that the city's reaction to a "garden-variety annual measles outbreak" was excessive, the judge pointed out that the documents filed as evidence in fact demonstrated otherwise. He concluded that "the unvarnished truth is that these diagnoses represent the most significant spike in incidences of measles in the United States in many years and that the Williamsburg section of Brooklyn is at its epicenter. It has already begun to spread to remote locations."

On August 17, 2020, Children's Health Defense sued Poynter Institute for Media Studies, Facebook, and Facebook founder and CEO Mark Zuckerberg, claiming that Politifact censored a truthful public health statement about vaccines through its fact checking. The case was dismissed for failure to state an actionable claim on June 30, 2021. Children's Health Defense has appealed.

On August 16, 2021, Children's Health Defense sued Rutgers because of their vaccine mandate. A federal court dismissed the suit on September 23, 2022.

On August 31, 2021, Children's Health Defense sued the Food and Drug Administration (FDA) for approving the COVID-19 vaccine for children. The federal court dismissed the complaint with prejudice for lack of jurisdiction on January 12, 2023. CHD has appealed.

On January 10, 2023, Children's Health Defense sued Reuters, AP, BBC, and the Washington Post in an antitrust suit, claiming that these groups were working together to keep certain opinions out of the media. As of April 2023, the lawsuit is pending before Judge Kacsmaryk in Texas.

On January 25, 2023, Children's Health Defense sued the FDA under Freedom of Information Act to force release of Vaccine Adverse Event Reporting System data. The lawsuit is pending.

On April 12, 2023, Children's Health Defense sued the National Institutes of Health for failing to produce documents related to correspondence between NIH researchers and individuals who contacted the agency regarding adverse events they experienced after receiving the COVID-19 vaccine. The lawsuit is pending.

== See also ==
- Freedom Angels Foundation
- Polio eradication
- Science Moms
