= Medical Racism: The New Apartheid =

2021 conspiracy theory video about COVID-19

Medical Racism: The New Apartheid is a 2021 video production that promotes conspiracy theories about COVID-19 vaccines. Distributed by the anti-vaccination group Children's Health Defense, it alleges the COVID-19 vaccination efforts are a cover to conduct experiments on the African American and Latin communities. Public health communication experts say the video presents past injustices committed against African Americans in order to make debunked anti-vaccination claims more believable.

At the urging of disinformation experts, the film was removed from Facebook.

== Production and release ==
The hour-long video was released on 11 March 2021, on the website of Children's Health Defense. A trailer published on Instagram was viewed more than 160,000 times.

The group's president, Robert F. Kennedy Jr., is credited as a producer, as well David Centner's Centner Productions, Nation of Islam's Tony Muhammad, anti-vaccination author Curtis Cost, and the CEO of anti-vaccination group Urban Global Health Alliance, Kevin Jenkins. The video was directed by David Massey.

== Assertions ==
The video anchors its narrative in past abuses against African Americans, such as the Tuskegee Syphilis Study and other instances when ethical violations have been committed against minorities as part of medical studies. With those historical facts as background, the video continues with what has been described by public health communication experts, as conspiracy theories, notably debunked claims from the anti-vaccination movement.

According to the central assertion of the video, the United States government seeks to harm ethnic minorities through COVID-19 vaccines. The video repeats long-discredited claims that some cases of autism are somehow linked to the MMR vaccine. Conclusive studies have shown vaccination does not increase the probability a child will develop autism.

Similarly, the video misrepresents a 2014 preliminary study indicating Somali immigrants to the United States may have higher levels of antibodies against rubella than the general population. The video falsely concludes this study proves African Americans are receiving higher doses of vaccines, a leap of logic that isn't based on any data. It also repeats anti-vaccination stories about Bill Gates and the Centers for Disease Control.

Viewers are being told African Americans are naturally immune from COVID-19, while in fact the community has been hard hit by the pandemic from the beginning. They are also told taking vitamin D supplement protects against the disease, a common but misleading statement of anti-vaccination activists.

The video ends with Kennedy requesting the viewers disregard information dispensed by health authorities and doctors, and reinforcing the narrative that components in COVID-19 vaccines are unsafe. Contrary to Kennedy's assertions, the safety of common COVID-19 vaccines has been well documented and complete assessments published by health authorities. Vaccines widely distributed in the United States have received authorization based on clinical trials that included a significant number of Black people.

== Participants ==
Medical historian and Yale professor Naomi Rogers, said she feels "used" because she unwittingly participated in what turned out to be "an advocacy piece for anti-vaxxers". While her statements that appeared in the film were accurate, they are embedded in a wider narrative that she had "enormous problems with" and that the racial justice issues she fervently supports were "twisted for the purpose of this anti-vax movement."

Dr. Oliver Brooks former president of the National Medical Association, regrets appearing in the film because, despite African American legitimate concerns based on past medical mistreatment, Brooks supports getting vaccinated.

== Possible impact on public health ==
The video does not actually present evidence that vaccines are unsafe in any way, but attempts to stir up distrust in health authorities, doctors, and the government in the African-American and Hispanic communities, a common strategy of the anti-vaccination movement. This is despite the 1974 National Research Act which is a federal law giving out ethical guidelines for medical research on human beings. A lot of medical institutions have made race and ethnicity a protected group for medical research, making discriminatory studies like Tuskegee almost impossible to be implemented in the present-day.

The American anti-vaccination movement has long courted minorities, coopting the language of civil rights to paint vaccination initiatives as a threat or an injustice. Actual injustices such as the Tuskegee study make these false narratives more believable for vulnerable communities. Perhaps a result of this tragedy, vaccination rates for those segments of the population are often somewhat lower than average. Experts say that by targeting Black Americans with messaging linking COVID-19 vaccination with the Tuskegee study and other instances when ethical violations have been committed against minorities as part of medical studies, the video's producers are likely to hurt the Black community by increasing vaccine hesitancy within that vulnerable population. Meanwhile, racialized communities have been hit harder by the COVID-19 pandemic, due to socio-economic factors, with mortality rates among Black, Hispanic and Native Americans nearly triple the rate of White Americans.

== See also ==
- COVID-19 vaccine
- Protests over responses to the COVID-19 pandemic
- Race and health
- Timeline of the COVID-19 pandemic in 2019

=== Other videos promoting medical conspiracy theories ===
- The Other Side of AIDS
- House of Numbers: Anatomy of an Epidemic
- Plandemic
- The Greater Good
- Died Suddenly
