= Trace Amounts =

2014 anti-vaccination film by Eric Gladen

Trace Amounts: Autism, Mercury, and the Hidden Truth is a 2014 anti-vaccination biographic film by Eric Gladen, who claims to have experienced mercury poisoning after receiving a tetanus vaccine. In the film, he presents his investigation on the cause of his condition, argues that vaccines should be made without mercury, and claims that mercury and aluminum content of vaccines is linked to autism, a claim that is contrary to the scientific consensus. The film questions a 2011 journal article which described the vaccine-autism connection as "the most damaging medical hoax of the last 100 years".

The film has been promoted by celebrities including Robert De Niro & Robert F. Kennedy, Jr. It was marketed through targeted "boutique screenings" to celebrities known to be sympathetic to the anti-vaccination cause, including Jim Carrey, Ed Begley, Jr., and Bob Sears, and is credited with inspiring Carrey's "Twitter meltdown" following passage of California Senate Bill 277, which removed personal belief exemptions from vaccination requirements. It has also been used by Robert F. Kennedy Jr. in his lobbying efforts targeting Oregon lawmakers who could influence Oregon Senate Bill 442, which sought to remove personal belief exemptions from vaccination requirements, but was subsequently withdrawn.
