= Media coverage of the COVID-19 pandemic =

Media coverage of the COVID-19 pandemic has varied by country, time period and media outlet. News media has simultaneously kept viewers informed about current events related to the pandemic, and contributed to misinformation or fake news.

== Background ==
COVID-19 is a disease caused by a virus called SARS-CoV-2. Most people who contract COVID experience mild symptoms whereas others become severely ill. Elderly people and those with certain underlying medical conditions are more likely to get severely ill. There are currently four vaccines available in the United States to help prevent COVID-19: Pfizer, Moderna, Novavax, and Johnson & Johnson. They are known to be safe, effective, and reduce the risk of severe illness. The virus spreads when an infected person breathes out droplets and very small particles that contain the virus.

== Level and nature of coverage ==
The (COVID-19) pandemic has put a tremendous strain on many countries' citizens, resources, and economies around the world. This includes the social distancing measures, travel bans, self-quarantines, and business closures are changing the very fabric of societies worldwide. With people forced out of public spaces, much of the conversation about this pandemic and the after effects now occurs online and on social media platforms.

Within January 2020, the first full month in which the outbreak was known, Time recorded 41,000 English-language articles containing the term "coronavirus", of which 19,000 made it to headlines. This was compared with the Kivu Ebola epidemic, which had 1,800 articles and 700 headlines in August 2018. Paul Levinson, a researcher in communications and media studies, attributed this wide disparity to backlash from perceived overcoverage of the 2014 Ebola outbreak, coupled with concerns regarding Chinese censorship of the coverage.

Recode reported on 17 March that, out of 3,000 high-traffic news sites, around 1 percent of published articles are related to the disease, but those articles generate around 13 percent of all views, with subtopics such as social distancing, flattening the curve and self-quarantine being particularly popular. The total number of article views itself was some 30 percent higher in mid-March 2020 compared to in mid-March 2019.

An analysis of approximately 141,000 English language news headlines related to the Coronavirus from January 15, 2020, to June 3, 2020, uncovered that 52% of headlines evoked negative sentiments while only 30% evoked positive sentiments. The authors suggest that the headlines are contributing to fear and uncertainty which is having negative health and economic outcomes. Other studies in different contexts and focused in different media have found that news have not portrayed coping strategies and health behaviors as much as they could have. Other authors suggest that news coverage has resulted in the politicization of the pandemic, has been excessively concerned for the performance of political actors over the provision of scientific and self-efficacy information, and has been highly polarized.

A November 2020 paper from the National Bureau of Economic Research titled "Why Is All COVID-19 News Bad News?" found that 91% of stories by major American media outlets about COVID-19 have a negative tone compared to 54% for major media outlets outside the United States and 65% for scientific journals.

Issues with misinformation and fake news led to the development of CoVerifi, a platform that has the potential to help address the COVID-19 "infodemic".

It has been claimed that the extended and prolonged coverage of the pandemic may have contributed to a COVID-19 information fatigue, making it more difficult to communicate updated information. Media experts say the challenge for some news outlets is accurately conveying the nuance of pandemic science to the public.

== Misinformation ==
In January 2020, the World Health Organization declared that an "infodemic" of false information was helping the virus propagate. Academics documented the spread of fake news and other disinformation and theorize it within particular national and transcultural contexts and trends. The number of outlets and entities, from traditional journalism to social media, covering the COVID-19 pandemic will surely prove to have been a source of misinformation and confusion related to virus spread information and national and state policies. Dr. Sylvie Briand, Director of Global Infectious Hazards Preparedness Department of the World Health Organization, mentioned that one of the major concerns related to communication challenges is the role of social media. Briand stated that the WHO is carefully monitoring the coronavirus infodemic on social media utilizing artificial intelligence. According to Pew Research Center the most popular sources of news for adults in the United States include news websites and social media. Also, Twitter is recorded as having the highest number of news focused users among other social media outlets Romanian scholar Sofia Bratu conducted a study which considered individuals' perception of the source of fake news by surveying nearly 5000 U.S. citizens and analyzing data from The Economist, Gallup, Pew Research Center, YouGov, among other reputable survey organizations. Scholars suggest that misinformation is to blame for escalated stress reactions, physical and mental health declines related to stress, and increased burden on healthcare facilities with patients who are not truly exhibiting symptoms or are exhibiting symptoms as an adverse reaction to false cures and treatments. However, Brafu does mention that televised interviews with COVID-19 survivors may in fact assist in alleviating stress, panic, and fear of death.

Others argue that newsrooms should play a role in filtering misinformation before 'giving it oxygen'. While not all fake news is putting the health and safety of the people at risk, information related to COVID-19 could. Niemen Reports suggests that newsrooms should be working collaboratively to deliver consistent messages related to false and inaccurate information by choosing headlines, wording, and images carefully.

An example of fake news related to the COVID-19 pandemic was that the virus could be spread via 5G. Another, that the virus was manually created in a lab by government leaders or that consuming chlorine dioxide would treat or prevent the virus. Other viral pieces of misinformation include that Vitamin C and garlic could cure the virus even though this claim was never substantiated by health professionals. Misinformation has also led to racial discrimination and displays of xenophobia toward Chinese individuals through the referral of the disease as the "Chinese virus pandemonium" or "Wuhan Virus" or "China Virus". As a result of this misinformation several fact checking websites have appeared which utilize information from the CDC and WHO to debunk common viral information.

In early 2021 the Center for Countering Digital Hate (CCDH) released a report titled The Disinformation Dozen, which exposed that that two-thirds (65%) of anti-vaccine content including misinformation and outright lies, shared or posted on social media could be attributed to just twelve individuals. The individuals are Robert F Kennedy Jr, Joseph Mercola with his partner Erin Elizabeth, Ty Bollinger, Charlene Bollinger, Sherri Tenpenny, Christiane Northrup, Sayer Ji, Kelly Brogan, Ben Tapper, Rashid Buttar, Rizza Islam and Kevin Jenkins.

== By country ==
=== Canada ===
The first confirmed case of COVID-19, as reported by the Canadian Healthcare Network, was January 25, 2020 in a Toronto man who had recently traveled to Wuhan, China. The first case was announced on Toronto Public Health Officials' Twitter account.

=== China ===
The Chinese government has received significant criticism for its censoring of the extent of the outbreak. Immediately following the initial quarantine of Wuhan and nearby cities, Chinese state media such as the People's Daily initially encouraged social media posts seeking help between citizens on platforms such as Weibo. Multiple journalists then published investigative pieces contradicting official statements and media, indicating that the number of cases in Wuhan is significantly larger than is reported.

=== Germany ===
The first cases of COVID-19 were identified in Germany in January 2020. Controversy erupted over a January 2021 article published by the German newspaper Handelsblatt, the article stated that the AstraZeneca vaccine was not effective for older adults, but many responded saying the newspaper provided incorrect data.

In March 2023, a radio report on "The failure of science journalism in the pandemic broadcast" (German: Das Versagen des Wissenschaftsjournalismus in der Pandemie) was broadcast by the German public radio station Deutschlandfunk Kultur.

=== Mexico ===
Studies on the media framing of COVID-19 in Mexico claim newscasts and newspapers focused on the political side of the pandemic rather than on providing scientific and self-efficacy information. Television was the medium most used by Mexicans for getting information about COVID-19. Heavy social media users were more likely to believe in fake news, and to distrust media.

=== The Netherlands ===
A study that focused on newspaper reporting about the situation in hospitals during the first year of the COVID-19 pandemic in the Netherlands found that there was no indication for the presence of misinformation in newspaper reporting, stating that newspapers can be a credible source of information. However, the authors did note that certain aspects received significantly more or less attention in newspaper articles compared to what hospitals themselves focused on. They attribute this to gatekeeping, whereby journalists deem some aspects are more relevant to the general public than others.

=== Russia ===
Media coverage of COVID-19 in Russia was heavily influenced by the Kremlin's agenda, focusing on controlling the narrative and minimizing the political fallout from the pandemic. The state-run media landscape in Russia, dominated by outlets like RT (Russia Today), Sputnik, and Russia-1, presented a highly curated and often positive view of the pandemic, contrasting it with the perceived chaos and mismanagement in Western countries.

=== Sweden ===
The first case of COVID-19 was identified in Sweden on February 4, 2020. The most media coverage of Sweden occurred in early March. Sweden received a great deal of media attention because it was considered to be using its own plan, the 'Swedish Model' of herd immunity. Research has looked at the nature of media coverage and how Swedish policy was covered by the news media. Rachel Irwin, a researcher from Sweden, found there were six main themes: "(1) Life is normal in Sweden, (2) Sweden has a herd immunity strategy, (3) Sweden is not following expert advice, (4) Sweden is not following WHO recommendations (5) the Swedish approach is failing and (6) Swedes trust the government." She comments that not all of the information was framed correctly. She wrote a letter to the British Medical Journal stating that media coverage has inaccurately portrayed the COVID-19 policies in Sweden and that it did not have a "herd immunity" plan. Another article suggests that as other countries came up with different policies the Swedish policy model went from "bold to pariah".

=== United Kingdom ===
The first confirmed case in the UK, as reported by GOV.UK, was January 30, 2020. In reporting about the outbreak, British tabloid newspapers such as The Sun and the Daily Mail used language described as "fear-inducing". According to Edelman's Trust Barometer, journalists were the least-trusted source for information regarding the pandemic in the UK, with 43 percent out of the surveyed trusting them to report the truth, behind government officials (48%) and "most-affected countries" (46%). This was despite conventional media being the primary source of information regarding the pandemic in the UK.

A study conducted in May 2020 in association with the University of Oxford showed that the UK public is exhibiting declining trust in the government as a source of information. Only 48% rated the government relatively trustworthy, which is down from 67% six weeks earlier. Moreover, 38% of people are stating that they are concerned false or misleading COVID-19 information from the government, a figure which was only 27% six weeks earlier.

=== United States ===
The first confirmed case in the United States, as reported by the CDC, was January 22, 2020. News coverage in the U.S. has been more negative than in other countries, but has also helped promote safety behaviors including social distancing. Local news has played an important role in keeping communities informed, including in rural areas.

Some journalists in the U.S. have been praised for their coverage of the COVID-19 pandemic including Ed Yong and Helen Branswell. Among media scholars, many elements of mainstream journalists' efforts to adapt to the pandemic and provide reliable information to their audience have been praised, but some have been criticized. Writing for The Atlantic, Ed Yong noted that, as the pandemic unfolded, "drawn to novelty, journalists gave oxygen to fringe anti-lockdown protests while most Americans quietly stayed home". He also faulted that they "wrote up every incremental scientific claim, even those that hadn't been verified or peer-reviewed."

President Donald Trump initially accused media outlets such as CNN of "doing everything they can to instill fear in people", a statement echoed by Acting White House Chief of Staff Mick Mulvaney. Where people get their news has played an important role in people's attitudes and behaviors related to COVID-19. An Axios survey, conducted from 5 March 2020 to 9 March, found that 62% of Republican supporters believed that the outbreak's coverage by media is exaggerated, compared to 31% of Democratic supporters and 35% of independents. A Pew Research survey conducted from 20 April to 26 April found that 69% of U.S. respondents believed that the news media have covered the outbreak "very well" or "somewhat well" and that the number of U.S. respondents who believed the media have exaggerated COVID-19 risks had somewhat decreased. The survey also found that 68% of Republican supporters believed that the news media exaggerated COVID-19 risks, compared to 48% of all U.S. adults and 30% of Democratic supporters. Overall, coverage of the COVID-19 pandemic in the US was substantially more negative than in other parts of the world—regardless of whether the news outlet was considered right-leaning or left-leaning. In hindsight, a study by Ángel Torres and collaborators on misinformation during the pandemic suggests that further progress is needed regarding the transparency of the verification process of independent third-party fact checkers.

Opinion hosts and guests on Fox News, a conservative media outlet, initially downplayed the disease outbreak, with some guests accusing other media outlets of overplaying the disease for political reasons. Trump also used interviews with the network to promote his early efforts to downplay the virus. One Fox Business host, Trish Regan, claimed on her show Trish Regan Primetime that COVID-19 media coverage was deliberately created by the Democratic Party as a "mass hysteria to encourage a market sell-off", and was "yet another attempt to impeach the president". Her program would later be cancelled. Tucker Carlson initially took a much more serious position regarding the disease, criticizing other hosts which compared it with ordinary seasonal flu, and stating on 9 March that "people you trust — people you probably voted for — have spent weeks minimizing what is clearly a very serious problem." Later on, the network's pundits began to endorse claims that hydroxychloroquine was an effective treatment for COVID-19 symptoms, criticize the wearing of face masks to control spread, and provide positive coverage to anti-lockdown protests.

According to study published by Cambridge University Press in May 2020, right-wing media coverage of COVID-19 helped facilitate the spread of misinformation about the pandemic.

The COVID-19 pandemic has opened a new door for social media and mental health in ways that have never existed before. Mental health is at the forefront because it has been so severely impacted by the pandemic. People who were already suffering with mental health issues is being exacerbated by the isolation. Social media has not been covered as much even though it plays such an important role whether it comes from a positive or negative light. People were able to find online communities to help them during the isolation, but it also was negative because it made people feel more separated from everyone around them. It also does not help because everyone is so invested in their social media that they forget to communicate with the humans around them in person. The COVID-19 pandemic has also been associated with mental health challenges for those who are not infected with it, including the social and economic impacts of quarantine, physical distancing, stay-at-home orders, gathering bans, nonessential business closures, and additional measures introduced to reduce community transmission of the virus. Challenges for mental health associated with COVID-19 may arise via either indirect experiences with the virus (e.g., bereavement; social isolation and loneliness; uncertainty; socioeconomic distress) or from personal infection. A number of media outlets have specifically covered deaths of anti-vaccine advocates from COVID-19, leading to disputes over the propriety of such coverage.

== See also ==
- COVID-19 pandemic on social media
- Impact of the COVID-19 pandemic on journalism
- Misinformation related to the COVID-19 pandemic
