= Charles Eisenstein =

American public speaker and author

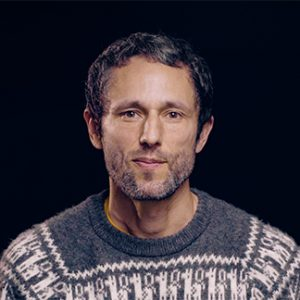
- Born: 1967 (age 58–59)
- Education: Yale University
- Occupations: Author, educator, public speaker
- Writing career
- Subjects: Environmentalism, economics, spirituality, philosophy
- Notable works: The Ascent of Humanity (2007), Transformational Weight Loss, Sacred Economics (2011), The More Beautiful World Our Hearts Know Is Possible (2013)
- Website: charleseisenstein.org

Charles Eisenstein (born 1967) is an American public speaker, author, and activist. His books include The Ascent of Humanity, Sacred Economics, and The More Beautiful World Our Hearts Know is Possible.

Eisenstein's work covers a wide range of topics, including the history of human civilization, economics, spirituality, and the ecology movement. Key themes explored include anti-consumerism, interdependence, and how myth and narrative influence culture. According to Eisenstein, global culture is immersed in a destructive "story of separation", and one of the main goals of his work is to present an alternative "story of interbeing". Much of his work draws on ideas from Eastern philosophy, the spiritual teachings of various indigenous peoples, and New Age themes.

As an activist, Eisenstein has been involved in the Occupy and New Economy movements. He has promoted eco-villages, permaculture, local currencies, gift economies, economic degrowth and universal basic income. Eisenstein was a senior advisor for Robert F. Kennedy Jr.'s 2024 presidential campaign.

== Life and career ==
Born in 1967, Eisenstein graduated from Yale University in 1989 with a degree in Mathematics and Philosophy. He lived in Taiwan for nine years, where he became fluent in Mandarin Chinese and worked as a translator. He married there, had children, and later returned to the United States. He describes his late 20s through his mid 30s as "a long period of intensifying crisis". During this time, he held short-term positions as a construction worker, college instructor, and yoga teacher, but spent most of his time as a stay-at-home dad. He then spent four years writing The Ascent of Humanity, which was published in 2007 and became his first commercially successful book, launching his writing career. Eisenstein has four sons; one with his current wife, Stella, and three with his previous wife, Patsy. He currently lives in Rhode Island, New England.

Eisenstein has published op-ed pieces in The Guardian and The Huffington Post on topics including genetic modification, the patenting of seeds and debt. He is a contributing editor at the website Reality Sandwich. He appeared on Oprah Winfrey's Super Soul Sunday on July 16, 2017. He has periodically published essays on his website and in his newsletter.

On May 15, 2023, Eisenstein announced that he had taken an advisor's position in the campaign of then-Democratic (later independent) Presidential candidate Robert F. Kennedy Jr. In that capacity, he participated in a fundraising event, held June 27, 2023, bringing together several prominent anti-vaccine activists, such as Mikki Willis, Sayer Ji, Del Bigtree, Sherri Tenpenny and Joe Mercola. According to federal election filings, Eisenstein was paid as much as $21,000 per month for his services to the campaign. After Kennedy dropped out of the presidential race and endorsed Donald Trump, Eisenstein expressed a willingness to influence Trump's thinking if he were asked, yet said he would not be joining Trump's campaign. In the early days of Trump's return to the White House, Eisenstein was sympathetic to the anti-establishment diagnosis and some of Trump's objectives, but deeply skeptical of Trump's methods and some of his policies.

By 2026, Eisenstein's criticisms of the second Trump administration's record had grown considerably, particularly his sense that Trump had not fulfilled his anti-war promises in light of the 2026 Iran War. Asked to comment on Kennedy in September 2026 following a speech at the 2026 Republican National Convention where he declared that his ideals had now "found a home" in the Republican Party, Eisenstein said "I'm not close to him anymore. . .I have friendly feelings towards him even though I'm appalled by some of his positions and the administration." When asked if he would support a hypothetical Kennedy presidential run in 2028, Eisenstein said "I think he's a good man. I don't want him to be President. No, I wouldn't serve in his campaign again." He further stated that a 2028 campaign "would be a very different project from the one that I believed myself to be involved in, with maybe some degree of naivete."

== Writings ==
=== The Ascent of Humanity ===
The Ascent of Humanity, published in 2007, draws together Eisenstein's thoughts about the history of human civilization. It explores the development of what he calls the "separate human realm", drawing distinctions between hunter-gatherer and agricultural societies. In Eisenstein's view, a greater sense of separation from nature began with the emergence of agriculture and has been accelerating to the present day.

Other themes include the role of various languages, mathematics, art, religions and other symbolic systems to structure subjective reality at the levels of the individual and of culture. He argues that these have a strong, largely unconscious effect on attitudes toward time and the natural world.

It was read on the Unwelcome Guests radio show and the reading was later released as an audiobook.

=== Sacred Economics ===
Eisenstein wrote his 2011 book Sacred Economics as part of the New Economy movement. The book revolves around the theme of how the current monetary system based on interest and usury, along with the abandonment of the gift economy, led to social alienation, competition and need for an economic system predicated on continuous growth. It has been either fully or partially translated into at least nine languages. Accordingly, his primary goal is the reestablishment of some form of gift economy as a means of strengthening relationships in contrast to money economies which commodify our relationships and render people interchangeable. He asserts that money is created by the conversion of free human interactions into paid services. Eisenstein himself attempts to practice the gift economy in his own life.

The book explores additional economic proposals including a negative-interest currency following Silvio Gesell, social dividends, economic degrowth, and a personal emphasis on right livelihood over financial motivation. In other writings, he has also advocated for universal basic income. He describes and rejects what he describes as the myth of scarcity which he claims fosters greed and anxiety.

=== The More Beautiful World Our Hearts Know Is Possible ===
The More Beautiful World Our Hearts Know Is Possible was published in November 2013. It argues that many of the social, economic, political, and environmental problems covered in his earlier works can be traced to an underlying worldview that he calls the "Story of Separation" — that humans are separate from each other and from the rest of the natural world. A new story that is emerging, the "Story of Interbeing", is a "story of the world that we really care about". The book describes this as a time of transition between these stories: "Internally, it [the transition] is ... a transformation in the experience of being alive. Externally is it ... a transformation of humanity's role on planet Earth". He deconstructs the old story while describing the new. For example, the best way to interrupt the story of separation is to give someone an experience of non-separation. Publishers Weekly described it as "a revolutionary and interactive book—in the sense that it inspires the reader to think out of the ordinary", adding that Eisenstein "will be noted in antiquity as one of the seminal and pioneering storytellers of this new world".

=== Climate—A New Story ===
Climate—A New Story was published in 2018. It is described as 'flipping the script on climate change', and addresses the framing, tactics and goals of our approach to environmental issues. Eisenstein proposes that if we were to feel that the rivers, forests, and creatures of the natural and material world were sacred or at least valuable in their own right, then our response might be more wholesome and ultimately effective. He decries valuing the living world simply for its carbon credits or for preventing the extinction of one species or another.

=== The Coronation ===
In the early stages of the COVID-19 pandemic in March 2020, Eisenstein published a viral essay called "The Coronation" on his website. In this essay, he argued that the nascent global pandemic presented an opportunity for collective spiritual transformation, if systems of political, medical, and informational control are resisted. Over the course of the pandemic, he wrote several more essays on his website and in his newsletter expressing vaccine skepticism, questioning public health measures such as masking, social distancing, lockdowns, vaccine passports and vaccine mandates. He also expressed ongoing concern that the pandemic was being used as an excuse for governments to act in an authoritarian manner, and drew on René Girard's mimetic theory to argue that those who chose not to be vaccinated were being scapegoated by society and government authorities. Eisenstein's positions on COVID-19 vaccines and public health measures led his publisher, North Atlantic Books, to part ways with him in 2021. Chelsea Green Publishing later published these essays in book form as The Coronation: Essays From the Covid Moment.

== Reception ==
In 2013, journalist and author Rory Spowers described Eisenstein as a "refreshing new voice", saying that he is young, fresh, well-informed, humble but articulate, with a very spiritual perspective. He added that Eisenstein is too intelligent to be confrontational but that, through his works, especially The Ascent of Humanity and Sacred Economics, "he's really moved the whole thing along in a number of ways". Eisenstein was influential in the Occupy Movement.

In March 2020, Eisenstein wrote an essay called "Coronation." In the essay, which was tweeted out by Jack Dorsey, Eisenstein argued that the nascent global pandemic presented an opportunity for collective spiritual transformation, if systems of political, medical, and informational control are resisted. As the pandemic wore on, he questioned the rationality of public health measures like social distancing and vaccines, and suggested that conspiracy theories conceal truths that society is unprepared to accept. In 2021, Eisenstein's publisher, North Atlantic Books publicly disavowed his essay "Mob Morality and the Unvaxxed," in which he expressed his belief that those who chose not to be vaccinated for COVID-19 were being persecuted. The publisher committed to "donate all net earnings we make from the substantial sales of his books to three organizations committed to the rights and welfare of some of the very people his essay invisiblizes, condescends to, and exploits."

== Bibliography ==
- The Open Secret, 2001, Authorhouse ISBN 978-0759655775
- The Yoga of Eating: Transcending Diets and Dogma to Nourish the Natural Self , 2003, NewTrends Publishing ISBN 978-0967089720
- The Ascent of Humanity. Civilization and the Human Sense of Self, 2007, Panenthea Productions ISBN 978-0977622207
- Transformational Weight Loss, 2007, Panenthea Press ISBN 978-0977622214
- Sacred Economics: Money, Gift, and Society in the Age of Transition, 2011, EVOLVER EDITIONS ISBN 978-1583943977
- The More Beautiful World Our Hearts Know Is Possible. The Vision and Practice of Interbeing, 2013, North Atlantic Books ISBN 978-1-583-94724-1
- Climate: A New Story, 2018, North Atlantic Books ISBN 978-1623172480
- The Coronation, 2022, Chelsea Green Publishing ISBN 978-1645021780
