= Deaths of anti-vaccine advocates from COVID-19 =

Media coverage of the COVID-19 pandemic includes reporting on the deaths of anti-vaccine advocates from COVID-19 as a phenomenon occurring during the COVID-19 pandemic. The media also reported on various websites documenting such deaths, with some outlets questioning whether this practice was overly unsympathetic. Reports noted phenomena including "deathbed conversions", in which vaccine opponents changed their minds and began encouraging vaccination before dying, with reports of these statements meeting disbelief by vaccination opponents; and on groups of deaths within specific demographics, such as anti-vaccine radio hosts.

== Reporting on the phenomenon ==
Many news reports in 2021 noted instances in which persons described as anti-vaccination activists—those who advocated against use of the COVID-19 vaccine—themselves died from COVID-19, with The Hill, for example, reporting on the death of Marcus Lamb, a 64-year-old American televangelist, by saying that "[a]nother leader in the conservative media space has died from COVID-19 and his death marks a growing trend of like-minded anti-vaccine advocates that have themselves succumbed to the virus". The Washington Post noted that "the Internet has been a graveyard of stories about unvaccinated deaths, which make up the majority of the pandemic's current victims". A number of websites or social media outlets list such deaths, including "[a] website called Sorry Antivaxxer, which catalogues the COVID-19 deaths of people who had publicly posted their rejection of the vaccine", as well as "the Twitter account Covidiot Deaths, [and] the Reddit forum called the Herman Cain Award". The Hill article on the death of the televangelist noted three other media figures who had died of the disease, describing them as "conservative media leaders who caught COVID-19 and eventually died from the virus after refusing to take a vaccine and flouted anti-vaccine rhetoric".

Some commentators have criticized the practice of reporting these deaths, describing them as celebrating the suffering of others. Maura Judiks, writing in The Washington Post, criticized such outlets for promoting a lack of empathy for the survivors. It was reported in The New York Times that the social media profiles of anti-vaccination activists made their families susceptible to trolling after their deaths, even where the surviving family members were not anti-vaccination, or even encouraged vaccination based on their personal loss. It further reported the opinion of a psychologist that, in the United States, "sentiments underpinning these websites are an outgrowth of the nation's extreme polarization", with those who perceive themselves to be politically aligned against vaccination opponents taking pleasure in the suffering of perceived enemies. The cataloging of such deaths has been described as "heartless and unrepentant schadenfreude", and has been argued to derive not only from political differences, but from frustrations felt by overwhelmed medical professionals and healthcare systems. A column in the Los Angeles Times, following reactions to the COVID-19 death of antivaccine Orange County Deputy District Attorney, countered that there "may be no other way to make sure that the lessons of these teachable moments are heard", an opinion which itself "came under fire" in social media responses.

Such deaths may also be commemorated by the awarding of the Herman Cain Award, an ironic award given to people who expressed hesitancy toward COVID-19 vaccines or face masks, who later died from COVID-19 or its complications.

== Reporting of deathbed conversions ==
A number of news outlets also reported on deathbed conversions of opponents of vaccination or their peers, with some of those dying using their final days and hours to urge their followers and loved ones to be vaccinated. For example, The Hill reported that when one of the anti-vaccine talk radio hosts became seriously ill with COVID-19, he texted a friend to urge her to get vaccinated, telling her, "I wish I had gotten it", while Slate similarly reported that another radio host, who earlier "had expressed skepticism of the COVID-19 vaccine" had "changed his mind and urged friends and family members to get vaccinated from his hospital bed". The New York Times reported on the father of one such victim becoming an ardent proponent of vaccination. This was also reported in The BMJ in October 2021, in a piece which said that "[a]mong the people admitted to hospital with severe respiratory failure from COVID-19 pneumonia who have subsequently died, some had previously held strong anti-vaccine beliefs. Once critically ill, some have changed their minds and shared their stories on social media as a warning".

The Washington Post noted that "[t]he narrative is even more potent when the victim expresses a dying wish for others to get vaccinated, and regrets their decision not to". Whether reporting of these deaths actually encourages opponents of vaccination to change their position is unclear, but it has been asserted that proponents of vaccination "have expressed thanks for providing a record of anti-vaccine deaths that have helped them convince skeptics to get the shots". Geriatrics and acute general medicine consultant David Oliver, writing for The BMJ, notes that some anti-vaccine activists have accused doctors of falsifying these asserted changes of heart on the part of their patients. He added that addressing misinformation can reinforce conspiracy theories as a side effect.

== Notable instances ==
In August 2021, a number of American conservative talk radio hosts who had discouraged COVID-19 vaccination, or expressed skepticism toward the COVID-19 vaccine, died from COVID-19 complications. These included 65-year-old Marc Bernier, self-nicknamed "Mr. Antivax", from Daytona, Florida; 65-year-old Dick Farrel, who referred to the pandemic as a "SCAM DEMIC"; Jimmy DeYoung Sr, an octogenarian Christian radio host who decried the vaccine as a form of government control; and 61-year-old Phil Valentine, who compared vaccination status badges worn by medical workers with the yellow badges which German Jews were ordered to wear by the Nazis. In September 2021, another anti-vaccine conservative radio host, 62-year-old Bob Enyart, who "vocally refused to get vaccinated and actively spread false claims about the COVID-19 virus", died of COVID-19, prompting a new round of reports discussing the phenomenon within that demographic. The phenomenon was repeated in November 2021, when Marcus Lamb, co-founder of the Daystar Television Network who promoted skepticism toward all vaccines, died of COVID-19.

Olavo de Carvalho, a Brazilian COVID-19 vaccine critic, journalist, and conspiracy theorist, was reported by his daughter to have died of COVID-19 after testing positive.

When Hai Shaulian, a prominent Israeli opponent of vaccination, died from COVID-19 in September 2021, his supporters "claimed that he was murdered by government authorities... so that he would not disclose the truth about what they claim is a fictitious pandemic and a dangerous vaccine", a response characterized by Israeli newspaper Haaretz as a cult-like refusal to acknowledge reality.
