= Center for Countering Digital Hate =

Advocacy organisation

- Formation: 19 October 2018; 8 years ago
- Type: Private company limited by guarantee, NGO
- Tax ID no.: 86–2006080
- Registration no.: 11633127
- Key people: Imran Ahmed (CEO)
- Funding: Funded by philanthropic trusts and members of the public
- Website: counterhate.com
- Formerly called: Brixton Endeavours Limited

The Center for Countering Digital Hate (CCDH), formerly Brixton Endeavors, is a British-American not-for-profit NGO company with offices in London and Washington, D.C. with the stated purpose of stopping the spread of online hate speech and disinformation. It was started by Dr. Siobhan Marie McAndrew, Kirsty Jean McNeill, Morgan James McSweeney and David Craig Roberts, and it campaigns to deplatform people that it believes promote hate or misinformation, and campaigns to restrict media organisations such as The Daily Wire from advertising. CCDH is a member of the Stop Hate For Profit coalition.

According to public records, the organisation was incorporated in 2018 in London as Brixton Endeavours Limited. It changed its name to Center for Countering Digital Hate in August 2019. In 2021, its US office was registered as a nonprofit organisation in the United States. CCDH's current CEO is Imran Ahmed.

== Activities ==
The CCDH has targeted social media platforms for what it says are insufficient efforts on their part to fight neo-Nazis and anti-vaccine advocates. The CCDH wrote an article asking Google to stop running advertisements for what the CCDH called "racist disinformation and conspiracies" relating to George Soros, claims that the U.S. National Institutes of Health funded the Wuhan Institute of Virology, and the veracity of climate change claims. Advertisements from American news site The Daily Wire and other sources were targeted by CCDH in a 2021 campaign.

=== Campaigns ===
==== Galloway and Hopkins ====
In January 2020, the CCDH campaigned against Katie Hopkins, a far-right political commentator, and George Galloway, a veteran politician and broadcaster. TV presenter Rachel Riley and the CCDH directly lobbied "Big Tech" companies to have both journalists removed from major social media platforms. According to media reports, Riley and Imran Ahmed had a "secret meeting" with Twitter's London based staff in January 2020, demanding the removal of Hopkins and Galloway from their platform. CCDH's attempt to remove Galloway from Twitter failed, but Hopkins had her account suspended for a week in February 2020.

==== David Icke ====
In April 2020 the CCDH launched a campaign against the British conspiracy theorist David Icke, who gained increased media attention during the COVID-19-associated lockdown in the United Kingdom. In November 2020, Twitter removed Icke's account for violating the site's rules against spreading misinformation about the COVID-19 pandemic.

==== Stop Funding Misinformation ====
"Stop Funding Misinformation" campaign logo

Originally called Stop Funding Fake News, the campaign asks advertisers to stop placing ads on websites it argues are spreading misinformation ("fake news"). It was inspired by the US success of Sleeping Giants which had convinced several advertisers not to advertise on the Breitbart News website. Ted Baker, Adobe Inc., Chelsea FC, eBay and Manchester United were among the 40 brands and charities that the campaign had persuaded to stop advertising on what it called fake news sites. It has been accused of being set up for political purposes by political staffers.

In March 2019, charity Macmillan Cancer Support removed an advertisement from The Canary website after complaints from the campaign and from others. The campaign accused The Canary of promoting conspiracy theories, defending antisemitism, and publishing fake news. The Canary said changes to Google and Facebook's algorithms and the Stop Funding Fake News campaign led to The Canary downsizing its operations; it said that it was "against the actions of a state, not against Jewish people as an ethnic group" and that it had been "smeared with accusations of anti-Semitism by those who've weaponised the term for political ends". Labour Party MP Chris Williamson described the campaign against The Canary as "sinister".

==== Google advertisements for media organisations ====
In 2023, the CCDH has campaigned to restrict the reach of the following media organisations by targeting their use of the Google advertising platform: Breitbart News, CNSNews, Hot Air, Newsbusters, Newsmax, MRCTV, RedState, Twitchy, The Daily Wire, and Zero Hedge.

The CCDH notified Google that the Zero Hedge website had published what it called "racist articles" about the Black Lives Matter protests. As a result, in June 2020, Google found that reader comments on Zero Hedge breached its policies and banned Zero Hedge from its advertising platform.

==== Climate change denial ====
In November 2021, a report by the CCDH identified "ten fringe publishers" that together were responsible for nearly 70 percent of Facebook user interactions with content that denied climate change. Facebook said the percentage was overstated and called the study misleading. The "Toxic Ten" publishers were: Breitbart News, The Western Journal, Newsmax, Townhall, Media Research Center, The Washington Times, The Federalist Papers, The Daily Wire, RT, and The Patriot Post.

==== Vaccine disinformation ====
In a 2021 report, the CCDH identified what it called the top 12 spreaders of anti-vaccine disinformation on social media platforms during the COVID-19 pandemic. Labeled as The Disinformation Dozen, they were: Joseph Mercola, Robert F. Kennedy Jr., Ty and Charlene Bollinger, Sherri Tenpenny, Rizza Islam, Rashid Buttar, Erin Elizabeth, Sayer Ji, Kelly Brogan, Christiane Northrup, Ben Tapper, and Kevin Jenkins. Meta, formerly Facebook, rejoined that the CCDH did not clearly explain how they surveyed the posts on the site, countering that posts from the twelve named profiles were responsible for only about 0.05% of all views of vaccine-related content on Facebook. Nevertheless, Meta confirmed that they had removed or otherwise penalized vaccine misinformation content associated with each of the twelve accounts.

==== TikTok ====
In December 2022, the CCDH claimed that the social media platform TikTok promoted self-harm and dieting content to users.

==== Twitter/X Corp. ====
In June 2023, the CCDH stated that after Elon Musk's acquisition of Twitter, the site "fails to act on 99% of hate posted by Twitter Blue subscribers". Twitter's successor company, X Corp., responded to this by filing a lawsuit against the CCDH on 31 July 2023, saying that they "falsely claim it had statistical support showing the platform is overwhelmed with harmful content." On 25 March 2024 District Judge Charles Breyer dismissed the case, writing that "This case is about punishing the Defendants for their speech." In April 2024, X Corp. appealed the ruling to the United States Court of Appeals for the Ninth Circuit.

== History ==
=== Role in the election of Keir Starmer ===
Paul Holden, in his book The Fraud, stated that CCDH, and its sister organisation Stop Funding Fake News (SFFN, now hosted by CCDH), were incubated using resources (including late-declared donations totalling £740,000) from the organisation Labour Together. He stated that Labour Together was a means of organising to replace Jeremy Corbyn as leader of the UK Labour Party with a politician to his right. Labour Together's Director Morgan McSweeney went on to lead Starmer's election campaign to succeed Corbyn as Labour leader and became Starmer's Chief of Staff once he was elected as UK Prime Minister. CCDH and SFFN represent themselves as non-partisan campaigns. They have targeted some right-wing media outlets but they focused on UK left wing media outlets that were supportive of Corbyn, particularly The Canary.

=== US visa sanction on CEO ===
In December 2025, the US State Department imposed a visa sanction on CCDH CEO Ahmed for leading what US Secretary of State Marco Rubio called "organized efforts to coerce American platforms to censor, demonetize, and suppress American viewpoints they oppose". Ahmed subsequently filed an injunction order against U.S. authorities which was granted by Judge Vernon S. Broderick from the Southern District of New York, blocking U.S. officials from "arresting, detaining or transferring" him.

== Funding ==
In 2020, the BBC noted some of CCDH's funders as the Pears Foundation, the Joseph Rowntree Charitable Trust and the Barrow Cadbury Trust.

In August 2023, Jim Jordan, the chair of the US House of Representatives Judiciary Committee, wrote to CCDH requesting the CCDH provide all documents and communications between the CCDH and the U.S. Executive branch and social media companies, a list of employees, contractors and grants received, to determine if the U.S. government "has coerced and colluded with companies and other intermediaries to censor speech". Responding to The Washington Post reporters, the CCDH denied receiving any funds from the United States government and provided documents it said showed its bipartisan approach.

== Publications ==
- Don't Feed the Trolls: How to Deal with Hate on Social Media (2019) – a 12-page pamphlet on how internet trolls operate, linked to a campaign of the same name involving Gary Lineker and other celebrities
- The Anti-Vaxx Industry (2020) – describes how social media platforms such as Facebook enable the growth of lucrative anti-vaccination ('anti-vaxx') activism (including the finding that 400 anti-vaxx social media accounts reach 58 million followers), and that this has an impact on vaccine take-up, and recommends demonetisation as a strategy to respond to this.
- Will to Act (2020) – argues that the largest social media companies fail to enforce their own rules preventing anti-vaccine and COVID-19 conspiracy theory content
- The Anti-Vaxx Playbook (2020) – explores anti-vaxx tactics, messages, and the use of social media
- Hatebook (2020) – co-authored by the Coalition for a Safer Web, accuses Facebook and Instagram of hosting 61 accounts that were selling neo-Nazi merchandise to fund far-right extremism.
- Failure to Act (2021) – jointly with Restless Development, tracks action taken by social media companies in response to anti-vaccine content
- Malgorithm (2021) – a critical analysis of Instagram and Facebook’s user engagement and content recommendation algorithm
- The Disinformation Dozen (2021) – identifies the top 12 spreaders of anti-vaccine disinformation on social media platforms. The report cites these individuals as responsible for 65% of all anti-vaccination content across Facebook, Instagram and Twitter. It was cited by the Biden administration in July 2021, in its criticism of Facebook and other social media companies for allowing pandemic disinformation to spread.
- The Toxic Ten (2021) – identifies "ten fringe publishers" that together were responsible for nearly 70 percent of Facebook user interactions with content that denied climate change.

== See also ==
- Internet censorship in the United Kingdom
- Stop Funding Hate, another British campaign with a similar methodology
