= Do You Believe in Magic? (book) =

2013 book by Paul Offit

Do You Believe in Magic? The Sense and Nonsense of Alternative Medicine
- Hardcover edition, 2013
- Author: Paul Offit
- Language: English
- Subject: Alternative medicine
- Genre: Nonfiction
- Published: 2013; 20 June 2013 (UK)
- Publisher: HarperCollins (US); Fourth Estate (UK)
- Pages: 255
- ISBN: 0062222961

Do You Believe in Magic? The Sense and Nonsense of Alternative Medicine – called Killing Us Softly: The Sense and Nonsense of Alternative Medicine in the United Kingdom – is a 2013 book about alternative medicine by Paul Offit, an American expert of infectious diseases and vaccines. It was published in the United States by HarperCollins (255 pages) and in the UK by Fourth Estate (20 June 2013, 336 pages).

== Content ==
The book criticizes alternative medical treatments as ineffective, particularly vitamins and dietary supplements. Among the supplements of which Offit is critical in the book is the use of Vitamin C to treat the common cold, which also leads him to criticize Linus Pauling for promoting vitamin C for this purpose. In the book, Offit also attributes much of alternative medicine's effectiveness to the placebo effect, which is the subject of one of the book's chapters. He also notes that alternative medical treatments can have serious side effects, such as paralysis resulting from chiropractic and viral infections caused by acupuncture. Among the individual doctors Offit criticizes in the book are Joseph Mercola and Rashid Buttar, as well as Andrew Weil and Deepak Chopra. Offit has said that he wrote the book as a result of an experience in which he had surgery on his left knee, and his doctor recommended that Offit take glucosamine and chondroitin sulfate. Offit then looked for scientific studies on the efficacy of these supplements and found some that indicated they were no more effective than placebo.

== Reception ==
Do You Believe in Magic? was reviewed in the Boston Globe by Suzanne Koven and by Gail Ross in Publishers Weekly. Ross concluded that the book was "a bravely unsentimental and dutifully researched guide for consumers to distinguish between quacks and a cure." Another review appeared in The New Republic, where Jerome Groopman wrote that Offit "writes in a lucid and flowing style, and grounds a wealth of information within forceful and vivid narratives." Victoria Maizes, the director of the Arizona Center for Integrative Medicine, criticized the book's claim that St. John's wort is not an effective treatment for depression, citing a 2008 review that found that it was more effective than placebo. Offit responded in an interview with NPR that the point he was trying to make in the book was only that St. John's wort was not effective for severe depression, and that there have been "some studies of value" with respect to treating moderate depression.

In 2013 Offit was presented with the Robert B. Balles Prize in Critical Thinking by the Committee for Skeptical Inquiry (CSICOP) for Do You Believe in Magic?. "Offit is a literal lifesaver... educates the public about the dangers of alternative medicine, may save many, many more."
