= Sayer Ji =

Alternative medicine advocate (born 1972)

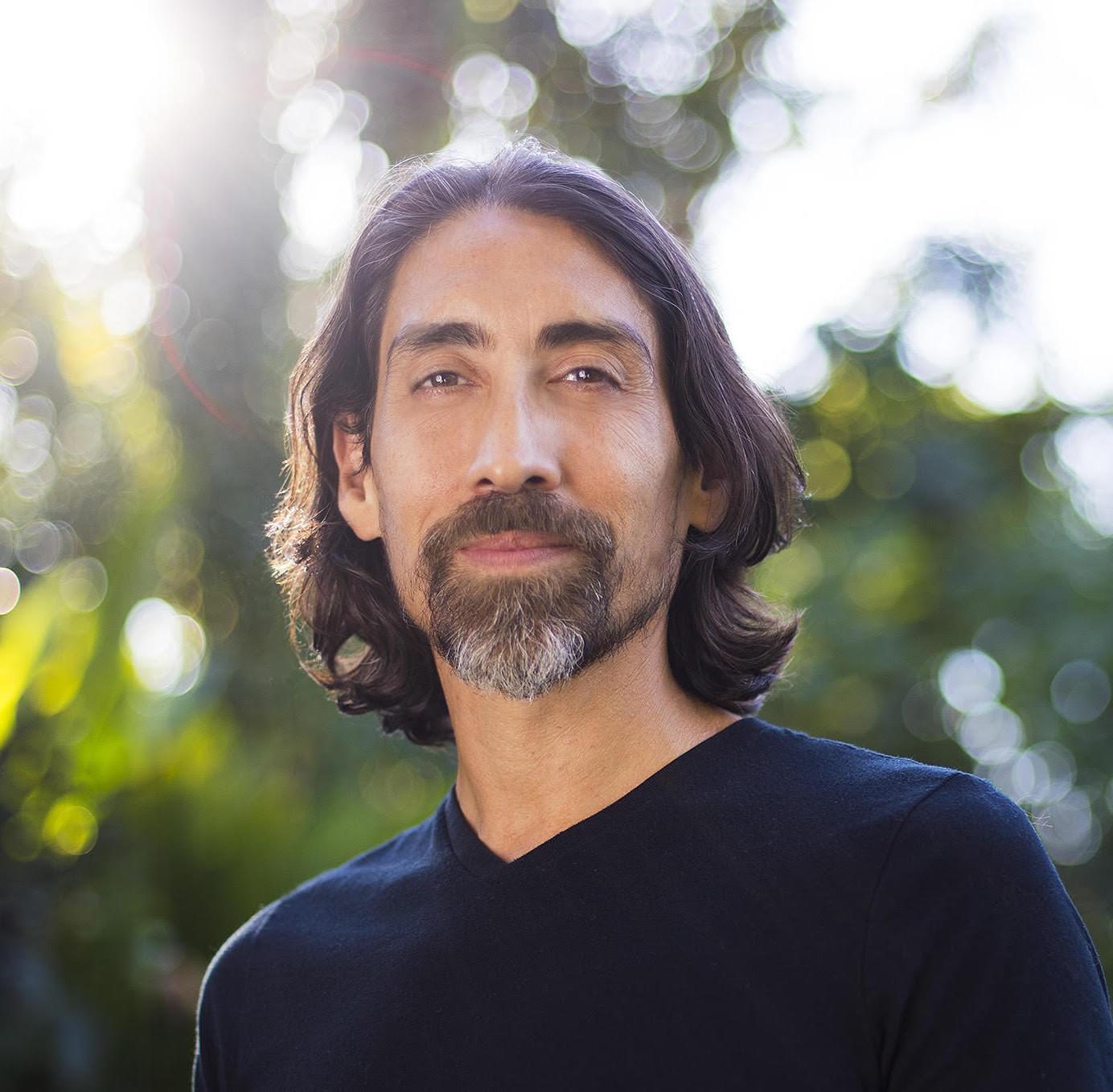
- Born: October 10, 1972 (age 53)
- Occupation: Alternative medicine advocate
- Years active: 2008–present
- Known for: GreenMedInfo
- Spouse: Kelly Brogan (m. 2019; div. 2022)
- Website: www.sayerji.com

Sayer Ji (born October 10, 1972) is the founder of alternative medicine portal GreenMedInfo, a website that aggregates and indexes selected research citations from the National Library of Medicine's PubMed database on topics related to natural and integrative health. The website has been accused by critics, including McGill University's Office for Science and Society, of promoting pseudoscientific interpretations of medical research by providing "a highly selective slice of the biomedical literature, biased toward positive results for natural ingredients and spun to make bad studies look better".

The Center for Countering Digital Hate alleged in its 2021 'Disinformation Dozen' report that Ji was one of twelve individuals promoting most of the misinformation that can be found online about vaccines. Meta, formerly Facebook, responded that posts from the twelve named profiles were responsible for only about 0.05% of all views of vaccine-related content on Facebook.

== Background ==
The son of a biochemist, Ji obtained a BA in philosophy from Rutgers University in 1995. He went on to manage an organic food market in Bonita Springs, Florida, after working with camps and facilities for troubled youths. He developed an interest in Zen Buddhism during that period, but stopped short of joining the movement.

He is the former editor of the defunct International Journal of Human Nutrition and Functional Medicine and a member of the advisory board and a former vice-president of the National Health Federation, a lobby group opposing government regulation of alternative health practitioners and dietary supplement retailers.

Ji became popular promoting alternative medicine beliefs, including ancient healing practices and the claim that the appearance of some foods indicates which organs they benefit. While he earlier had invited his readers to be suspicious of governments, health authorities, and pharmaceutical companies during the COVID-19 pandemic, Ji joined other proponents of alternative medicine in embracing conspiracy theories about allegedly oppressive global organizations.

He was married to Kelly Brogan from 2019 to 2022. He lives in Florida.

== GreenMedInfo ==
Ji's website, GreenMedInfo, was started in 2008. It purports to allow users to search articles from the research portal PubMed on alternative medicine topics. However, tests made in 2019 by the McGill Organization for Science and Society showed only articles appearing to indicate positive results for alternative medicine treatments are displayed as search results through GreenMedInfo, ignoring the large number of research papers denying the effectiveness of alternative medicine.

The website, described as a "colossal exercise in cherry picking", also presents unreliable health and nutrition information, as well as common conspiracy theories, as facts, notably about the efficacy of vaccination.

Using web browsing data collected between 2016 and 2019, one study found that GreenMedInfo was a top site for vaccine-skeptical information.

As of 2021, annual subscription plans to GreenMedInfo range from $75 to $850. In 2019, the website claimed some one million views per month.

== Social media disinformation ==
Ji denies being an anti-vaccine activist, despite being identified by the Center for Countering Digital Hate as one of the "prominent people who oppose vaccines" and promote vaccine misinformation. Jonathan Jarry of McGill University wrote: "Ji, who is anti-vaccination and anti-GMO, has no scientific training."

The Center for Countering Digital Hate (CCDH) identified Ji as one of twelve individuals promoting most of the misinformation that can be found online about vaccines, along with his spouse (at the time) Kelly Brogan, Robert F. Kennedy Jr., Christiane Northrup, Ty and Charlene Bollinger, and supplement giant Joseph Mercola.

Meta, formerly Facebook, rejoined that the CCDH did not clearly explain how they surveyed the posts on the site, countering that posts from the twelve named profiles were responsible for only about 0.05% of all views of vaccine-related content on Facebook. Nevertheless, Meta confirmed that they had removed or otherwise penalized vaccine misinformation content associated with each of the twelve accounts.

He promotes anti-vaccination videos sold by Ty and Charlene Bollinger and receives a commission whenever his referrals result in a sale, a practice known as affiliate marketing. He used this network of affiliates to help Brogan expand her own audience. The couple often appeared together in videos promoting their respective products and workshops, presenting their relationship in spiritual terms, such as "Our Spiral Path".

Ji falsely claimed on Facebook that the Pfizer COVID-19 vaccine killed more people than the virus itself. Like Brogan, he also discouraged the public from using face masks to limit the spread of the virus. Other information presented by Ji and GreenMedInfo has been flagged as false or misleading.

In 2020, both Twitter and Instagram removed GreenMedInfo from their platform as part of their efforts to limit the spread of misinformation about COVID-19. Pinterest had already banned Ji in 2018.

Ji participated in an online fundraising event to support the presidential campaign of Robert F. Kennedy Jr. The round table, held June 27, 2023, brought together several prominent anti-vaccination activists, such as Mikki Willis, Del Bigtree, Charles Eisenstein, Sherri Tenpenny and Joe Mercola. He has since distanced himself from Kennedy, disagreeing with his stance on the Gaza war.

== List of publications ==
- Ji, Sayer (2020). Regenerate: Unlocking Your Body's Radical Resilience through the New Biology. Hay House. ISBN 9781401956387.
- Ji, Sayer; Le Vere, Ali (2018). "Revisioning cellular bioenergetics: Food as Information and the Light-Driven Body". In Bakhru, Aruna (ed.). Nutrition and Integrative Medicine A Primer for Clinicians. CRC Press. ISBN 9781498759489.

== See also ==
- America's Frontline Doctors
- Children's Health Defense
- COVID-19 misinformation
- COVID-19 misinformation by governments
- List of conspiracy theories
- List of unproven methods against COVID-19
- Plandemic
- ScienceUpFirst, a Canadian science communication campaign focusing on the pandemic
