= New Economy movement =

New Economy movement may refer to:

- New Economy movement - alternative economic theory
- New Economy Movement in the United States - group of organizations

== See also ==
- New Economics (disambiguation)
