= Herman Cain Award =

Ironic award to COVID-19 skeptic victims

- Website type: Subreddit
- Available in: English
- Website: reddit.com/r/HermanCainAward
- Users: 484,000 members
- Launched: September 21, 2020; 6 years ago

The Herman Cain Award is an ironic award given to people who expressed hesitancy toward COVID-19 vaccines or face masks, who later died from COVID-19 or its complications. The award is named after American businessman and political figure Herman Cain, a Republican politician who died of COVID-19 complications after attending a 2020 Trump Tulsa rally in support of President Donald Trump without wearing a face mask. Cain had publicly tweeted the disease was not deadly and discouraged people from taking it seriously. A text label which says "Awarded" is emblazoned on the conversation thread containing evidence and community discussions of a third party's anti-COVID mitigation positions and their subsequent death.

The concept is associated with the subreddit r/HermanCainAward, where posts about people who have "made public declaration of their anti-mask, anti-vax, or Covid-hoax views" are marked as "nominated" if the person is hospitalized with COVID-19. If the person dies, the post is marked "awarded". The subreddit also flags users who show pictures of their COVID-19 vaccination cards as "Immunized to Prevent Award" (IPA).

The award is controversial: some health experts assert that it contravenes common medical ethics, while others argue that it promotes an effective public health message. Cain's daughter called the group behind the award "insignificant and irrelevant."

== History ==
=== Background ===
The Cain Gang
(@THEHermanCain)
tweeted:

It looks like the virus is not as deadly as the mainstream media first made it out to be.

30 August 2020

Cody Johnston
(@drmistercody)
tweeted:

Replying to @THEHermanCain

Sir, the virus killed you. You died from it.

30 August 2020

Herman Cain, a prominent Republican businessman and former presidential candidate, publicly denied the severity of COVID-19 and spread COVID-19 misinformation during the first months of the COVID-19 pandemic. In June 2020, he attended a Trump rally in Tulsa where many participants did not engage in social distancing or mask wearing. Cain tested positive for COVID nine days later and was hospitalized, before eventually dying of the disease on July 30. One month after his death, his Twitter account stated, in a since-deleted tweet, that "It looks like the virus is not as deadly as the mainstream media first made it out to be", which was met with considerable mockery online. Cain's name "became synonymous with the grandstanding hubris of the MAGA movement", given the apparent irony of Cain's account downplaying a disease that had killed him.

=== Origin of Award ===
According to Business Insider, the subreddit "was originally focused on people who were against wearing masks or didn't believe the deadly virus was dangerous" and that "Early posts created by founder and moderator FBAHobo were about politicians like Nashville Metro Council member Tony Tenpenny and Arkansas GOP county chair Steven Farmer, who both died from COVID complications." According to Le Monde, "In its early days, HCA was primarily fueled by articles found in the press", but that "in recent months, the examples have been drawn directly from a Facebook page of Covid-19 victims. Publication after publication, the pattern invariably repeats itself: one person (anonymized to respect Reddit rules) says all the bad things they think about vaccines, masks, or sometimes even doubts the existence of the pandemic. Often the memes (humorous diversions) used to illustrate mistrust of the vaccine are the same. The following screenshot tells us that the person has just fallen ill, and sometimes that the illness does not really give them a break. Calls to pray for help may follow, before a loved one finally announces the death."

On September 7, 2021, a member of r/HermanCainAward alleged that other members of the subreddit were doxing and harassing family members of recently deceased COVID-19 patients. Later that month, moderators of the subreddit put in place new rules requiring all posts to redact the full name and faces of all individuals included in any social media screencaps, unless the individual in question was a public figure.

== Award recipients ==
Many award recipients are unnamed individuals whose likeness has been obscured. The community of reviewers comes to learn of the "awardee" through screenshots of their social media posts about COVID. Award recipients often post the same sorts of memes and statements. According to online magazine Slate, common talking points among award winners are that Anthony Fauci is a villain, people who take COVID vaccines are like laboratory rats in an experiment, people who support political liberalism are like sheep, immigrants spread disease much more than citizens, and vaccine mandates are comparable to the Nazi treatment of the Jewish people in the Holocaust. Slate also says award winners compare themselves to lions who are proud and free, or share tips on arguing with waiting staff at restaurants that require guests to wear masks.

According to the moderators, by October 2021, 2,393 people had been nominated for the award, 2,515 people had received the award, and 71 people had received IPAs.

== Reception ==
Subscriptions to the subreddit grew from 2,000 on July 4, 2021, to 5,000 in early August, to more than 100,000 on September 1, to 243,000 on September 17, to 276,000 on September 21, to 339,000 on September 29, to more than 350,000 on October 7, to more than 375,000 on October 16, and to about 438,000 on December 23 to more than 504,000 on May 30, 2022. By October 2021, r/HermanCainAward received nearly one million unique daily visitors.

WebMD has described the subreddit as turning "death notices from public announcements into a cudgel for public shaming of sorts." According to Gita Jackson of Vice, "Although the Herman Cain Award wasn't created to encourage people to get vaccinated, it's helping anti-vaxxers change their minds." According to Deccan Herald, the subreddit "has been at the centre of debates and discussions on ethics and morality, with many calling for Reddit to take it down" and that "The award is seen by many others as dehumanising anti-vaxxers/maskers as they too grieve the loss of their loved ones who died from not masking up or getting jabbed."

Lydia Dugdale, director of the Center for Clinical Medical Ethics at Columbia University Irving Medical Center, said that "Delighting in the suffering of others lies contrary to everything medical ethics espouses and certainly it's cruel that regular people would do this." F. Diane Barth, a psychotherapist writing for NBC News, described the subreddit as "A dark and sardonic corner of the internet" that "captures the rage and outrage of presumably vaccinated, mask-wearing individuals, many of whom have either been infected with Covid-19 in the past or have watched friends and family become ill — and even die." Barth also said "this so-called award also captures the collective loss of empathy that colors so many of our political and personal conversations right now. Like soldiers who have been trained to see their enemies as less than human, we have forgotten that those who disagree with us are, despite everything, still people."

In an interview with Business Insider, Rocky Moose, one of the subreddit's moderators, said that the subreddit was "an emotional outlet born out of frustration" and that "COVID misinformation kills. We're documenting a pandemic of the unvaccinated". On October 16, 2021, CNBC reported that the subreddit had convinced some readers to get vaccinated against COVID-19. CNBC also reported that r/HermanCainAward was the tenth fastest growing subreddit over the previous thirty days, according to FrontPageMetrics.com, a website that tracks usage of Reddit. When asked about the subreddit by The Washington Post, Herman Cain's daughter Melanie Cain Gallo responded in an email stating: "I had not heard about this, and it has no effect on our family because that group is insignificant and irrelevant."

The Independent compared r/HermanCainAward to the Darwin Awards. The subreddit has inspired a Twitter account of the same name. On September 27, 2021, a Reddit spokesperson told Business Insider in a statement that they were "closely reviewing the COVID-related communities on our platforms for violations of our policies, including r/HermanCainAward."

== Health impacts ==
One public health expert concluded that the subreddit achieved effective public health messaging where official sources had failed. Specifically, the subreddit reached a wide audience by regularly appearing on Reddit's front page, it promoted a message that was simple and authentic, and it highlighted the negative consequences of nonvaccination.

== See also ==
- Darwin Awards, a similar ironic award
