= New Economics =

New Economics or New Economy may refer to:

- New classical macroeconomics
- New Keynesian economics
- New economic history, or cliometrics, the systematic application of econometrics

== See also ==
- New Economy movement (disambiguation)
