= Sherri Tenpenny =

American anti-vaccination activist

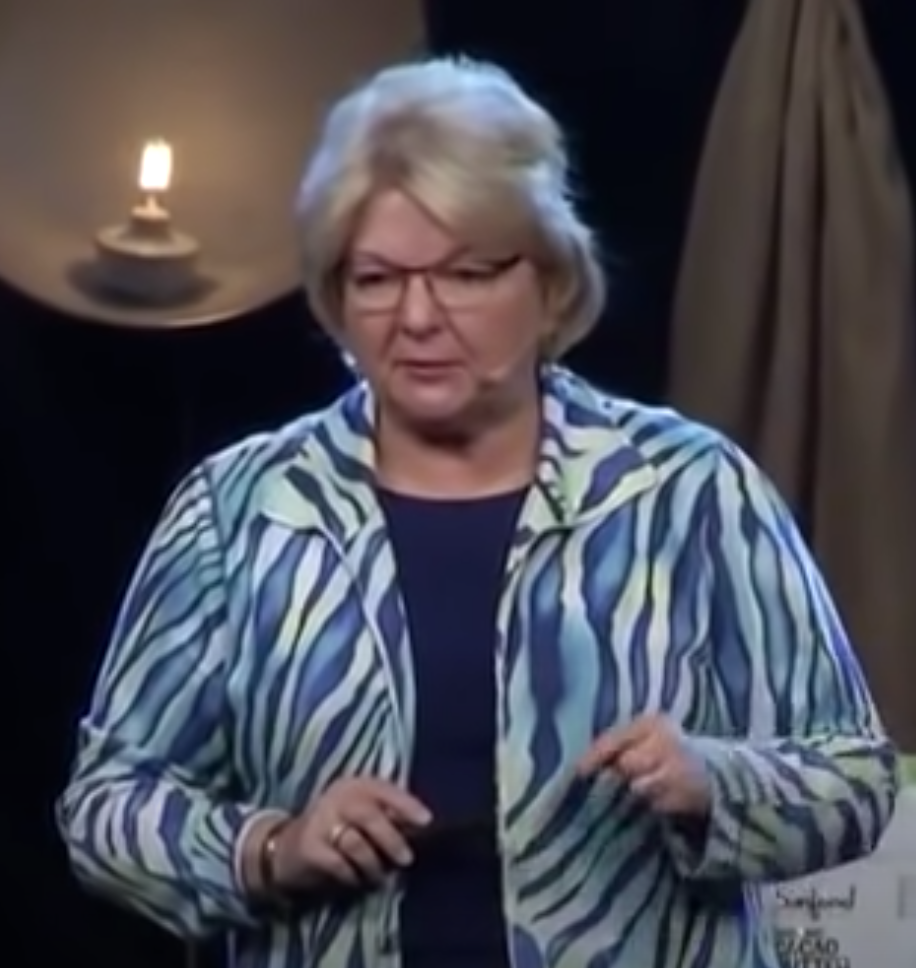
- Tenpenny in 2021
- Occupation: Osteopathic physician
- Years active: 1986–present
- Known for: Anti-vaccine activism
- Notable work: Saying No to Vaccines
- Website: drtenpenny.com

Sherri J. Tenpenny is an American anti-vaccination activist and conspiracy theorist. An osteopathic physician by training, she is the author of four books opposing vaccination. In 2023 the State Medical Board of Ohio indefinitely suspended Tenpenny's medical license for failure to participate in its investigations. Her license was restored in 2024 and expired in 2025.

Her 2015 lecture tour of Australia was canceled due to a public outcry over her absolute vaccine opposition, which fails to acknowledge established scientific consensus. A 2021 Center for Countering Digital Hate analysis concluded that Tenpenny is among the top twelve individuals and organizations spreading COVID-19 misinformation and pseudoscientific anti-vaccine misinformation on social media platforms. She has falsely asserted that the vaccines magnetize people and connect them with cellphone towers.

== Education and career ==
Tenpenny graduated with a Bachelor of Arts from the University of Toledo in 1980 and received a Doctor of Osteopathic Medicine degree from the Kirksville College of Osteopathic Medicine in Missouri in 1984. From 1986 to 1998, Tenpenny was the director of the emergency department at Blanchard Valley Hospital in Findlay, Ohio. She opened an osteopathic practice in 1994 and went on to establish two more practices in 1996 and 2011.

=== Anti-vaccination activism ===
Tenpenny had scheduled a speaking tour in Australia that was set to begin in February 2015, but in January, after objections were raised to her anti-vaccination views, all the venues she was scheduled to speak at cancelled the talks, and the tour was called off. Tenpenny has been criticized by the Stop The Australian Anti-Vaccination Network for "endangering people's health" and "targeting vulnerable parents".

Since 2017, Tenpenny and her business partner, Matthew Hunt, have taught a six-week, $623 course titled "Mastering Vaccine Info Boot Camp" designed to "sow seeds of doubt" regarding public health information. During the course, Tenpenny explains her views on the immune system and vaccines, and Hunt instructs participants on how best to use persuasion tactics in conversation to communicate the information.

Tenpenny promotes anti-vaccination videos sold by Ty and Charlene Bollinger and receives a commission whenever her referrals result in a sale, a practice known as affiliate marketing.

A Facebook page managed by Tenpenny was deactivated in December 2020 as part of the social network's efforts to reduce the amount of misinformation on the platform. Nevertheless, a March 2021 analysis of Twitter and Facebook anti-vaccine content found Tenpenny to be one of 12 individual and organizational accounts producing up to 65% of all anti-vaccine content across several social media platforms. Some of Tenpenny's interviews with anti-vaccination activists and conspiracy theorists have attracted a large audience on Rumble, a video-sharing platform that does not have policies against disinformation.

In 2026, a federal judge ruled that Tenpenny must pay $698,982 in back taxes to the IRS.

== COVID-19 misinformation ==
Tenpenny advocated against the use of face coverings as a COVID-19 mitigation tool despite scientific evidence in favor of their effectiveness.

In a February 2021 video, Tenpenny falsely claimed that COVID-19 vaccines cause death and autoimmune diseases, saying "Some people are going to die from the vaccine directly, but a large number of people are going to start getting horribly sick and get all kinds of autoimmune diseases, 42 days to maybe a year out". There is no evidence to suggest that COVID-19 vaccines cause autoimmune diseases or death.

In early 2021 the Center for Countering Digital Hate (CCDH) released a report titled The Disinformation Dozen, which exposed that that two-thirds (65%) of anti-vaccine content including misinformation and outright lies, shared or posted on social media could be attributed to just twelve individuals, Tenpenny was named as one of those individuals.

In an April 2021 BitChute video, Tenpenny reiterated false claims that COVID-19 vaccines lacked testing and led to long-term health effects. Neither statement contained scientific merit or accuracy. On May 17, 2021, Reuters refuted Tenpenny's claim that COVID-19 vaccines affect sperm and fertility. The news organization reiterated that there is no scientific evidence to back such false claims.

Called by Republicans as an expert witness before a June 2021 hearing of the Ohio House Health Committee, Tenpenny promoted the false claim that COVID-19 vaccines cause people to become magnetized such that metal objects stick to their bodies, adding "There’s been people who have long suspected that there’s been some sort of an interface, yet-to-be-defined interface, between what’s being injected in these shots and all of the 5G towers". The video of her testimony was widely circulated, and in early July 2021 Twitter permanently suspended Tenpenny's account for "violating its COVID-19 misinformation policy". Her YouTube account was removed in September 2021 for breaking the company's policies on COVID-19 misinformation.

As Russia invaded Ukraine in 2022, Tenpenny claimed in posts laden with anti-semitic references that this event was manufactured as a distraction to mask new pandemic restrictions. In 2022 she claimed that COVID-19 vaccines will turn people into "transhumanist cyborgs" and predicted that "by the end of 2022, every fully vaccinated person over the age of 30 may have the equivalent of full-blown vaccine-induced immune suppressed AIDS".

A December 2021 de Beaumont Foundation report cited Tenpenny as one of two extreme examples of a "small subset of [...] physicians" making "disproven claims" about COVID vaccines.

Tenpenny participated in an online fundraising event to support the presidential campaign of Robert F. Kennedy Jr. The round table, held June 27, 2023, brought together several prominent anti-vaccination activists, such as Mikki Willis, Sayer Ji, Charles Eisenstein, Del Bigtree and Joe Mercola.

== Medical license suspension ==
On August 9, 2023, the State Medical Board of Ohio indefinitely suspended Tenpenny's medical license and imposed a $3,000 fine after two years of refusal to respond to questions or participate in her board hearings. Her license was restored in 2024 and expired in 2025.

== Published works ==
- Tenpenny, Sherri J. (2008). Saying No to Vaccines: A Resource Guide for All Ages. Middleburg Heights, Ohio: NMA Media Press. ISBN 978-0-97909-104-9.
- Tenpenny, Sherri (2006). FOWL! Bird Flu: It's Not What You Think. Sevierville, Tenn.: Insight Pub. Co. ISBN 978-1-93286-387-1.
- Tenpenny, Sherri (2006). The Risks, the Benefits, the Choices, a Resource Guide for Parents. Sevierville, Tenn.: Insight Publishing. ISBN 978-0-97434-482-9.
- Tenpenny, Sherri (2005). A Healthier You!. Sevierville, Tenn.: Insight Publishing. ISBN 978-1-93286-385-7.
