= Imran Ahmed (strategist) =

British political consultant (born 1978)

Personal details
- Born: September 1978 (age 47) Manchester, England
- Party: Labour
- Spouse: yes
- Children: 1 daughter

Imran Ahmed (born September 1978) is a British political strategist, author, and activist who has worked for Labour candidates and is the CEO of the Center for Countering Digital Hate.

== Career ==
Ahmed was born in Manchester, England, and attended Manchester Grammar School, where he was the editor of the student newspaper. He is ethnically Pashtun. His parents are Muslims, and he was brought up as a Muslim, but now identifies as an atheist. He studied political science at the University of Cambridge and began a career as a political strategist for the Labour Party.

He worked for candidates Andy Slaughter and then-shadow foreign secretary Hilary Benn.

Ahmed was head of communications for Angela Eagle's brief campaign to replace Jeremy Corbyn in the 2016 Labour Party leadership election. A few hours after Eagle formally declared that she was challenging Corbyn for leadership of the Labour Party, someone broke a window in the building holding Eagle's constituency party headquarters in Wallasey. Ahmed issued a press release under the headline "Violence and threats in past 24 hours", saying that "A brick was thrown through the window of Angela Eagle's constituency office in Wallasey either overnight or this morning." When a journalist from The Guardian questioned this version of the incident, Ahmed banned party staff at the constituency office from talking to the journalist. An internal investigation by the Labour Party found that "Eagle's office had endured a 'significant amount of abuse', including intimidating phone calls that led staff to unplug the phone, a death threat towards her and what appeared to be coordinated denial of service attacks on her internet."

Ahmed was working as a Labour advisor in Portcullis House when the 22 March 2017 Westminster terrorist attack occurred, and later gave an interview to The Independent about what happened, and how he felt.

In 2018, he founded the Center for Countering Digital Hate, a not-for-profit with the stated aim of challenging hate and misinformation online. In April 2020, he was appointed to the United Kingdom's Steering Committee of the Pilot Task Force of the Commission for Countering Extremism. Morgan McSweeney, was formerly a director of this organisation.

In December 2025, the US State Department imposed a visa sanction on Ahmed for leading what US Secretary of State Marco Rubio called "organized efforts to coerce American platforms to censor, demonetize, and suppress American viewpoints they oppose". At the time this was announced, Ahmed was living in Washington, D.C., with his family.

== Personal life ==
Ahmed has a green card which gives him permanent residency permit in the US; his wife and daughter are US citizens.

== Books ==
- Eagle, Angela; Ahmed, Imran (2018). The New Serfdom The Triumph of Conservative Ideas and How to Defeat Them. Biteback Publishing. ISBN 9781785903137.
