= Organic Consumers Association =

Advocacy group

- Abbreviation: OCA
- Formation: 1998
- Founders: Ronnie Cummins, Rose Welch
- Type: Non-profit
- Purpose: Organic agriculture advocacy group
- Headquarters: Finland, Minnesota
- Members: 850,000 (2015)
- National Director: Rose Welch
- Revenue: $1,845,866 USD (2022)
- Website: organicconsumers.org

The Organic Consumers Association (OCA) is a non-profit advocacy group for the organic agriculture industry based in Minnesota. It was founded by Ronnie Cummins and Rose Welch, a married couple. The organization's members include subscribers to their online newsletters, volunteers, supporters, and retail outlets. The organization seeks to influence public opinion on a variety of issues, such as campaigning for GMO labeling, by its own advocacy campaigns and providing funds to other groups and individuals whose goals align with the organization's members, such as US Right to Know (USRTK), of which the association is the sole major sponsor.

The activities of these associated lobbying bodies have been called "antiscientific" and "akin to climate change denialism" by scientists, alleging also that they seek primarily to engage in harassment of food scientists.

OCA was embroiled in controversy for work they did with Andrew Wakefield to mislead the Somali immigrant community about the safety of vaccines. Reporting has also exposed their close ties and financial relationship with Joseph Mercola, an alternative medicine proponent and "major funder of the anti-vaccine movement". The Washington Post reported that Mercola had donated $3.3m to OCA. Mercola and Ronnie Cummins published a book titled The Truth About COVID-19: Exposing the Great Reset, Lockdowns, Vaccine Passports, and the New Normal: Why We Must Unite in a Global Movement for Health and Freedom which the McGill Office for Science and Society described as "monumentally wrong".

Cummins died in 2023. His wife Rose Welch took over as national director.
