= Zero growth =

Zero growth or no growth may refer to:

- Degrowth, a political, economic, and social movement based on ecological economics, anti-consumerist, and anti-capitalist ideas
- Steady-state economy, an economy consisting of a constant stock of physical wealth (capital) and a constant population size
- Zero population growth, a condition of demographic balance where the number of people in a specified population neither grows nor declines
- No-growth disease of cereals, caused by Rhizoctonia solani
