= Erin Elizabeth =

American alternative medicine proponent and purveyor of anti-vaccination misinformation

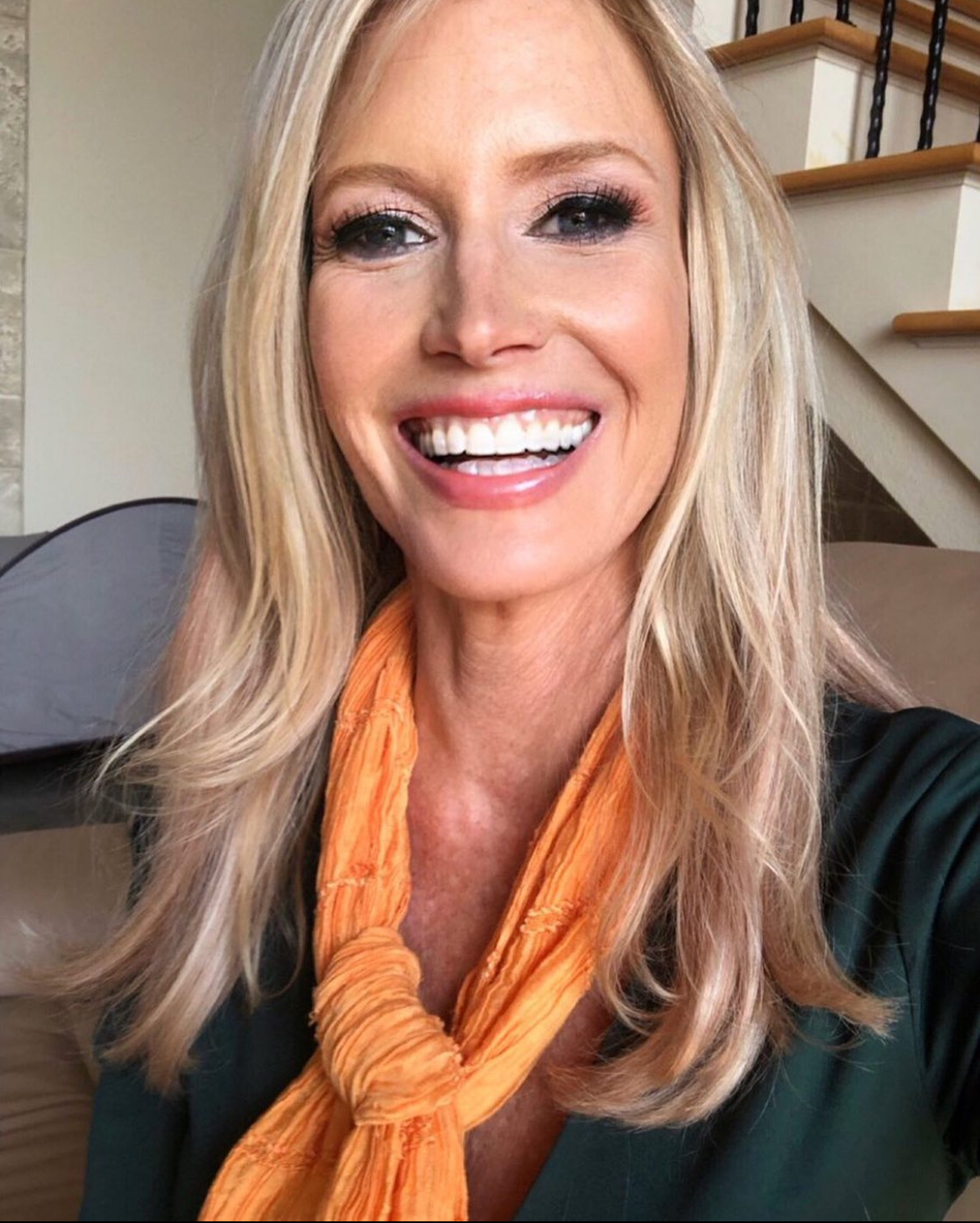
- Born: Erin Elizabeth Finn; Chicago, Illinois, U.S.
- Occupations: Alternative health advocate, anti-vaccinationist, blogger
- Partner: Joseph Mercola

Erin Elizabeth Finn is an American alternative health advocate who blogs under the name Health Nut News. She is known for propagating conspiracy theories relating to healthcare topics like COVID-19 and vaccines. She and her partner Joseph Mercola have been called two of the "disinformation dozen" responsible for 65% of COVID-19 anti-vaccine misinformation on the internet and social media, according to a report by the Center for Countering Digital Hate (CCDH) in 2021.

== Career ==
Finn runs a website called Health Nut News.

By February 2019, Pinterest had banned links to Health Nut News for their promotion of false and dangerous health information.

On May 13, 2021, Facebook banned her personal and professional accounts, her 16 groups, and her Instagram accounts. Vice News reported that an unauthorized source at Facebook said that the accounts were banned for "spammy and inauthentic behavior they relied on to build their audience. They misled people about the popularity of their posts and used fake accounts to spam people and evade our enforcement."

YouTube removed her account in September 2021 for breaking its COVID-19 misinformation policies.

The White House also put pressure on social media companies and mentioned the "disinformation dozen", saying "they were responsible for a great deal of misinformation about Covid-19".

Finn has promoted antisemitic conspiracy theories. She receives affiliate marketing income for promoting disinformation videos.

== Personal life ==
Elizabeth is professionally associated with and the romantic partner of Joseph Mercola, who has been described as "a major funder of the anti-vax movement who has made millions from selling alternative health supplements online." She is based in Ormond Beach, Florida.
