= Lydia Dugdale =

American physician and ethicist (born 1977)

- Born: 1977 (age 48–49)

Lydia S. Dugdale (born 1977) is an American physician and medical ethicist. She holds the Dorothy L. and Daniel H. Silberberg Chair as Professor of Medicine at the Columbia University Medical Center and directs the Center for Clinical Medical Ethics. She also serves as co-director of Clinical Ethics at NewYork-Presbyterian Hospital/Columbia University Irving Medical Center. At Columbia, Dugdale teaches undergraduates and medical students and cares for patients.

Dugdale speaks and publishes widely—outlets include NPR, the Wall Street Journal, The Free Press, and The New York Times. She edited the book Dying in the Twenty-First Century (MIT Press, 2015) and is author of The Lost Art of Dying (HarperOne, 2020), a popular press book on the preparation for death. She recently completed a book on hope that is forthcoming.

== Early life and education ==
Dugdale's maternal grandfather was Norman Alois Ulrich, a B-17 bomber pilot in World War II, who flew with the 334th Squadron of the 95th Bombardment Group. He was shot down over Germany and taken prisoner of war in the Stalag Luft III prison camp.

Dugdale majored in International Service as an undergraduate at American University in Washington DC. She attended medical school at the University of Chicago's Pritzker School of Medicine and completed her medical residency at Yale New Haven Hospital. She joined the faculty at Yale School of Medicine thereafter.

== Career ==
Dugdale is a medical doctor, clinical ethicist, professor, author, and public speaker. She served on faculty at Yale School of Medicine from 2009 to 2019. She was appointed associate director of the newly created Yale Program for Biomedical Ethics, a post she held from 2014 until her departure in 2019. She also co-founded and co-directed the Yale Program for Medicine, Spirituality, and Religion.

Dugdale took a position at Columbia University Vagelos College of Physicians & Surgeons in 2019 as Director of the Center for Clinical Medical Ethics. She holds the Dorothy L. and Daniel H. Silberberg Chair as Professor of Medicine. At NewYork-Presbyterian Hospital/Columbia University Irving Medical Center, Dugdale serves as co-director of Clinical Ethics.

== Personal life ==
Dugdale lives with her family in New York City.

== Bibliography ==
- Dying in the Twenty-First Century: Toward a New Ethical Framework for the Art of Dying Well (MIT Press, 2015)
  - Reviews
    - A. W. Clink, CHOICE: Current Reviews for Academic Libraries (Vol. 53, Issue 2) Oct. 2015
    - Alyson Cox, Theoretical Medicine & Bioethics (2016) 37:437–439
    - Susan Haack, Ethics & Medicine: An International Journal of Bioethics (Vol. 32, Issue 3) Fall 2016
- The Lost Art of Dying: Reviving Forgotten Wisdom (HarperOne, 2020)
  - Reviews
    - Cherie Henderson, “The Lost Art of Dying Well,” Columbia Magazine Winter 2020/21
    - Ian Marcus Corbin, “Existential Matters,” The Point Magazine Aug. 9, 2021
    - Kammer, D. (2021). The Lost Art of Dying: Reviving Forgotten Wisdom, by L.S. Dugdale. Pneuma, 43(3-4), 601-604. The Lost Art of Dying: Reviving Forgotten Wisdom, by L.S. Dugdale
