= Rashid Buttar =

American conspiracy theorist (1966–2023)

- Undated photo of Buttar
- Born: January 20, 1966; London, England
- Died: May 18, 2023 (aged 57)
- Education: Washington University in St. Louis; Des Moines University
- Occupation: Physician
- Known for: Conspiracy theories, anti-vaccine views

Rashid Ali Buttar (January 20, 1966 – May 18, 2023) was an American conspiracy theorist, anti-vaxxer and osteopathic physician. He was known for his controversial use of chelation therapy for numerous conditions, including autism and cancer. He was twice reprimanded by the North Carolina Board of Medical Examiners for unprofessional conduct and cited by the U.S. Food and Drug Administration (FDA) for illegal marketing of unapproved and adulterated drugs. A 2021 analysis found that Buttar was one of the top twelve individual and organization accounts producing up to 65% of all anti-vaccine content on Twitter and Facebook.

== Biography ==
The son of Pakistani parents, Buttar was born in London in 1966. He immigrated with his parents to the U.S. at the age of 9 and grew up in rural Rosebud, Missouri. He attended Washington University in St. Louis, graduating with a bachelor's degree in biology and religion, and then earned a Doctor of Osteopathic Medicine degree from University of Osteopathic Medicine and Health Sciences in Des Moines, Iowa.

Buttar had made the claim of being board certified by several entities, all of which are listed as "questionable organizations" by Quackwatch, including the American Academy of Preventative Medicine, American Academy of Integrative Medicine, and American College for Advancement in Medicine; the latter's primary purpose is the promotion of chelation therapy.

In 1998, Buttar launched and served as medical director for Medical Spa and Rejuvenation Center, a provider of massage services, in Huntersville, North Carolina.

In 2007, Buttar was brought before the North Carolina Board of Medical Examiners, accused of unprofessional conduct for providing ineffectual therapies to four cancer patients. Three of those patients later died. Following public hearings in 2008, the panel recommended that Buttar's license "be suspended indefinitely" and that he be prohibited from treating children and patients with cancer, but stayed the decision, ultimately giving Buttar a formal reprimand in 2010 while allowing him to continue to practice.

Buttar was criticized for his use of chelation therapies, such as topical cream containing chelators to treat children with autism, and for his use of intravenous hydrogen peroxide and EDTA to treat cancer. He came to public attention in 2009 when he alleged to have successfully used chelation therapy to treat Desiree Jennings, a Washington Redskins cheerleading ambassador who had made dubious claims about having dystonia and losing her ability to walk or talk normally after receiving a flu shot. Reporting on the case, Discover described Buttar as "a prominent anti-vaccine doctor who treats 'vaccine damage' cases".

In July 2009, Buttar and his wife Debbie achieved the rank of "blue diamond" within the distributor network of the multi-level marketing company Monavie, which sold an acai-based beverage until going into foreclosure in 2015.

In April 2010, the FDA sent Buttar a warning letter for illegally marketing unapproved topical creams as drugs via his websites, YouTube videos, and radio appearances. FDA inspections also revealed that Buttar's company, V-SAB Medical Labs, had not complied with good manufacturing practices and that its products were adulterated according to the Federal Food, Drug, and Cosmetic Act.

In 2011, as a result of the disciplinary action in North Carolina, the Hawaii Medical Board denied Buttar a medical license.

In 2019, the North Carolina Medical Board disciplined Buttar after receiving two complaints. In one case, a physician was worried that Buttar's treatment of a cancer patient hindered appropriate treatment and increased the patient's pain and suffering. In the other case, Buttar admitted that his personal relationship with the parent of a young patient constituted a boundary violation. Buttar and the Medical Board settled the complaints in a Consent Order that included a reprimand and a requirement to take courses in ethics and recordkeeping. Buttar acknowledged that his conduct constituted "unprofessional conduct including, but not limited to, departure from or the failure to conform to the ethics of the profession." Additionally, regarding the cancer patient, Buttar acknowledged that his documentation of care "failed to conform to the standards of acceptable and prevailing medical practice".

In March 2021, an analysis by the Center for Countering Digital Hate of Twitter and Facebook anti-vaccine content found Buttar to be one of the top twelve individual and organization accounts producing up to 65% of all anti-vaccine content on the platforms.

Buttar died on May 18, 2023, of an undisclosed cause, at the age of 57. Before his death he claimed he had been "poisoned" and targeted due to his anti-vaccine stance; some claimed he had "died suddenly", despite his failing health in the months before his death.

== COVID-19 conspiracy theories and misinformation ==
During the COVID-19 pandemic, a series of videos featuring Buttar were posted to YouTube by the Next News Network website, known to publish misleading and far-right content. In these videos, Buttar disparaged Anthony Fauci and made false claims, such as connections between 5G cell phone networks and "chemtrails" on one hand and COVID-19 on the other. YouTube removed the video a week after it was posted, replacing it with a message saying, "This video has been removed for violating YouTube’s Community Guidelines."

Buttar promoted anti-vaccination videos sold by Ty and Charlene Bollinger and received a commission whenever his referrals resulted in a sale, a practice known as affiliate marketing.

In early 2021 the Center for Countering Digital Hate (CCDH) released a report titled The Disinformation Dozen, which exposed that that two-thirds (65%) of anti-vaccine content including misinformation and outright lies, shared or posted on social media could be attributed to just twelve individuals, Buttar was listed as one of these individuals.

== See also ==
- List of unproven and disproven cancer treatments
- Quackery
- Snakeoil
- The book Do You Believe in Magic?, which includes a chapter about Buttar.
