= New Economy Movement in the United States =

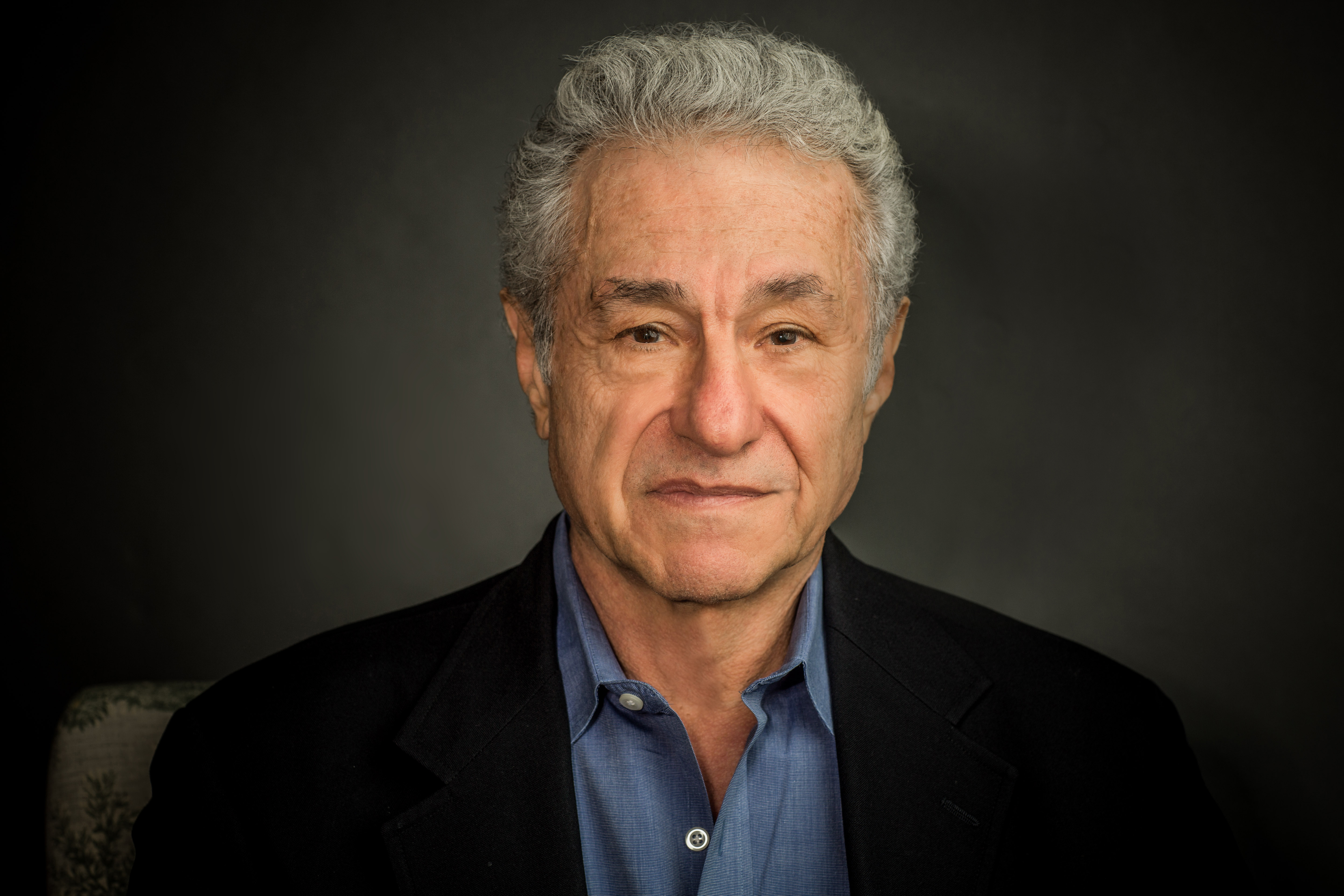
Gar Alperovitz

The New Economy Movement in the United States is a group of organizations that are attempting to restructure the current economic system. The movement prioritizes human well-being over economic growth. Its primary goal is to localize the economy in an attempt to spread wealth and promote sustainable business practices. The New Economy movement challenges both neoclassical and Keynesian economics to include theories of ecological economics, solidarity economy, commons, degrowth, systems thinking and Buddhist economics. The movement promotes more public ownership of the economy through organizational structures such as cooperatives, and state-owned banks. The goal of these changes is to remove or alleviate harmful environmental and social impacts of capitalism through alternative economic as well as political practices. A principal leader of the movement is the political economist and activist Gar Alperowitz, who, with others, promote the democratizing ownership of businesses and the economy as a means to achieve a sustainable, fair, and equal society.

== Origins ==
The New Economy movement is a rather disparate and wide-ranging collective, whose goals range from creating more environmentally sustainable community practices, such as food co-ops, to redistributing wealth, as seen in the Occupy movement.

The New Economy movement resulted from a sense of disillusionment with the current American political economy system. Some New Economy issues have beginnings in wealth disparity, such as lack of living wages, the Great Recession economic crisis, and the consolidation of wealth. The movement also attempts to tackle social inequalities, such as an increasing prison population, brought on by the increasing privatization of the United States. Other issues have origins in environmental challenges, including the rise of global warming, and resource degradation, such as overfishing.

== Beliefs ==
Those who advocate democratization of ownership and other economic changes base their advocacy on a belief in the failures of capitalism in the United States. Due to these changes, members of the New economy movement advocate a rapid transition to new economic practices that are based on resource conservation, human happiness as a metric of success, and strong local communities. Many New Economy organizations and activists maintain that issues such as Women's rights, Civil rights and the Environment, have connected causes and require fundamental change in politics and the economy.

== Institutions ==
Many institutions have shifted from the orthodox corporate emphasis of profit and economic growth to a more progressive egalitarian and environmentally friendly business model.

Most of these work in an Employee Stock Ownership Plan (ESOP). Currently there are more than 11,000 companies owned entirely or in significant part by some 13 million employees. The following is a chart of the largest 10 companies in the United States that operate an ESOP or other New Economy Movement based system:

Rank	Company	City	State	Plan	Plan Start Date	Business	Employees
1	Publix Super Markets	Lakeland	FL	ESOP	1974	Supermarkets	182,500
2	Lifetouch	Eden Prairie	MN	ESOP	1977	Photography	21,000
3	Penmac	Springfield	MO	ESOP	2010	Staffing	20,420
4	CH2M Hill	Englewood	CO	Stock Incentive & Purchase Plan	2000	Engineering & Construction	20,000
5	Houchens Industries	Bowling Green	KY	ESOP	1961	Supermarkets & other services	18,000
6	Amsted Industries	Chicago	IL	ESOP	1986	Industrial Components	17,000
7	WinCo Foods	Boise	ID	ESOP	1985	Supermarkets	15,200
8	Alliance Holdings	Abington	PA	ESOP	1985	Holding Company	14,700
9	Parsons	Pasadena	CA	ESOP	1974	Engineering and Construction	14,000
10	Black and Veatch	Overland Park	KS	ESOP	1974	Engineering	13,350

Seventh Generation, a company dedicated to producing 'green' household products has policies requiring that no one be paid more than fourteen times the lowest base pay or five times higher than the average employee.

Many New Economy business models are classified as benefit corporations in the 30 U.S. states and the District of Columbia that allow such classification. A benefit corporation is a for-profit corporate entity that allows for public benefit as a charter purpose in addition to the traditional corporate goal of maximizing profit for shareholders. As a requirement for this classification, corporations must expand the obligations of boards, requiring them to consider environmental and social factors as well as the financial interests of shareholders.

130 million Americans already belong to a cooperative organization, the most common of which is the credit union.

=== Food Cooperatives ===
Food Cooperatives are a part of the New Economy movement and consist of farms focused on giving back to their community with a sharp focus on local farming and economy. Many are nonprofit organizations. Cooperatives follow sustainable farming practices to avoid damage of natural ecosystems. These farms support their communities by donating any unused/unsold crops to local members or organizations in need.

== Challenges ==
One challenge facing the movement is that the language used to talk about it holds negative connotations for many Americans. According to Gar Alperovitz, the idea of democratic ownership is new to many, and for others it conjures up images of authoritarian "communist" societies. Members of the New Economy movement perceive advocacy as being fundamentally challenged by a prevailing attitude of dismissal or ignorance towards alternative systems of economics, and common framings of any alternative as based in socialism. New Economy activists hold that the current model of American capitalism is so deeply ingrained in society that a shift to an alternative economic model would be met with resistance from corporations and wealthier individuals. In the United States, there is strong resistance to reducing or eliminating economic growth. Members of the movement believe that in order to avoid resource depletion and exacerbation of climate change, economic growth must be drastically reduced, which alienates the movement from many potential supporters. For example, labor unions are often at the core of similar social movements, yet they are reliant on economic growth in order to keep their members from losing their jobs. These factors present the New Economy movement with significant challenges in finding substantial support for their aims.

== See also ==
- Anti-capitalism
- Back-to-the-land movement
- Business ethics
- Criticism of capitalism
- Eco-communalism
- Economic democracy
- Ecovillage
- Great Transition
- Market failure
- Peer production
- Post-capitalism
- Post-scarcity economy
- Sharing economy
