= Ty Bollinger =

American alternative medicine advocate

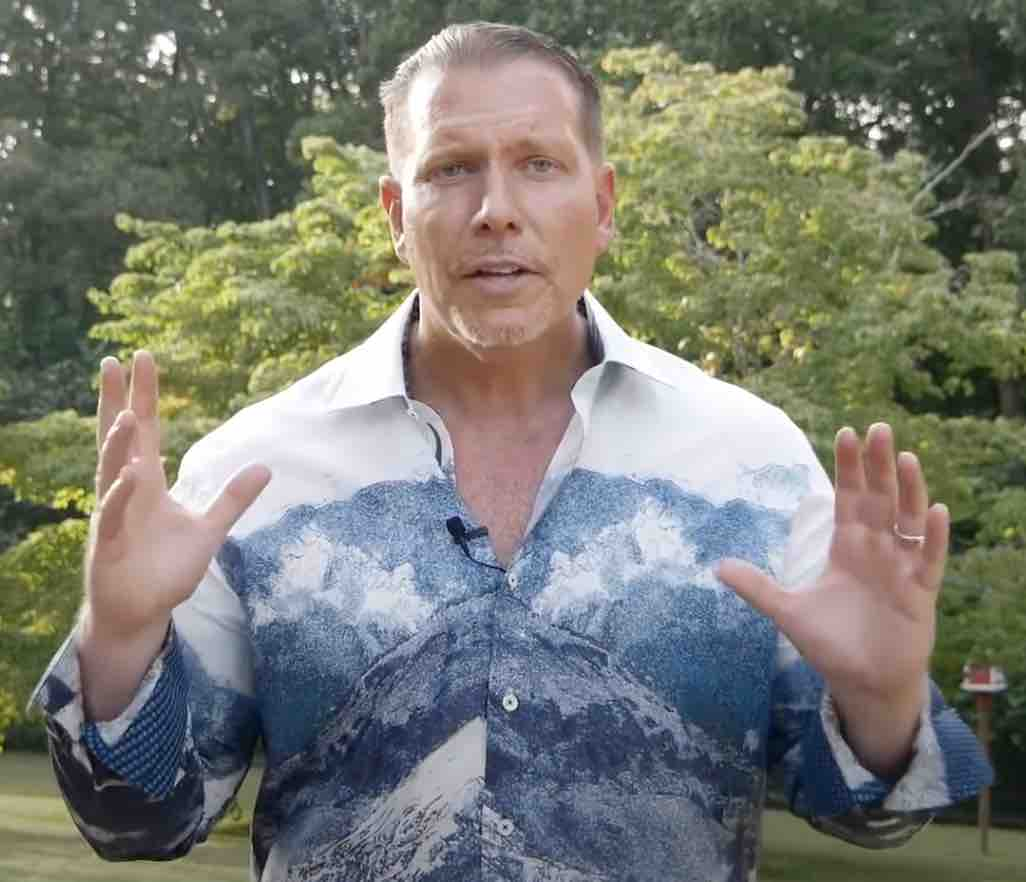
- Born: 1968 (age 57–58)
- Occupations: Alternative medicine activist, writer
- Spouse: Charlene Bolinger (m. 1996)

Ty Bollinger (born January 19, 1968) is an American author and conspiracy theorist who disseminates misinformation about cancer treatments, anti-vaccine conspiracy theories, unproven cures, alternative medicine treatments for cancer and vaccine-preventable diseases. Although Bollinger refers to himself as a medical researcher he has no medical training. Bollinger runs the website The Truth About Cancer and its associated social media accounts, where he sells books, videos, and nutritional supplements. He has also spoken at "Stop the Steal" rallies.

== Background ==
Bollinger is a former bodybuilder. He is a Certified Public Accountant with degrees in accounting and taxation from Baylor University. When he was newly married and five years into his accounting career in Texas, his father died of cancer at age 52. Cancer took five more of Bollinger's family, culminating in his mother's death to the disease in 2004. Bollinger rejects the suggestion that he is anti-chemotherapy, but that he is a right-to-choose advocate.

== The Truth About Cancer ==
Bollinger's website, The Truth About Cancer, was established in 2014. It promotes the idea that chemotherapy does not cure cancer. The website is a merchandising platform for their instructional videos, food supplements, alternative health books, and treatments. Their videos have been viewed millions of times and is part of what has been called a "disinformation industry."

The Truth about Cancer videos present pseudoscientific treatments to remove toxins from the body, an approach discredited by scientists who have studied the method. In the videos, Bollinger warns that cancer, autoimmune diseases, cardiovascular disease, diabetes, degenerative brain diseases like Alzheimer’s and dementia, hair loss, skin outbreaks, unwanted weight gain, depression, and fatigue are caused by toxins in the body.

The website has strong commercial ties to other companies that use false or misleading information to sell products and to anti-vaccination groups. The Bollingers have said they paid $12 million to partner groups such as Children's Health Defense for website customer referrals, a practice known as affiliate marketing. This type of commercial alliance between companies and groups spreading conspiracy theories to sell products and information packages has been dubbed a "disinformation industry" by Professor Dorit Reiss. Top sellers for Bollinger's The Truth About Vaccines include prominent anti-vaccination promoters, including Sayer Ji, Robert F. Kennedy Jr., Rashid Buttar, Michael Adams and Sherri Tenpenny.

Bollinger has a history of promoting unproven or disproven cancer treatments. One of his highly circulated 2017 videos features the viral treatment known under the name of Rigvir, which originated in a Latvian laboratory. The treatment was subsequently taken off the market by the Latvian health authority, as the company could not present results of human studies to prove efficacy after it was found the doses sold contained a number of viruses that was greatly inferior to what was indicated on the packaging. Ty Bollinger promoted lycopene as a medication reducing the risk of developing several types of cancer in 2018, when extensive studies concluded as early as 2007 that it does not prevent cancer.

Bollinger associated himself with osteopathic physician and conspiracy theorist Rashid Buttar to sell subscriptions to an organization (the International Association for a Disease-Free World) that appears to exist solely as a marketing device for doubtful cures sold by Buttar. Bollinger explains most of the website is accessible to paying members only, to discourage law enforcement officials and public health authorities from looking into the medical claims made about the products.

He was involved in the case of Cassandra Callender, a young woman who refused chemotherapy treatment for Hodgkin lymphoma in 2015. In this rare case, the Connecticut Supreme Court ordered that the life-saving treatment be administered against the will of Callender and her mother. In one of his Truth about Cancer videos, Bollinger is seen coaching Callender on how to delay the medical treatments until she reaches legal age and arranging alternative medicine treatments for her cancer. Callender did stop her treatments when she turned 18 and went to an alternative medicine clinic in Mexico where she received ineffective treatments. She eventually returned to the United States to undergo chemotherapy when her cancer returned but died in 2020.

== Anti-vaccination and COVID-19 ==
Bollinger also branched out into anti-vaccination, selling a new video series, The Truth about Vaccines from their website, with a supporting Facebook group. The videos feature interviews and commentary by several leaders of the American anti-vaccination movement, such as Children's Health Defense's Robert F. Kennedy Jr., Sherri Tenpenny, Andrew Wakefield, Barbara Loe Fisher, Del Bigtree, Sayer Ji, Joseph Mercola, and Rashid Buttar.

In 2020, the Bollingers' social media accounts had a combined reach of 3.5 million followers. In addition to promoting their merchandise and theories about cancer, they have been using their social media presence to promote misinformation about vaccines, including anti-government conspiracy theories common to the anti-vaccination movement. The newsletter they distribute to their paying customers promotes several of the major players in the anti-vaccination movement.

The Bollingers' company, TTAC Publishing, received two COVID-19 rescue loans from the federal government: in May 2020, when they stated they had 16 employees, and in February 2021 when they listed 27 employees.

In May 2021, YouTube suspended the Bollingers' Truth About Vaccines channel, as part of the platform's efforts to reduce the spread of COVID-19 misinformation. The channel boasted some 75,000 subscribers, with one video featuring Kennedy getting more than a million views. Their channel The Truth About Cancer was not impacted by the ban.

Bollinger frequently repeats claims from anti-vaccination activists. A study by NewsGuard ranks the Bollingers' Facebook page as one of the largest superspreaders of COVID-19 misinformation as of April 2020. The study found the page repeated many of the common COVID-19 false claims, including that the pandemic was planned, that the virus was built in a laboratory, and that COVID-19 is transmitted by 5G wireless technology. All of these claims have been debunked by public health units and independent medical researchers. Another analysis of Twitter and Facebook anti-vaccine content, in March 2021, found the Bollingers' to be one of 12 individual and organization accounts producing up to 65% of all anti-vaccine content on the platforms.

== Stop the Steal ==
Bollinger spoke at a "Stop the Steal" rally in Nashville on November 14, 2020, repeating accusations of election fraud. Such allegations of fraud were rejected by the courts due to lack of evidence, the suits being frequently characterized as being frivolous and without merit. He also spoke at a protest staged by pastor Greg Locke on November 23, 2020, against new restrictions imposed in Nashville to limit the spread of COVID-19. Bollinger encouraged protestors to ignore the measures put in place by Mayor John Cooper, telling them: "These codes are not laws, so they are not enforceable."

The couple played a significant role in organizing the pro-Trump demonstrations that culminated in a riot at the United States Capitol on January 6, 2021. They coordinated with leaders of the Stop the Steal movement to bring their supporters to the demonstrations. They introduced speakers to their crowd of supporters and according to Darlene, Ty joined the demonstration outside the Capitol; both afterward condemned the violence that took place at the event. The Bollingers have been using QAnon hashtags in 2020 and promoted some of the movement's common conspiracy theories.

Bollinger has appeared as part of the ReAwaken America tour, a political protest movement centered on opposition to COVID-19 mitigation measures and in favor of the conspiracy theory that the 2020 presidential election was stolen from Donald Trump.

== Personal ==
Bollinger lives in Nashville, Tennessee with his wife, Charlene, and their four children.
