= Kelly Brogan =

American psychiatrist and alternative medicine practitioner

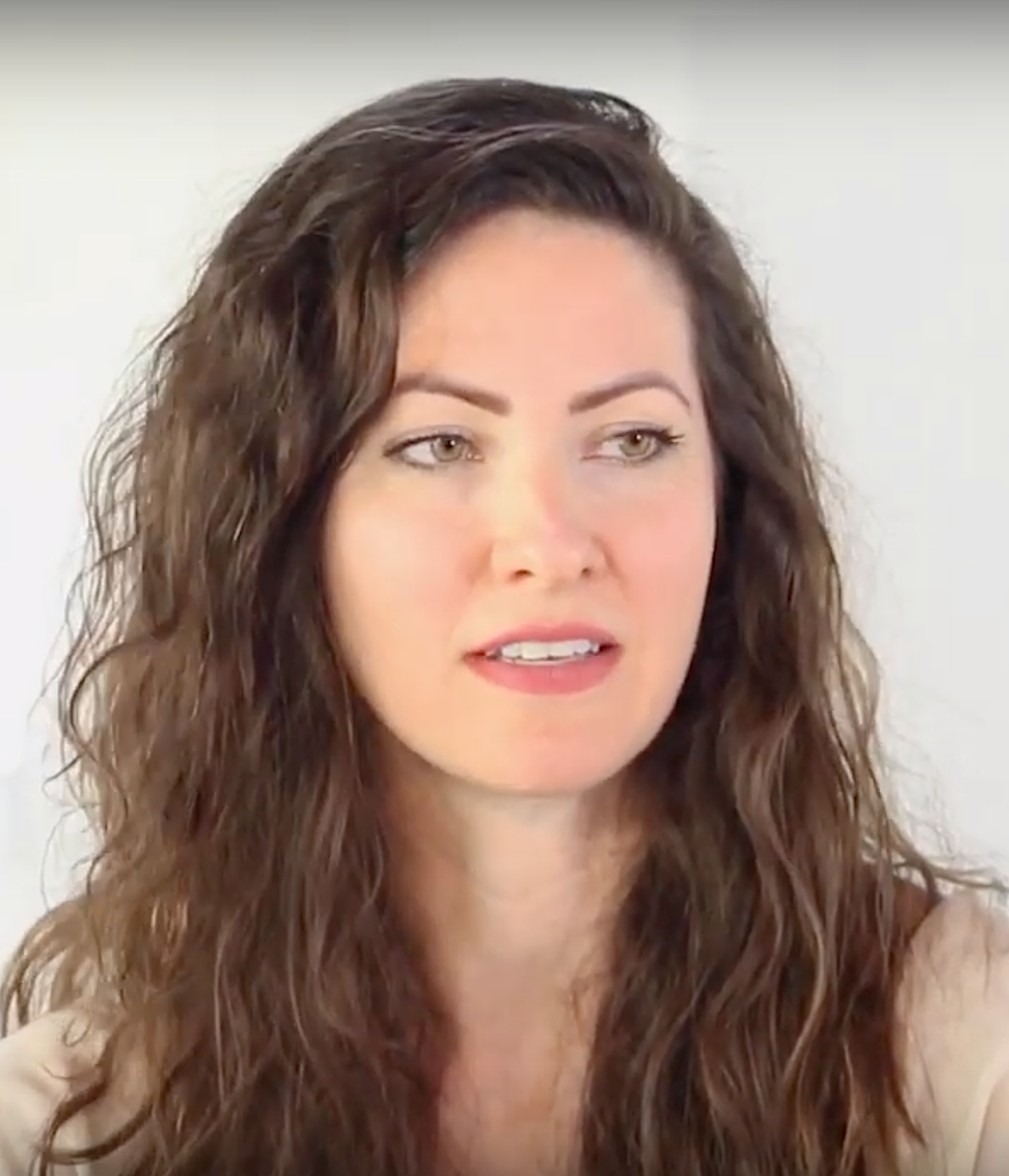
- Brogan in 2019
- Occupation: Alternative medicine practitioner
- Notable work: A Mind of Your Own: The Truth About Depression and How Women Can Heal Their Bodies to Reclaim Their Lives
- Spouses: Andrew Fink (m. 2006; div. 2018) Sayer Ji (m. 2019; div. 2022)
- Website: kellybroganmd.com

Kelly Brogan is an American author of books on alternative medicine who has promoted conspiracy theories and misinformation about medical hypotheses.

== Background and credentials ==
Brogan graduated from Cornell University Medical College, and has a B.S. in Systems Neuroscience from MIT. She uses the title of "holistic psychiatrist".

Brogan maintained a psychiatry practice in Manhattan from 2009 to 2019, specializing in helping people wean themselves off medication. Peter M. Heimlich stated that she appears not to have maintained certification with the American Board of Psychiatry and Neurology, according to the association's database. She no longer claims to be certified in psychiatry and psychosomatic medicine on her website.

Brogan wrote about health on Gwyneth Paltrow's Goop retail website and was featured on expert panels at several Goop events.

== Alternative medicine controversies ==
Brogan promotes the belief that human diseases are caused not by infectious agents, but rather by psychological factors. She mocks the well-established notion of "little invisible pathogens, you know, that randomly jump around from person to person".

In a similar vein, Brogan attributed the death of AIDS patients not to HIV, but to treatments meant to fight it. Even though the link between HIV and AIDS is clearly established by medical research, she calls it an "assumption". She also defended the unsupported belief that a dysbiosis (imbalance) of intestinal bacteria causes depression; Brogan invites people to stop taking antidepressants and use the techniques from her website instead. Through her website, Brogan offers a subscription-only "lifestyle medicine" community space and access to self-improvement training resources.

She also promotes many of the usual erroneous claims against vaccines, and despite coffee enemas being long discredited as medical procedures, Brogan promotes them as a treatment for depression.

Since 2023, she has been hosting a wellness podcast called Reclamation radio.

== COVID-19 denialism and conspiracies ==
An analysis of Twitter and Facebook anti-vaccine content found Brogan to be one of 12 individual and organization accounts producing up to 65% of all anti-vaccine content on the platforms. She has promoted widely disproven conspiracy theories about masks not preventing the spread of COVID-19, questioning the existence of a coronavirus causing COVID-19, and conspiracy theories about the COVID-19 pandemic being planned.

Brogan indicated at length that, in her opinion, the virus may not exist. According to her, it's rather the fear of a virus that makes people sick and die. She referred her followers to the pseudoscientific claims of Joseph Mercola and Ryke Geerd Hamer on the topic. Twitter, Facebook, Vimeo and Instagram removed Brogan's videos, as part of their efforts to limit the spread of misinformation during the epidemic, actions Brogan described as "censorship".

Brogan's claims about the cause of diseases, like Hamer's and Mercola's claims, have been debunked by medical experts as dangerous misconceptions.

On that occasion and others prior, she accused the government of being controlled by pro-vaccination "elites" with a sinister agenda. She suggested the pandemic was a ploy by the United States government to force vaccination on people and usher in totalitarian measures. Investigator Benjamin Radford attributes Brogan's theories to a wider phenomenon of self-styled populist health experts inciting people to reject science and embrace their own theories.

== Personal life ==
Brogan lives in Florida, and has two children.

== Bibliography ==
- Brogan, Kelly (2024). The Reclaimed Woman: Love Your Shadow, Embody Your Feminine Gifts, Experience the Specific Pleasure of Who You Are. Skyhorse. ISBN 978-1510780705.
- Brogan, Kelly (2019). Own Your Self: The Surprising Path beyond Depression, Anxiety, and Fatigue to Reclaiming Your Authenticity, Vitality, and Freedom. Hay House. p. 352. ISBN 978-1401956820.
- Brogan, Kelly (2016). A Mind of Your Own: The Truth About Depression and How Women Can Heal Their Bodies to Reclaim Their Lives. Harper Wave. p. 352. ISBN 978-0062405579. On the New York Times' list of best-selling books.
- (as editor) Greenblatt, James; Brogan, Kelly, eds. (2015). Integrative Therapies for Depression: Redefining Models for Assessment, Treatment and Prevention. CRC Press. p. 531. ISBN 978-1498702294.

== See also ==
- America's Frontline Doctors
- Children's Health Defense
- COVID-19 misinformation
- COVID-19 misinformation by governments
- List of conspiracy theories
- List of unproven methods against COVID-19
- Plandemic
- ScienceUpFirst, a Canadian science communication campaign focusing on the pandemic
