= Christiane Northrup =

Obstetrician-gynecologist who promotes anti-vaccine and medical pseudoscience

- Born: Buffalo, New York
- Education: Geisel School of Medicine
- Occupations: Obstetrics and Gynecology
- Years active: 1975–present
- Known for: Women's health, advocacy of alternative medicine and conspiracy theories

Christiane Northrup is a former obstetrics and gynaecology physician and author who promotes pseudoscientific alternative medicine and anti-vaccine conspiracy theories. She has a history of opposing vaccination and has embraced QAnon ideology during the COVID-19 pandemic. Northrup reaches a significant audience through popular books and multiple social media platforms and spreads misinformation, notably about COVID-19.

== Early life ==
Northrup is a native of Ellicottville, New York. Her father worked as a dentist. When Northrup was five years old, her six-month-old brother died after being admitted to the hospital. Another brother was born and refused to eat, but her mother brought the boy home against medical advice. Her mother insisted she knew he would be okay. Northrup calls this "intact maternal intuition" and believes that these early childhood incidents resulted in her current medical beliefs.

Northrup earned her Doctor of Medicine (M.D.) degree at Dartmouth Medical School and completed her obstetrics and gynecology (OB/GYN) residency at Tufts-New England Medical Center in Boston.

== Career ==
Sixteen years after starting her practice in 1980, Northrup co-founded the private obstetrics and gynaecology practice Women to Women in Yarmouth, Maine in 1996. The practice incorporated holistic and Western medicine. Northrup was also an assistant clinical professor of OB/GYN at Maine Medical Center for 20 years and is credited with helping promote the women's health movement in the state.

Northrup originally became known after writing New York Times best-selling books such as Women’s Bodies, Women’s Wisdom, which has been translated into sixteen languages, and The Wisdom of Menopause. She was a regular guest on The Oprah Winfrey Show and The Dr. Oz Show, appearing as a women's health expert. She has appeared as a guest on Today, Rachel Ray Show, The View and 20/20. In 2013 she was named one of Reader's Digest 100 most trusted people in America. She wrote over twenty articles for the Huffington Post between 2011 and 2014, writes a regular newsletter and has a website. She appeared on Winfrey's podcast as recently as August 2020.

Northrup left Women to Women in 1997 and retired from her OB/GYN practice in Yarmouth in 1999 to focus on writing and speaking. She voluntarily withdrew her medical license in 2015.

Northrup is a member of the American Holistic Medical Association, a pseudo-medical professional association.

Northrup has many followers on social media. As of November 2020, she has over 110,000 followers on Twitter. As of January 2021 she has over 149,000 followers on Instagram and over half a million followers on Facebook.

== Views and controversy ==
Northrup advocates for not using terms such as "aging" and "senior moments", to keep moving and to take pleasure in living. She said, in 2016, when asked about her age, "my biological age is 33. My wisdom age is 300". She recommends regular workouts, such as Pilates, to prevent aches and stiffness common in aging. In 2016 Northrup decided to post a vlog every day about what she was grateful for, stating that staying positive can be a difficult discipline but becomes a reward that changes the brain. She recommends training yourself to notice blessings, then you will feel more blessed.

Science-based medicine advocate David Gorski describes Northrup as "...a woo-friendly gynecologist who has some very strange views about the vagina...". She believes that qi gong will cure many female health issues, increase the qi to the vagina and provide better orgasms.

Northrup has admitted to using Tarot cards to diagnose her own illnesses.

Northrup claims that trauma from a past life can cause chronic illness.

Northrup believes that the term "conspiracy theorist" was coined by the CIA, which she also claims is run out of China. She also contends that the term "anti-vaxxer" was created by Big Pharma.

She believes that in a previous incarnation, she lived in Atlantis and predicted that December 21, 2020, would be the beginning of the "...Age of Aquarius, delivering the world from evil and allowing us to evolve into a new species, Homo illuminus". When this date passed, she adapted and changed her narrative to recommending having positive thoughts.

Northrup does not believe in germ theory, and states that the reason college students get sick with illnesses such as meningitis is that they are run down and have a "...shaky first chakra".

Northrup promotes alternative medical therapies and connections between the soul and body. She believes the regular medical establishment overlook these connections.

Northrup wrote in one of her books and reiterated on The Oprah Winfrey Show in 2009 that thyroid problems in women "...develop because of an energy blockage in the throat region, the result of a lifetime of 'swallowing' words one is aching to say." She advised taking iodine supplements to help with the condition. According to Dr. David Cooper, professor of endocrinology at Johns Hopkins School of Medicine, this is bad advice since the thyroid gland is very sensitive to iodine and it will make hypothyroidism worse.

In 2008, medical doctor Harriet Hall expressed how appalled she was at the information she read in Northrup's third book The Wisdom of Menopause. In the book Northrup supports the idea of "seven emotional centers" that correspond roughly to the seven chakras, and references her belief in astrology, angels, mysticism, feng shui, and Tarot cards. Medical information is mixed with ideas that are not supported with credible evidence: While providing excellent advice on how to treat insomnia, such as avoiding caffeine and exercising regularly, she adds the recommendation to cover bedroom mirrors at night. According to feng shui, mirrors enliven a room and increase the energy flow, making people feel unsafe and jumpy at night. She recommends non-standard laboratory testing from Genova Diagnostics, which consumer protection site Quackwatch advises people to avoid. Northrup recommends large doses of vitamin A to prevent heart disease. According to Hall, this has been linked to increased incidence of lung cancer, hip fractures in menopausal women, birth defects when taken in early pregnancy, and an increase in total mortality. Northrup believes that a woman's "emotional style" influences her risk of developing breast cancer and her ability to recover from it. She stresses empowerment and positive thinking, which Hall considers to be idealistic. Hall thinks that "MDs who recommend quackery along with legitimate medical advice are arguably more dangerous than outright quacks because people are more likely to take them seriously."

Northrup subscribes to the idea that male circumcision causes dyspareunia. Jen Gunter, an obstetrician-gynecologist known for exposing medical pseudoscience, stated in 2011 that this is biologically implausible. Gunter has seen many men who are wracked with guilt thinking they have caused their partner's condition.

In a May 2020 interview on the QAnon FAQ podcast, Northrup credits Maine's 2019 law eliminating religious and philosophical exemptions for childhood vaccinations with "galvanizing" her to speak out further against vaccines and policies surrounding them.

=== COVID-19 ===
Beginning in the spring of 2020, Northrup began posting messages opposing contact tracing, vaccine development, and masking as efforts to curb the spread of COVID-19 in addition to her more traditional medical advice. On Facebook, she began hosting a series of ten-minute videos titled "Great Awakening" in which she denies the existence of COVID-19. The videos suggest that vaccines are unnecessary if a person is healthy and will instead "...target specific chromosomes that act as the seat of our empathy", a claim with no scientific basis. Northrup further claims that COVID-19 vaccines contain artificial intelligence that integrates into the DNA of the recipient and therefore makes recipients property of the vaccine patent holders. In an October 2020 video interview, she explained her belief that COVID-19 vaccines would also insert two-way 5G radio nanoparticle robots into the vaccine recipients in order to collect and communicate extensive biometric data that would be connected to cryptocurrency, making humans "slaves to the system". She explained that the robots would be permanent and would enable people to be controlled by outside forces.

On the cover of their April 2020 issue, Maine Women Magazine featured a puff piece on Northrup, causing magazine advertiser Coffee By Design to pull their ad and issue a statement expressing their discontent that the piece failed to address Northrup's anti-vaccine stance or her public statements that COVID-19 is a hoax. Northrup responded saying she did not think that COVID-19 was a hoax, just that it was being misrepresented by the media.

Northrup is credited with contributing significantly to the initial online spread of the COVID-19 conspiracy theory film Plandemic, which was released in early May 2020. Northrup shared the film on Facebook the following day, and it was re-shared by over 1000 of her followers, many of whom posted it to large anti-vaccine groups on Facebook.

Northrup continued using social media to promote disproven theories about COVID throughout 2020: She claimed that Canada was building COVID-19 concentration camps; that asymptomatic carriers of COVID-19 do not spread the disease; that masks are harmful to the wearer's health; that vaccines against COVID-19 affect women's fertility and menstrual cycles; that the 2020 election was stolen from Donald Trump; that global public health leaders created the COVID-19 pandemic to enact genocide and to cull, track and control the human race; and that Ukraine harbours several laboratories producing viruses on an industrial scale. In April 2021, Northrup used her Facebook page to praise Centner Academy in Miami, where some of her grandchildren attended school, for prohibiting teachers who receive COVID-19 vaccinations from being in the classroom.

In early 2021 the Center for Countering Digital Hate (CCDH) released a report titled The Disinformation Dozen, which exposed that that two-thirds (65%) of anti-vaccine content including misinformation and outright lies, shared or posted on social media could be attributed to just twelve individuals, Northrup was listed as one of these individuals.

On April 16, 2021, Northrup spoke at the Health and Freedom Conference hosted by Rhema Bible Training College in Tulsa, Oklahoma. In her 20-minute speech, she claimed that COVID vaccines are ineffective against the virus but would cause widespread sterility in humans; that vaccinated mothers who breastfeed could kill their babies; that vaccinated people are a health risk to those who are not vaccinated; that people should not wear masks, and that the Bill & Melinda Gates Foundation is collecting physiological information via COVID vaccines, cell phones and cryptocurrency.

=== QAnon ===
According to Nathan Bernard and Andy O'Brian in an article for the Mainer titled Dr. No, "[Northrup's] aligned herself with a loose network of crackpots and charlatans who profit off people’s fears, and is promoting their projects and products, along with her own, to her massive online audience using cult-like techniques." Bernard and O'Brian declare that Northrup has been leading her supporters down the QAnon rabbit hole, talking about the group frequently in her videos and has been a contributor to spreading conspirituality, (a portmanteau of the words conspiracy and spirituality that was coined in 2011). Beginning in March 2020, Northrup posted links to QAnon-related memes and videos such as Out of the Shadows which talks about QAnon ideology, and she often included the QAnon-affiliated #savethechildren hashtag with her posts. The title of her video series, The Great Awakening is known to be linked to the QAnon movement. Northrop emceed conspiracy theorist Robert David Steele's "Arise USA: The Resurrection Tour", which made stops throughout the United States during the summer of 2021 and promoted several QAnon and QAnon-adjacent theories.

=== Vaccinations ===
Northrup opposes vaccination and describes it as a cultural ritual that is imperfect and unnecessary if people have a good immune system. She stipulates that vaccines are designed to only boost the first chakra, a view which has no foundation in science. Regarding pertussis (whooping cough), she recommends breastfeeding to support a baby's immune system, claiming the vaccine for this disease is not reliable and possibly unnecessary. Medical Doctor Peter Lipson, in his article "Christiane Northrup: more bad medicine", expresses his concern, admitting that although vaccines are imperfect they do offer protection against potentially horrifying disease; in the case of whooping cough, they offer protection against an asphyxiating death. As early as 2006, Northrup has spoken out against Gardasil and encouraging parents not to give it to their children.

When an audience member of The Oprah Winfrey Show asked Northrup about the HPV vaccine, Northrup advised against it despite evidence that it is safe and protects against a virus linked to cervical cancer. Instead, she recommended a dietary program to build immunity. According to Susan Wood, a research professor at the School of Public Health at George Washington University, there is no evidence that diet can stop the spread of HPV. Jen Gunter is also critical of Northrup for her HPV opinion, noting that while Northrup has not published one paper in support of her ideas, the researcher who made the connection between the HPV and cervical cancer won a Nobel Prize.

Northrup was an outspoken advocate of failed efforts in 2019 to expand the exemptions to student vaccination requirements in Maine and was a leader of the people's veto movement, opposing the elimination of religious and philosophical exemptions to vaccinations, which appeared as a statewide ballot referendum in 2020. Regarding mandatory flu shots for health care workers in Maine Northrup is "...adamantly opposed to the Maine CDC rule change to mandate flu vaccines for healthcare workers."

=== Breast thermography ===
David Gorski, a surgical oncologist, states in his article, "Oprah’s buddy Dr. Christiane Northrup and breast thermography: The opportunistic promotion of quackery" that Northrup advocates for "...ways to prevent breast cancer at the cellular level..." using thermography. She makes the claim that current medical professionals focus more on testing and poking and prodding. Gorski calls this a typical "alt-med" trope. He explains that thermography is just another test and is not preventative in any way. Northrup claims that using thermography, breast cancer can be diagnosed from eight to ten years earlier and produces unambiguous results, reducing further testing. However, according to Gorski, studies show that thermography is unreliable. A study in 1977 showed it to be the least effective of the existing screening modalities in finding breast cancers. Northrup cites a study from 1982 in her written articles about the topic, despite many more recent studies showing its ineffectiveness. Gorski believes Northrup is guilty of malpractice when she encourages patients who believe they have healthy breasts to forego mammograms, even if this is against the advice of their doctors. Gorski has encountered many women in his practice who resisted their doctor's request for testing because they "knew they were fine" only to find they had invasive cancers. Gorski concludes that science does not support the use of thermography instead of mammography.

== Personal life ==
In 1999, Northrup and her husband divorced. She has two daughters and lives in Yarmouth, Maine. In March and April 2020, she was the primary caregiver for her terminally ill boyfriend, who died on April 21.

== Publications ==
- — (1994). Women's Bodies, Women's Wisdom. United States: Bantam. ISBN 9780553081206.
- — (2001). Wisdom of Menopause. United States: Little Brown Book Group Limited. ISBN 9780356248981.
- — (2006). Mother-Daughter Wisdom: Understanding the Crucial Link Between Mothers, Daughters, and Health. New York: Bantam Books. ISBN 9780553380125.
- — (2015). Goddesses Don't Age: The Secret Prescription for Radiance, Vitality, and Well-Being. United States: Hay House. ISBN 9781401945169.
- — (2019). Dodging Energy Vampires. United States: Hay House. ISBN 9781401954796.
