= Joseph Mercola =

American alternative medicine proponent and purveyor of anti-vaccination misinformation

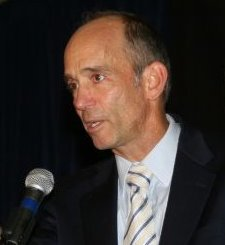
- Mercola in 2009
- Born: July 8, 1954 (age 72); Chicago, Illinois, U.S.
- Education: University of Illinois, Urbana-Champaign (BS); Midwestern University (DO)
- Partner: Erin Elizabeth
- Medical career
- Sub-specialties: Nutrition

Joseph Michael Mercola (/mərˈkoʊlə/; born July 8, 1954) is an American alternative medicine proponent, osteopathic physician, and Internet business personality. He markets largely unproven dietary supplements and medical devices. On his website, Mercola and colleagues advocate unproven and pseudoscientific alternative health notions including homeopathy and opposition to vaccination. These positions have received persistent criticism. Mercola is a member of several alternative medicine organizations as well as the political advocacy group Association of American Physicians and Surgeons, which promotes scientifically discredited views about medicine and disease. He is the author of two books.

Mercola's medical claims have been criticized by the medical, scientific, regulatory, and business communities. A 2006 BusinessWeek editorial stated his marketing practices relied on "slick promotion, clever use of information, and scare tactics". In 2005, 2006, 2011, and 2021 the U.S. Food and Drug Administration (FDA) warned Mercola and his company that they were making illegal claims for their products' ability to detect, prevent, and treat disease. Quackwatch has criticized Mercola for making "unsubstantiated claims [that] clash with those of leading medical and public health organizations and many unsubstantiated recommendations for dietary supplements". David Gorski of Science-Based Medicine says Mercola "mixes the boring, sensible health advice with pseudoscientific advice in such a way that it's hard for someone without a medical background to figure out which is which".

During the COVID-19 pandemic, Mercola spread misinformation about the virus and pseudoscientific anti-vaccine misinformation on social media platforms. Researchers have identified him as the "chief spreader of coronavirus misinformation online".

== Life and career ==
Mercola was born July 8, 1954, in Chicago, Illinois. His mother, Jeanette Aldridge (née Freeman) was a waitress and his father, Thomas Nicholas Mercola, was an Air Force veteran who worked for Marshall Field's, a department store in Chicago. Mercola attended Lane Tech College Prep High School and studied biology and chemistry at the University of Illinois, graduating in 1976. In 1982, he graduated from the Chicago College of Osteopathic Medicine (now Midwestern University). According to Mercola's website, he is a former chairman of family medicine at St. Alexius Medical Center. He stopped treating patients in 2009 to work full-time on his health products and vitamin supplements business. In a 2017 affidavit, Mercola stated that his net worth was "in excess of $100 million." Until 2013, Mercola operated the Dr. Mercola Natural Health Center (formerly the Optimal Wellness Center) in Schaumburg, Illinois.

Mercola lives in Cape Coral, Florida. Mercola and his partner Erin Elizabeth, a blogger listed by The New York Times as one of the most prolific spreaders of misinformation, have been called two of the "disinformation dozen" responsible for 65% of COVID-19 anti-vaccine misinformation on the internet and social media, according to a report by the Center for Countering Digital Hate (CCDH) in 2021.

He has written two books which have been listed on the New York Times bestseller list: The No-Grain Diet (May 2003) and The Great Bird Flu Hoax (October 2006). In the bird flu book, Mercola dismisses medical concerns over an avian influenza pandemic, asserting that the government, big business, and the mainstream media have conspired to promote the threat of avian flu to accrue money and power. Mercola has appeared on The Dr. Oz Show and The Doctors.

His business is very successful. In 2019, The Washington Post wrote he had "amassed a fortune selling natural health products, court records show, including vitamin supplements, some of which he claims are alternatives to vaccines....His net worth, derived largely from his network of private companies, has grown to 'in excess of $100 million,' he said in a 2017 affidavit." In 2023 however, executives of his company Mercola Market complained that JP Morgan closed their bank accounts. The financial institution indicated those accounts were terminated when they became aware of "multiple occasions of regulatory scrutiny, raising concerns about a pattern of deceptive business practices."

It is reported that Mercola consults a psychic medium daily, costing $1.2 million USD annually, for medical and business advice.

== Views and controversy ==
=== Website and publications ===
Mercola operates Mercola.com, which he has described as the most popular alternative-health website on the internet. Aside from the main site, it also hosts blog subsites, like Healthy Pets and Peak Fitness. Traffic counting from Quantcast shows the site receives about 1.9 million novel visitors per month, each returning almost ten times each month; the number of views is roughly equal to the number received by the National Institutes of Health. Using aggressive direct-marketing tactics, the site and his company, Mercola LLC, brought in roughly $7 million in 2010 through the sale of alternative medicine treatments and dietary supplements. The site promotes disproven health ideas, including the notions that homeopathy can treat autism and that vaccinations have hidden detriments to human health.

Phyllis Entis, a microbiologist and food safety expert, highlighted Mercola.com as an example of websites "likely to mislead consumers by offering one-sided, incomplete, inaccurate, or misleading information."

Researchers say that Mercola employs teams in Florida and the Philippines who translate his posts into multiple languages and then post them to groups of websites and social media accounts.

In August 2021, Mercola announced on his website that he would permanently remove all of his articles, but he would continue to post articles daily, which would be deleted after 48 hours. Rachel E. Moran, a conspiracy theory researcher at the University of Washington said that this announcement was "[Mercola] trying to come up with his own strategies of avoiding his content being taken down, while also playing up this martyrdom of being an influential figure in the movement who keeps being targeted."

=== Anti-vaccine views ===
Mercola is a critic of vaccines and vaccination policy, claiming that too many vaccines are given too soon during infancy. He hosts anti-vaccination activists on his website, advocates other measures rather than vaccination in many cases such as using vitamin D rather than a flu shot and strongly criticizes influenza vaccines. Mercola is viewed as an anti-vaccine propagandist. As of 2019, he has donated at least $4 million to anti-vaccine groups though his Natural Health Research Foundation, including more than $2.9 million to the anti-vaccination group the National Vaccine Information Center, amounting to about 40 percent of that organization's funding. He co-funded an anti-vaccination ad in Times Square in 2011.

Mercola has asserted that thimerosal, a vaccine preservative, is harmful due to its mercury content. Thimerosal has been removed from most vaccines given to young children in the U.S., with no effect on rates of autism diagnosis. Extensive evidence has accumulated since 1999 showing that this preservative is safe, with the World Health Organization stating in 2006 that "there is no evidence of toxicity in infants, children or adults exposed to thimerosal in vaccines."

Using web browsing data collected between 2016 and 2019, one study found that Mercola's web site had the highest number of visits among a group of sites with vaccine-skeptical content.

In March 2021, an analysis of Twitter and Facebook anti-vaccine content found Mercola's to be one of 12 individual and organization accounts producing up to 65% of all anti-vaccine content on the platforms. As of June 2021, his various social media channels accounted for a total audience exceeding 4.1 million followers.

=== COVID-19 misinformation ===
In 2020, Mercola was one of the partners in a website called "Stop Covid Cold" offering advice to the public on preventing and treating COVID-19 with alternative remedies. The website includes links to Mercola's online store and puts a strong emphasis on vitamin D supplements, despite a lack of scientific evidence pointing to the effectiveness of such a treatment. The website was taken down in April 2021 after the Food and Drug Administration sent a warning letter. In May 2021, Mercola announced he would remove mentions of COVID-19 from his websites, blaming Bill Gates and "big pharma".

Mercola claimed that inhaling 0.5–3% hydrogen peroxide solution using a nebulizer could prevent or cure COVID-19. A tweet from Mercola advertising this method was removed from Twitter on April 15, 2020, for violating the platform rules, but he continued to make these claims on other platforms, including during a speech at a major conference of anti-vaccination activists in October.

He was warned by the US Food and Drug Administration (FDA) in February 2021 for selling fake COVID-19 cures. In March, the Center for Countering Digital Hate named Mercola as one of the 12 most prominent sources of COVID misinformation in a report later cited by US Surgeon General Vivek Murthy. In September his accounts on YouTube were removed by the company for breaking their policies on COVID-19 misinformation. Mercola then moved some of his content to Substack. According to Imran Ahmed, CEO of the Center for Countering Digital Hate, Mercola's content is "so bad no one else will host it".

A lawsuit filed by Mercola in September 2022 against the removal of videos from YouTube was dismissed one year later. Mercola argued that Google, who owns YouTube, violated their provision of giving users an opportunity to remove any of their content to comply with a new policy and asked for $75,000 in damages. The court ruled the video platform was "under no obligation to host" his content after his channel was terminated in 2021 and that "YouTube had the discretion to take down content that harmed its users".

Mercola co-authored a book with Ronnie Cummins, the founder of the Organic Consumers Association, titled The Truth About COVID-19: Exposing the Great Reset, Lockdowns, Vaccine Passports, and the New Normal: Why We Must Unite in a Global Movement for Health and Freedom. The McGill Office for Science and Society described the book as "in effect, summarizing the misinformation surrounding COVID-19" and "monumentally wrong". Senator Elizabeth Warren wrote to Amazon demanding they do more to tackle misinformation about COVID-19 and stop promoting Mercola's book as a bestseller.

Mercola was cited in a February 2022 Stanford University report along with Robert W. Malone and Simone Gold, as prominent pseudomedical influencers (PMIs) who were among the top spreaders of COVID-19 misinformation. Using a number of social media accounts, including WhatsApp, Telegram, BitChute and Facebook accounts in both English and Spanish, Mercola's followers numbered over 4 million. The Virality project listed 30 incidents of Mercola spreading misinformation. Amazon gave his book The Truth About COVID-19 a prominent placement on their site. His July 10, 2021 video, which garnered over 95 thousand views, said that the COVID-19 vaccine was an "experimental gene therapy" that would destroy millions of lives. The report described how Mercola and other PMIs "commonly use manipulated statistics and hard-to verify data as the backbone of their mis- and disinformation." One example they used was the way in which Mercola decontextualized the results of a Washington University study that said that people who have had a mild case of COVID-19 may have a lasting antibody protection, to claim that vaccine manufacturers had claimed otherwise and this was bad news for them.

Mercola participated in an online fundraising event to support the presidential campaign of Robert F. Kennedy Jr., along with several other prominent anti-vaccination activists.

=== Other views ===
Other views Mercola supports include:

- Dietary recommendations on food consumption that often put him at odds with mainstream dietary advice.
- Advocacy on the labeling and health of genetically modified food, as well as for their elimination entirely from the market.
- Claims that microwaving food alters its chemistry, despite consensus that microwaving food does not adversely affect nutrient content compared to conventionally prepared food.
- Opposition to homogenization, claiming that homogenized milk has little nutritional value and contributes to a variety of negative health effects, although scientists consider such a belief "tenuous and implausible", stating "Experimental evidence has failed to substantiate, and in many cases has refuted, the xanthine oxidase/plasmalogen depletion hypothesis."
- Mercola.com has featured positive presentations of the claims of AIDS denialists, a fringe group which denies the role of HIV in causing AIDS. The scientific community considers the evidence that HIV causes AIDS conclusive.
- Claiming cancer risks arise from mobile phone radiation, which is pseudoscientific.
- Claims that many commercial brands of sunscreen increase, rather than decrease, the likelihood of contracting skin cancer with high UV exposure, and instead advocating the use of natural sunscreens, some of which he markets on his website. This view is not held by mainstream medical science; in 2011, the National Toxicology Program stated that "Protection against photodamage by use of broad-spectrum sunscreens is well-documented as an effective means of reducing total lifetime UV dose and, thereby, preventing or ameliorating the effects of UV radiation on both the appearance and biomechanical properties of the skin."
- Climate disinformation. Mercola suggested the 2023 Hawaii wildfires could have been deliberately set "to facilitate a land grab".
- Rectally administered carbon dioxide creates a protective force preventing illness.
- Mercola wants to "destroy the veterinary industry" in order to "protect our pets from the damage that’s been inflicted upon by this industry."

== FDA warnings ==
For his many dietary supplement and device products over some 16 years during the 21st century, Mercola was warned by the US Food and Drug Administration (FDA) for falsely advertising products approved to "mitigate, prevent, treat, diagnose, or cure" various diseases, including as examples: 1) in 2005, Living Fuel RX(TM) and Coconut Oil Products, in 2006, Optimal Wellness Center chlorella and coconut oil, and in 2011, Meditherm Med2000 Infrared camera, which had no approved evidence for use as a diagnostic or therapeutic device.

During the COVID-19 pandemic, Mercola, his company, and social media site were warned again by the FDA in 2020–2021 for falsely advertising the efficacy of high doses of vitamin C, vitamin D3, quercetin, and pterostilbene products to "mitigate, prevent, treat, diagnose, or cure" COVID-19 disease.

== FTC action ==
In 2016, after marketing and selling tanning beds with the claims that they reduced cancer (backed by discredited studies), the Federal Trade Commission filed a false advertising complaint against Mercola and his companies that resulted in Mercola paying $2.6 million in refunds to customers who had bought their tanning beds, and agreed to a ban preventing them from ever again selling tanning beds.
