= Dan Wilson (biologist) =

American biologist and science communicator

Daniel M. Wilson
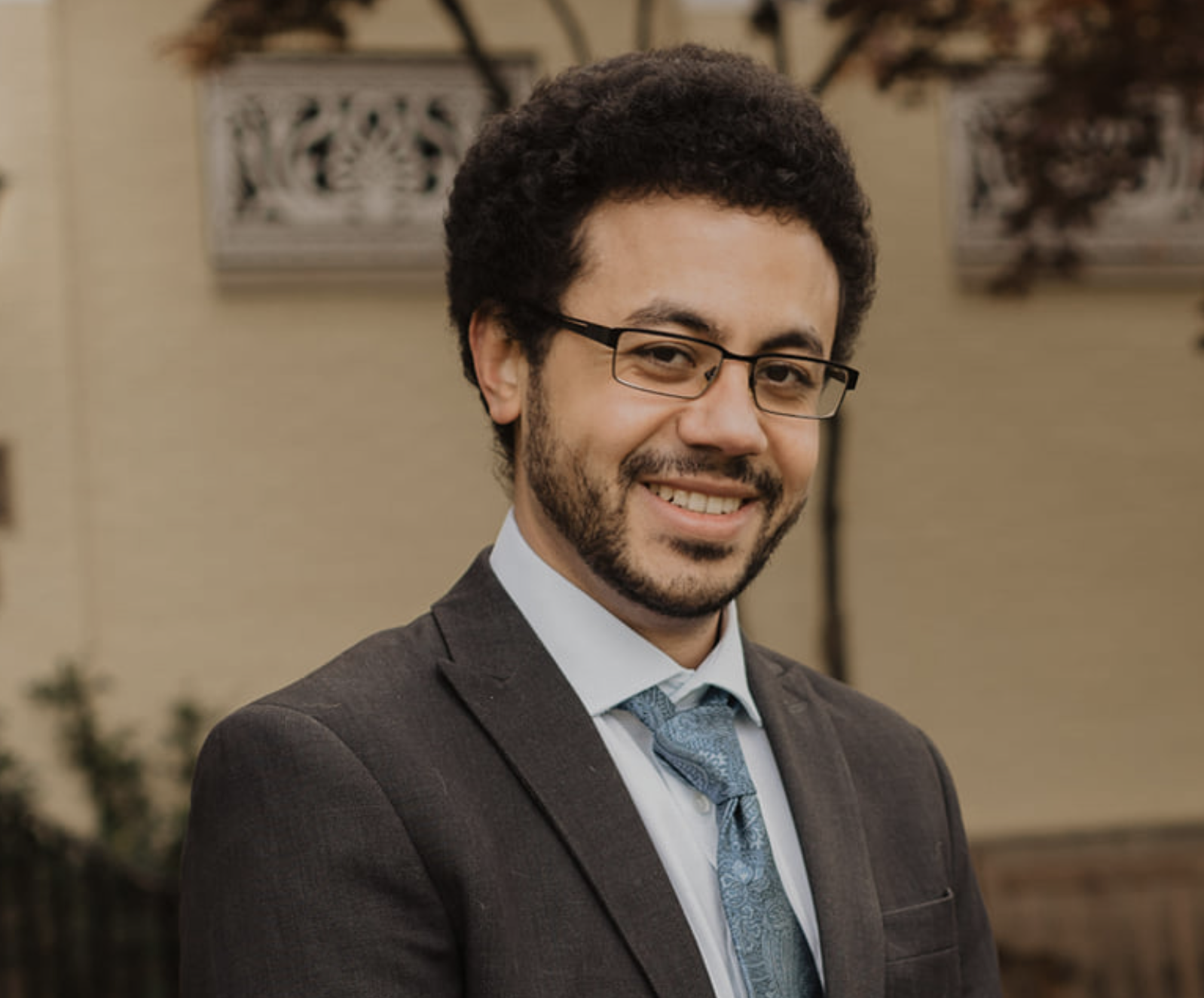
- Wilson in 2020
- Born: Harrisburg, Pennsylvania
- Education: Clarion University (B.S.), Carnegie Mellon University (Ph.D.)
- Scientific career
- Fields: Molecular biology
- Thesis: Assembly of Functional Centers in the Ribosomal 60S Subunit (2021)
- Doctoral advisor: John L. Woolford, Jr.
- Website: Debunk the Funk

Dan Wilson is an American molecular biologist and science communicator. He is best known as a host and creator of the podcast Debunk The Funk, which focuses on pseudoscience surrounding the anti-vaccine movement and COVID-19 misinformation.

== Early life and education ==
Wilson was born in Harrisburg and lived in Pennsylvania nearly his whole life. His parents both had graduate degrees: his father in Education and his mother in environmental biology. He attended a high school in Harrisburg where his father was dean, developing an interest for science but also for conspiracy theories, including cryptids, 9/11 conspiracy theories (through the film Loose Change) and ancient aliens. He credits a good high school biology teacher for giving him the tools to challenge his own conspiracy beliefs and get interested in science communication.

Wilson did his undergraduate studies at Clarion University (B.S. in Biotechnology and Molecular Biology), and a Ph.D. in Molecular Biology at Carnegie Mellon University, studying and working in the laboratory headed by John Woolford. He gradually abandoned his beliefs in conspiracy in his undergraduate years.

His Ph.D. work, he concentrated on studying ribosome biogenesis (how ribosomes get made and made correctly).

== Career and science communication ==
In January 2020, as he was completing his Ph.D., Wilson created a YouTube channel as a hobby, intending to debunk anti-vaccination conspiracists he was familiar with, such as Del Bigtree. With the beginning of the COVID-19 pandemic, he got interested in the new influencers peddling COVID misinformation. Debunk the Funk rapidly gained in popularity in March 2020, as both the pandemic and the influencers profiting from it took off. Wilson did not expect the amplitude of disinformation in the current pandemic. However, he's encouraged by the vaccine numbers, pointing out it took far longer for the polio vaccine to be accepted.

As of February 2023, Debunk the Funk had more than 34,000 subscribers and its videos had been viewed more than 1.3 million times.

Author Matthew Remski describes Wilson's approach as "clear, respectful, meticulous with evidence and clearly devoted to the common good." Inspired by Timothy Caulfield's science communication work, he presents data in a compassionate way to engage with his audience. To produce the videos, Wilson reads the relevant scientific literature and seeks out the scientists currently publishing on the topic to ensure the information he communicates is current.

His distinctive afro developed when he spent the first months of the pandemic avoiding the hair salon. Wilson decided to integrate it to his science communication style: "My dad when he was younger had a pretty big afro growing up in the seventies (...) I kind of like that I get to be that image of him now, I hope he's proud of that."

He frequently appears on podcasts dealing with misinformation such as Conspirituality and Decoding the Gurus, as well as the medical podcasts This Week in Virology and Dr. Drew's.

As of 2023, Wilson was working at Eurofins Scientific.

Pediatric immunologist, Paul Offit praised Wilson's response to Robert F. Kennedy Jr.'s "dangerous misleading information" on the Joe Rogan Experience podcast, calling it "a takedown."

== Publications ==
- Biedka, Stephanie; Micic, Jelena; Wilson, Daniel; Brown, Hailey; Diorio-Toth, Luke; Woolford Jr., John L. (24 April 2018). "Hierarchical recruitment of ribosomal proteins and assembly factors remodels nucleolar pre-60S ribosomes". Journal of Cell Biology. 217 (7): 2503–2518. doi:10.1083/jcb.201711037. PMC 6028539. PMID 29691304. S2CID 21383382.
- Micic, Jelena; Wu, Shan; Wu, Shan; Wilson, Daniel; Tutuncuoglu, Beril; Gao, Ning; JohnL., Woolford Jr. (27 July 2020). "Coupling of 5S RNP rotation with maturation of functional centers during large ribosomal subunit assembly". Nature Communications. 11 (1): 3751. Bibcode:2020NatCo..11.3751M. doi:10.1038/s41467-020-17534-5. PMC 7385084. PMID 32719344.
- Wilson, Daniel M.; Li, Yu; LaPeruta, Amber; Gamalinda, Michael; Gao, Nign; Woolford Jr., John L. (9 October 2020). "Structural insights into assembly of the ribosomal nascent polypeptide exit tunnel". Nature Communications. 11 (5111): 5111. Bibcode:2020NatCo..11.5111W. doi:10.1038/s41467-020-18878-8. PMC 7547690. PMID 33037216.

== See also ==
- COVID-19 misinformation by the United States
- ScienceUpFirst — a Canadian science communication campaign focusing on the pandemic
- Vaccine Confidence Project
