= David Harpp =

American chemist and academic (1937–2026)

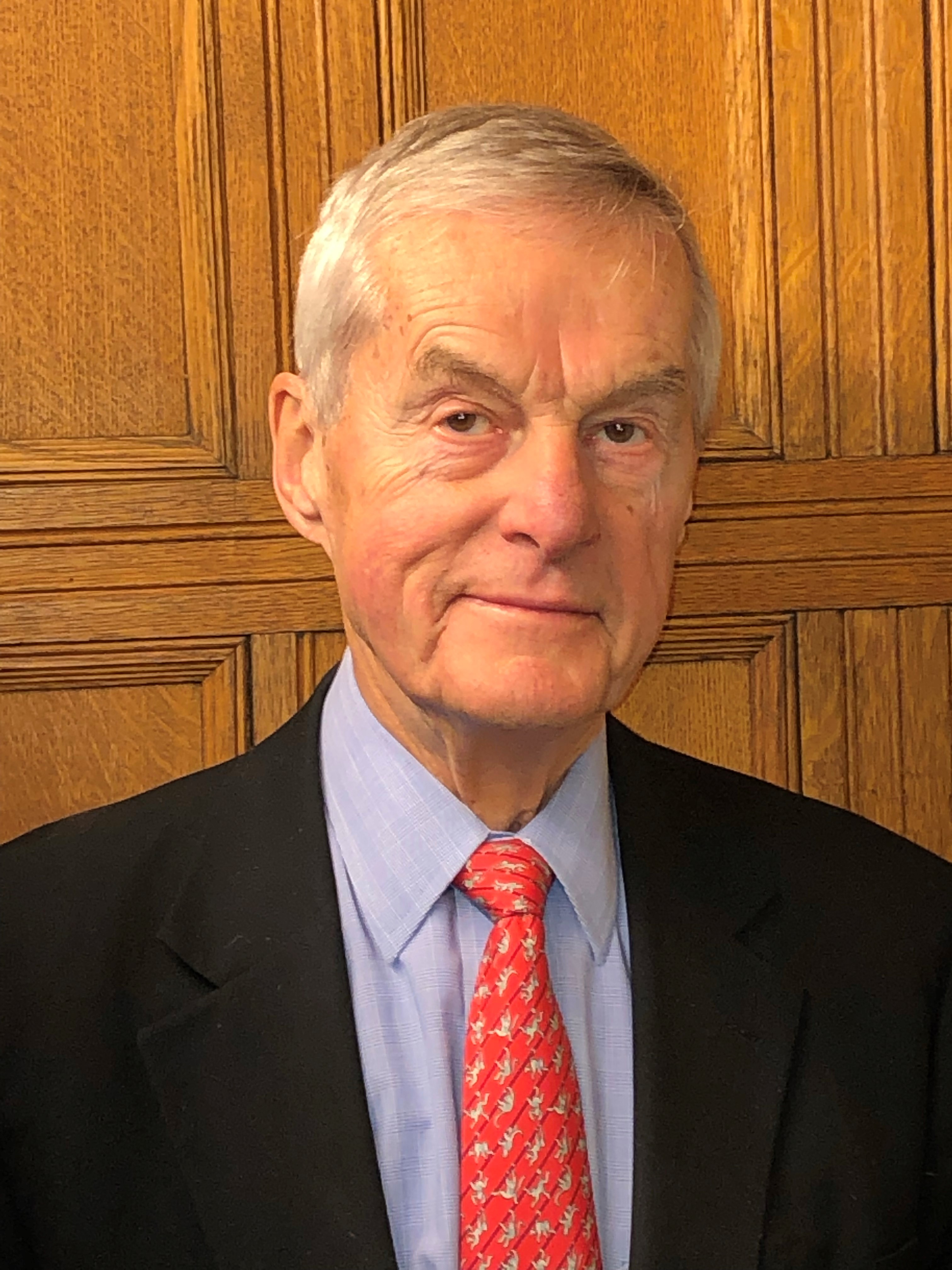
- Harpp in 2019
- Born: David Noble Harpp; January 20, 1937; Albany, New York, U.S.
- Died: February 14, 2026 (aged 89)
- Occupations: Chemist; academic
- Known for: Science communication
- Title: Tomlinson Chair in Science Education at McGill University
- Board member of: Editorial Board, Journal of Sulfur Chemistry; Board of Governors, McGill University
- Awards: Union Carbide Award for Chemical Education; National Catalyst Award; McNeil Medal; Edward Leete Award; Michael Smith Award for the promotion of science

Academic background
- Education: PhD, Organic chemistry
- Alma mater: University of North Carolina

Academic work
- Discipline: Organic chemistry
- Sub-discipline: Organosulfur; selenium
- Institutions: McGill University

David Noble Harpp (January 20, 1937 – February 14, 2026) was an American chemist, science communicator and award-winning university professor. He held the Tomlinson Chair in Science Education at McGill University.

== Life and career ==
Harpp was born in Albany, New York, on January 20, 1937, and did his bachelor of arts at Middlebury College (1959), his master's degree at Wesleyan University (1962) and his PhD at the University of North Carolina (1965).

He published more than 230 chemistry articles in peer-reviewed publications, his main research interest being organosulfur and selenium molecules. In addition, 20 of his articles on teaching innovation were published. He was appointed Tomlinson Chair in Science Education in 2013, with the mandate to "advance the understanding and practice of science education".

With Joseph Schwarcz and Ariel Fenster, Harpp was a founding member of the Office for Science and Society.

Harpp experimented throughout his teaching career with various visual media, from photographic slides to 8mm movies. With his colleagues at the Office for Science and Society, he pioneered the McGill COurses ONline initiative. A proponent of massive open online courses, Harpp thought students can benefit from having access these academic opportunities: "What if the best organic chemistry course, anywhere, was put on by somebody from, say, the University of Illinois, why shouldn't we [assign it at our university]?"

He was also interested in academic integrity. He followed up on his research on the prevalence of cheating by university students by inventing (with others) a computer program that spots cheating in multiple-answer exams. Use of the software, with the introduction of multiple versions of each exam, is credited to practically eliminating this type of cheating at McGill's: "I think 90 per cent of the students who tend to cheat will [look at all the obstacles] and say, 'Nah.'"

Harpp died on February 14, 2026, at the age of 89.

== Selected awards ==
Year	Award
1982	Union Carbide Award for Chemical Education, Chemical Institute of Canada.
1982	Leo Yaffe Award for Excellence in Teaching (Inaugural Award), McGill University Faculty of Science.
1988	National Catalyst Award, Chemical Manufacturer's Association.
1992	McNeil Medal for the Public Awareness of Science, Royal Society of Canada (with A. Fenster and J. Schwarcz).
1993	Le Prix Beppo science education award, "Les Petits Débrouillards" (with A. Fenster and J. Schwarcz).
1995	Edward Leete Award, Organic Division, American Chemical Society.
1996	David Thomson Award for Excellence in Graduate Supervision and Teaching, McGill University Graduate Faculty.
1996	John A. Timm Award for Furtherance of the Study of Chemistry, New England Association of Chemistry Teachers.
1996	Michael Smith Award for the promotion of science, Government of Canada.
1998	3M Teaching Fellow, Society for Teaching and Learning in Higher Education.
2000	Doctor of Science (honoris causa), Acadia University.
2001	Principal's Prize for Excellence in Teaching (Inaugural Award), Full Professor Category, McGill University.
2003	James Flack Norris Award for Outstanding Achievement in the Teaching of Chemistry, Northeast Section of the American Chemical Society.
2012	Doctor of Laws (honoris causa), University of Guelph.
2015	Science Promotion Prize, Canadian Council of Biology Chairs.
