= Jonathan Jarry =

Canadian scientist

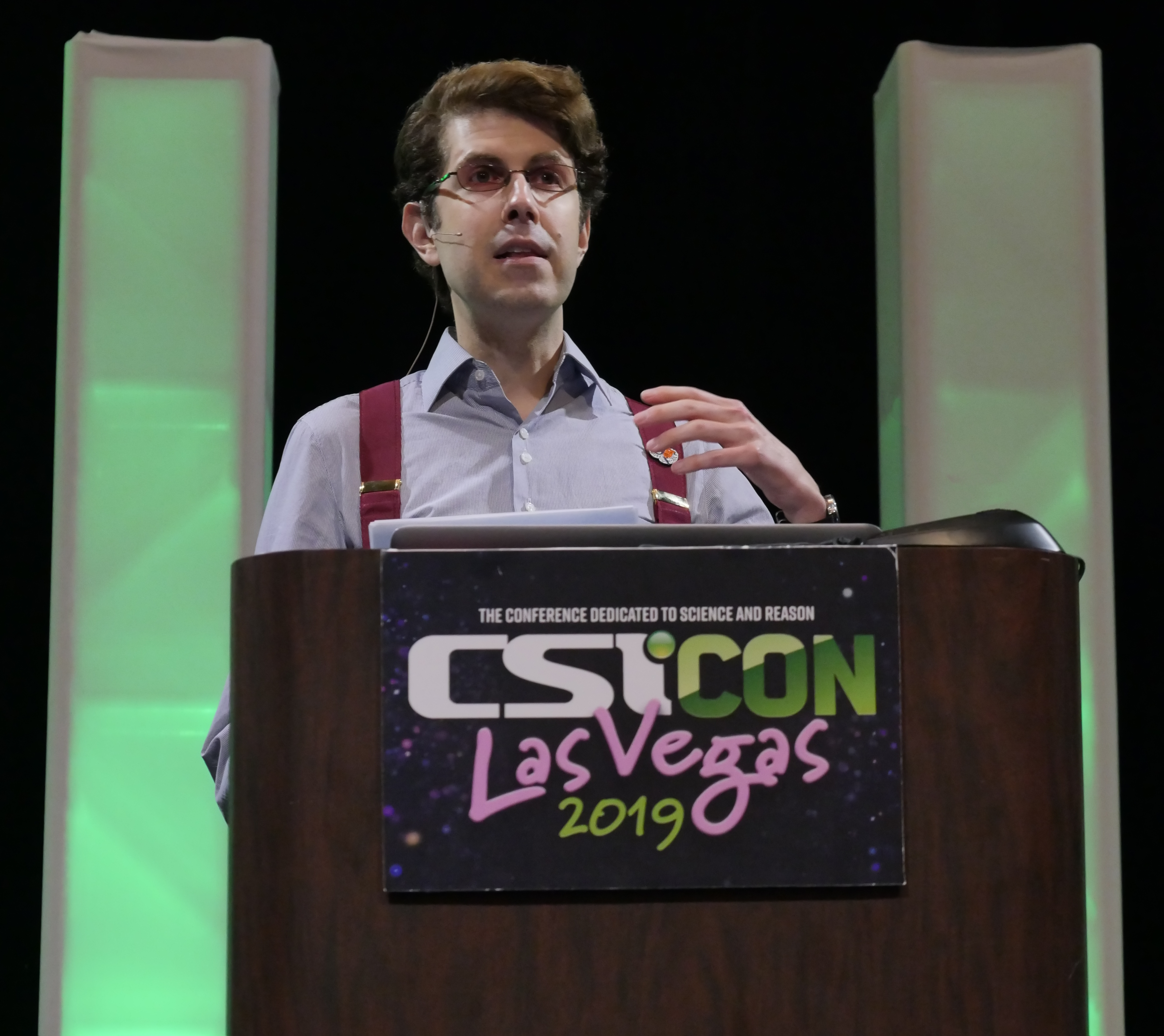
- Jarry at CSICon, 2019
- Born: Canada
- Education: McGill University (BSc); Université de Montréal (MSc)
- Website: Official website

Jonathan Jarry is a Canadian scientist and science communicator working in Montreal, at McGill University's Office for Science and Society (OSS). He is frequently quoted by news media on topics such as misinformation.

== Education and scientific career ==
Jarry developed an early interest in several paranormal topics such as ghosts and vampires as well as cryptozoology, but progressively abandoned those beliefs while studying biochemistry in university.

Jarry earned a B.Sc. in Biochemistry from McGill University in 2003 and an M.Sc. in Molecular Biology from the Université de Montréal in 2005, followed by three years of a PhD program.

His work as a health researcher included muscular dystrophy research, low-vision rehabilitation and molecular diagnostic testing. His interest for forensic biology led him to work for a time at identifying the remains of American soldiers through mitochondrial DNA.

== Science communication ==
Jarry joined McGill University's Office for Science and Society in 2017, where he is Science Communicator as of 2023. Since 2021, the Canadian news magazine L'actualité publishes some of his texts written for OSS. He makes a regular appearance on the noon program of the CTV Television Network's Montreal affiliate.

Jarry has been frequently cited as an expert on misinformation by major media outlets, including the New York Times, Time Magazine, the Washington Post and the Financial Times. He contributes to the ScienceUpFirst education initiative as an expert resource.

From 2015 to December 2024, Jarry has been co-hosting the Body of Evidence podcast with cardiologist Christopher Labos, examining various health claims (such as vitamins curing cancer) through scientific lens. The podcast, which uses humour to present discussions on medical issues between Jarry and Labos (and sometimes guests), won the Canada’s Favourite Blog for 2017 award from Science Borealis. He also hosted the podcast Within Reason from 2013 to 2015. On similar topics, Jarry previously wrote the Cracked Science blog for its two-year run.

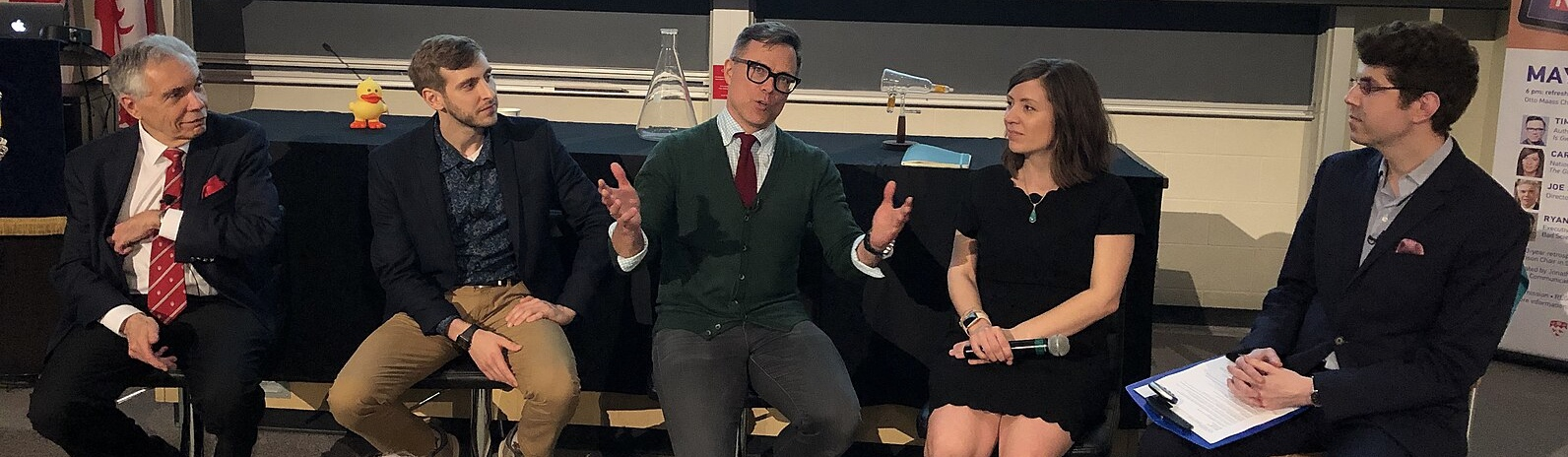
Jarry (right) with Joe Schwarcz, Ryan Armstrong, Timothy Caulfield and Carly Weeks at a 2019 event of the OSS.

Jarry's science education work was prominently featured by numerous media outlets in North America and Europe in July 2018, when a video he produced for the Office of Science and Society went viral, reaching 10 million views and was shared 130,000 times in two weeks. The 2-minute video titled "This NATURAL TRICK can CURE YOUR CANCER" adopted the tone and visual appearance of those promoting fake cures commonly seen on the Internet, claiming one Johan R. Tarjany (an anagram of Jarry's name) discovered a moss derivative that cures cancer, before revealing the information as false and inviting the watcher to think critically about health information. The video gained widespread attention and news coverage when relayed by people with a large online presence such as David Gorski, Susan Gerbic, Kavin Senapathy and comedian Scott Rogowsky.
