= Joseph A. Schwarcz =

Author, sessional instructor (born 1947)

Joseph A. Schwarcz C.M.
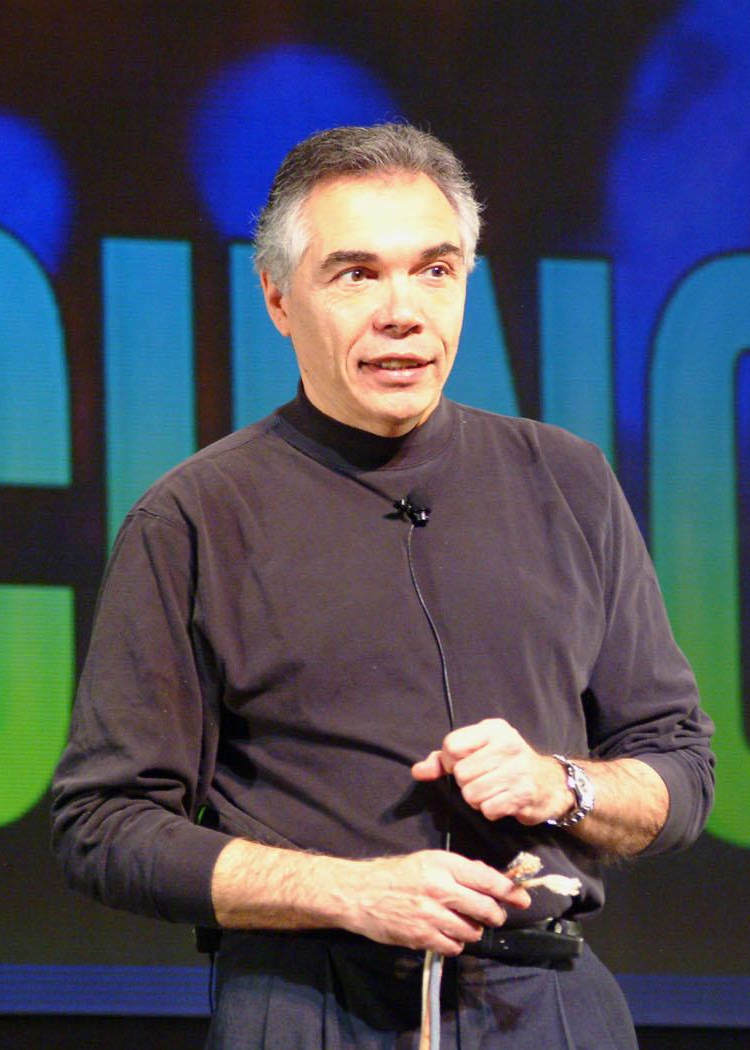
- Dr. Joe giving a presentation for the Trafalgar School for Girls
- Born: August 20, 1947 (age 79); Sopron, Hungary
- Education: McGill University (BSc, PhD)
- Occupations: Author; sessional instructor
- Title: Member of the Order of Canada
- Spouse(s): Alice (deceased, 2016)
- Joe Schwarcz's voice recorded October 2017 at CSICon

Joseph A. Schwarcz CM (born 1947) is an author and a sessional instructor at McGill University. He is the director of McGill's Office for Science and Society.

== Early life ==
Schwarcz is an only child, born in Sopron, Hungary, to Jewish parents. During the Hungarian uprising in 1956, when he was age nine, the family escaped over the border to Austria and migrated to Canada and settled in Montreal, Quebec. Schwarcz attended Logan school on Darlington and went on to study chemistry at McGill University in Montreal, for which he received a BSc (1969) and PhD (1973).

Schwarcz became interested in magic and chemistry at the age of nine, when he saw a magician perform a rope trick at a school friend's birthday party. "Instead of using the usual magic words like Abracadabra, he said that he was going to sprinkle a 'Magic Chemical' on the ropes." Schwarcz was so intrigued that he went to the library and looked up chemistry; he has had a keen interest in both since that day.

== Biography ==
Schwarcz started teaching at Dawson College before moving to Vanier College. He served as chair of the Department of Chemistry at both colleges. He returned to McGill University in 1980 where he currently teaches in courses in the Department of Chemistry and Faculty of Medicine with an emphasis on alternative medicine.

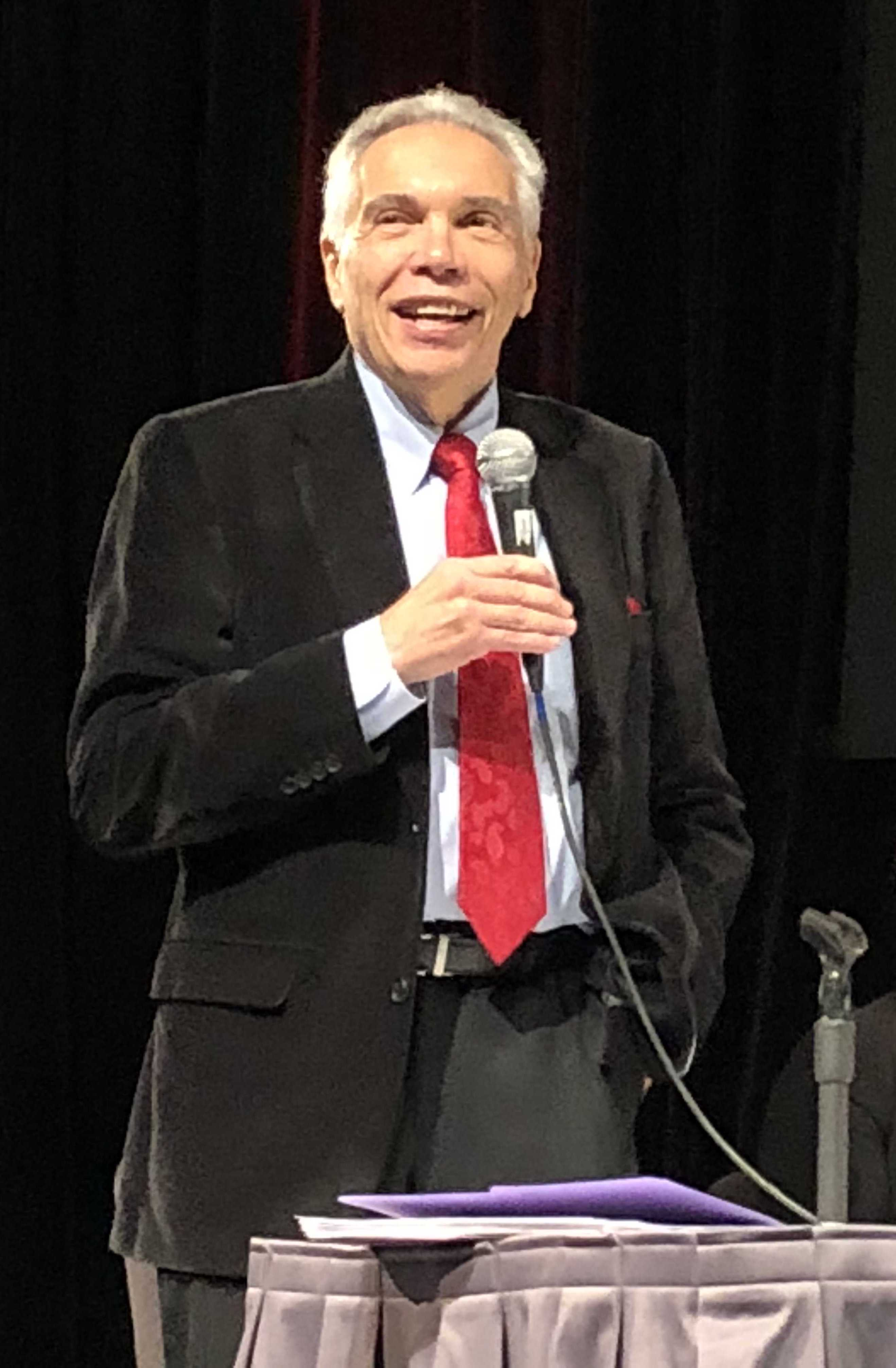
At the 2018 Trottier Public Science Symposium

In 1999, Schwarcz became the founding director of the McGill University Office for Science and Society (OSS) with Ariel Fenster and David N. Harpp. According to their website, the OSS "...is a unique venture dedicated to the promotion of critical thinking and the presentation of scientific information to the public, educators and students in an accurate and responsible fashion." As director, he challenges health fads and the celebrities who promote them. He has also used his knowledge of illusion magic to show how seemingly supernatural feats can be done by ordinary means.

As a university student, Schwarcz found chemistry to be a dry subject, so he established a series of courses designed to bring chemistry to the general student, and later to the public through a series of lectures. The lectures include magic and spontaneity to keep the audience interested.

"A good lecturer is also an actor. A lecture should seem spontaneous, even if it's been given many times before... You capture the audience's attention. Then, without their realizing it, you pump a little scientific information into their brains. Before they know it, they've learned something."

In 2010, 2012, and 2016–2017, Schwarcz was nominated by McGill University as one of the USA Science and Engineering Festival's Nifty Fifty Speakers.

Schwarcz began his media career in 1980 after meeting Montreal Gazette reporter Ted Blackman at the Man and His World exhibition when he was demonstrating how to make polyurethane from two liquids. Blackman reported on the demonstration and made a significant error. Schwarcz wrote to the Gazette, pointing out the error, and Blackman printed a retraction. Radio station CJAD picked up the story and called Schwarcz to talk about it on air. The following week, another scientific issue arose and he was called on again; this led to regular collaborations and to his own weekly radio show (The Dr. Joe Show), which also ran on Toronto's CFRB for about two years.

Schwarcz has appeared hundreds of times on Canadian television and radio, including his single-season show about common foods called Science to Go on the Canadian Discovery Channel. He writes a weekly column for the Montreal Gazette called The Right Chemistry and a monthly column in the Canadian Chemical News.

He is one of the spokespersons for ScienceUpFirst, a science communication initiative aiming at reducing the impact of COVID-19 misinformation online.

In 1999 Schwarcz was awarded the Grady-Stack Award for Interpreting Chemistry for the Public. At the time, he was the first non-American to win the award. He was the joint winner of the 2014 Center for Skeptical Inquiry Robert P Balles Prize for skeptical thinking for his book Is This a Fact?

Schwarcz has honorary doctorates from Athabasca University (2002), Cape Breton University (2011), and Simon Fraser University (2019).

== Personal life ==
Schwarcz and his wife Alice married in 1973. They had three children together. Alice died in March 2016.

== Awards ==
- Royal Society of Canada, the McNeil Medal for outstanding ability to promote and communicate science to students and to the public within Canada. (shared with David Harpp & Ariel Fenster) (1992)
- American Chemical Society, James T. Grady-James H. Stack Award for Interpreting Chemistry (1999)
- Honorary Doctorate of Science, Athabasca University (2002)
- Royal Canadian Institute, Sandford Fleming Medal (2005)
- Society of Chemical Industry, Purvis Memorial Award (2010)
- Chemical Institute of Canada, Montreal Medal (2010)
- In 2014 the Committee for Skeptical Inquiry (CSICOP) presented Schwarcz the Robert B. Balles Prize in Critical Thinking for Is That a Fact? which "unflinchingly takes on all manner of popular misinformation."
- Outstanding Achievement Award, Principal’s Prizes for Engagement Through Media, McGill University (2018)
- In 2024 Schwarcz was appointed as a Member of the Order of Canada

== Selected bibliography ==
- Schwarcz, Joe (2022). Quack Quack: The Threat of Pseudoscience. ECW Press. ISBN 978-1770416581.
- Schwarcz, Joe (2021). Science Goes Viral: Captivating Accounts of Science in Everyday Life. ECW Press. ISBN 978-1770416505.
- Schwarcz, Joe (2019). A Grain of Salt: The Science and Pseudoscience Of What We Eat. ECW Press. ISBN 9781770414754.
- Schwarcz, Joe (2018). A Feast of Science: Intriguing Morsels from the Science of Everyday Life. ECW Press. ISBN 978-1-77041-192-0.
- Schwarcz, Joe (2015). Monkeys, Myths, and Molecules Separating Fact from Fiction, and the Science of Everyday Life. ECW Press. ISBN 978-1-77041-191-3.
- Schwarcz, Joe (2014). Is That a Fact?: Frauds, Quacks, and the Real Science of Everyday Life. ECW Press. ISBN 978-1-770-41190-6.
- Schwarcz, Joe (2011). Dr. Joe's Health Lab: 164 Amazing Insights into the Science of Medicine, Nutrition and Well-being. Doubleday Canada. ISBN 978-0-385-67156-9.
- Schwarcz, Joe (2022). Dr. Joe's Brain Sparks: 179 Inspiring and Enlightening Inquiries into the Science of Everyday Life. Anchor Canada. ISBN 978-0385669320.
- Schwarcz, Joe (2009). Dr. Joe's Science, Sense and Nonsense: 61 Nourishing, Healthy, Bunk-free Commentaries on the Chemistry That Affects Us All. Doubleday Canada. ISBN 978-0385666046.
- Schwarcz, Joe (2008). Brain Fuel: 199 Mind-Expanding Inquiries into the Science of Everyday Life. Anchor Canada. ISBN 978-0385666039.
- Schwarcz, Joe (2008). An Apple A Day: The Myths, Misconceptions and Truths About the Foods We Eat. Harper Collins. ISBN 978-0-002007-64-1.
- Schwarcz, Joe (2005). Let Them Eat Flax: 70 All-New Commentaries on the Science of Everyday Food & Life. ECW Press. ISBN 978-1550226980.
- Schwarcz, Joe (2003). Dr. Joe and What You Didn't Know: 177 Fascinating Questions about the Chemistry of Everyday Life. ECW Press. ISBN 978-1550225778.
- Schwarcz, Joe (2002). The Fly in the Ointment: 70 Fascinating Commentaries on the Science of Everyday Life. ECW Press. ISBN 978-1550225204.
- Schwarcz, Joe (2001). The Genie in the Bottle: 68 All New Commentaries on the Fascinating Chemistry of Everyday Life. ECW Press. ISBN 9781550224429.
- Schwarcz, Joe (2001). Radar, Hula Hoops, and Playful Pigs: 67 Digestible Commentaries on the Fascinating Chemistry of Everyday Life. Holt Paperbacks. ISBN 9780805074079.
