= 19 to Zero =

Canadian communications initiative

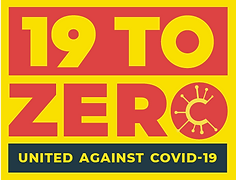
- Formation: August 2020; 6 years ago
- Founder: Jia Hu, Theresa Tang
- Headquarters: Calgary, Alberta
- Chair: Jia Hu
- Chair: Theresa Tang
- Website: https://www.19tozero.ca/

19 to Zero is a Canadian not-for-profit behavioural sciences initiative based in Calgary, Alberta. Hosted at the University of Calgary, the public–private partnership is made up of around 500 members including public health specialists, academics, behavioural psychologists, marketers and multimedia creators. Its purpose is to increase confidence in vaccines for COVID-19 and other diseases by tackling vaccine hesitancy. The group publishes materials on its website and through partner organizations, including videos, billboards, presentations, brochures and in-person events.

== History ==
=== Founding ===
19 to Zero was launched in August 2020 at the University of Calgary in order to influence the behaviour of the public surrounding public health measures and COVID-19 vaccines. The group's primary goal is to increase vaccine uptake in order to meet immunization targets, working to coordinate messaging among health care workers across Canada.

19 to Zero and the University of Toronto conducted a survey in the fall of 2020 to gauge routine vaccination rates following the declaration of the COVID-19 pandemic.

In September 2020, Alberta Innovates announced a $392,080 grant to fund 19 to Zero with a project titled "Changing COVID-19 Behaviors through a data-driven targeted marketing campaign."

19 to Zero collaborated in the development of the University of Calgary School of Public Policy's Vaccine Hesitancy Guide, and participated in the Faster Together program to "promote Covid-19 vaccine acceptance."

=== Community activation ===
On March 12, 2021, 19 to Zero hosted a webinar on vaccine hesitancy and COVID-19 conspiracy theories led by members of the Ontario COVID-19 Science Advisory Table, Queen's University, University of Waterloo and Alberta Children's Hospital. A fundraiser led by the University of Calgary raised $86,825 towards supporting 19 to Zero's efforts against COVID-19 misinformation, falling short of its $100,000 goal. Beginning in April 2021, the Calgary chapter of the World Economic Forum's Global Shapers Community initiative supported 19 to Zero by hosting town hall sessions on COVID-19 vaccines.

Some of 19 to Zero's community engagement activities included handing out postcards with QR codes linking to available vaccination appointments.

In August 2021, Shoppers Drug Mart announced it was providing funding to 19 to Zero in order to increase delivery of COVID-19 vaccines to target hesitant populations. 19 to Zero also partnered with Suncor Energy, who contributed $150,000 to coordinate a local vaccination campaign. In October 2021, the group launched a new behaviour change campaign called "It's Never Too Late" following an "unprecedented surge" of admissions to intensive care units in Alberta. The campaign video was produced with Emergence Creative to increase "stalled" vaccination rates, and was accompanied by billboard advertisements.

Following Health Canada's approval of COVID-19 vaccines for children aged 6 months to 11 years old, 19 to Zero participated in an advertising campaign called "Max the Vax" alongside the Canadian Medical Association, York Region and the Ontario Association of Children's Aid Societies. In 2022, 19 to Zero received a total of $480,000 in grant funding from the Public Health Agency of Canada's Immunization Partnership Fund to enhance the role of schools in promoting vaccine acceptance among students, their families, and teachers.

=== Post-pandemic ===
On September 25, 2024, the Government of Alberta announced a $1.5 new million partnership with 19 to Zero and the Alberta Cancer Foundation to deploy mobile lung cancer screening units to remote Alberta communities.

== Funding ==
As a not-for-profit organization, 19 to Zero's activities are funded by government grants, corporate sponsorship and in-kind donations. Financial supporters include Alberta Children's Hospital, Alberta Health Services, Alberta Innovates, AstraZeneca, BD, Canadian Institutes of Health Research, City University of New York, GlaxoSmithKline, Heart and Stroke Foundation of Canada, Hill+Knowlton Strategies, Kantar Group, Merck, Moderna, Novavax, Pfizer, Public Health Agency of Canada, Sanofi, Shaw, McMaster University, Ontario College of Pharmacists, University of Calgary, University of Toronto, Western Economic Diversification and Women's College Hospital.

=== Federal project grants ===
Period	Funded Project Title	Description	Target Audience	Funding Amount
2020–2023	Reinventing the Critical Role of Schools in Building Vaccine Confidence across Canada	This project will strengthen the relationship between public health and the education sector by enhancing capacity within networks that support students, assessing community needs, and contributing to optimum student health.	Students, their families, and teachers	$480,000
2023–2024	Building Vaccine Confidence Amongst Newcomers in Canada: Educating Parents on School-Based Vaccination Programs	The project will partner with newcomer-serving organizations to educate families on the critical role that school-based programs play in keeping children current with their vaccinations. This involves tailoring pre-existing educational resources as well as developing new resources that specifically meet the needs of newcomers. These resources will be available in multiple languages and easily accessible through pre-existing information pathways within the school and health systems.	Newcomer parents and their children (under 18) in Alberta	$200,000

== Organization ==
=== Leadership ===
19 to Zero was co-founded by Jia Hu and Theresa Tang. Jia Hu was a Medical Officer of Health with Alberta Health Services. Hu is the medical director in the Canadian division of Cleveland Clinic, having previously worked at McKinsey & Company consulting in the healthcare and pharmaceutical sectors. He sits on the board of directors for Partners In Health Canada, and has worked during the COVID-19 pandemic to ramp up testing, risk communications and contact tracing. He also developed a contact tracing app funded by Alberta Innovates, and published research on behaviour change strategies towards increasing uptake of COVID-19 vaccines among children and other target populations.

=== Partners ===
19 to Zero is partnered with government, academic and corporate organizations. The group leads the Canadian arm of the "COVID-19 New Vaccine Information, Communication, and Engagement" (CONVINCE) Initiative, a global collaboration between the CUNY Graduate School of Public Health and Health Policy, the London School of Hygiene and Tropical Medicine's Vaccine Confidence Project, and Wilton Park, an executive agency of the Foreign, Commonwealth and Development Office in the United Kingdom. 19 to Zero is a participating member of the Faster, Together vaccine promotion initiative.

19 to Zero partnered with IV.AI to analyze online social media conversations in order to generate models to combat misinformation and collect information about vaccine hesitancy narratives. The organization also provided support for the first mobile vaccination clinic in Alberta led by Alberta Health and the Business Council of Alberta. The Alberta Federation of Regulated Health Professionals lists 19 to Zero as one of its COVID-19 resource providers. Additional partners include:

- Alberta Blue Cross
- Alberta Innovates
- Alberta Medical Association
- Angus Reid Institute
- Black Physicians' Association of Ontario
- Calgary Public Library
- Canadian Cancer Society
- Canadian Muslim COVID-19 Task Force
- Cleveland Clinic
- Dartmouth College
- Hill+Knowlton Strategies
- Kantar
- Kids Help Phone
- Latin-American Covid Task Force
- Massachusetts Institute of Technology
- McCann
- McMaster University
- Mount Sinai Health System
- National Collaborating Centre for Determinants of Health
- Neighbourhood Pharmacy Association of Canada
- New York Academy of Sciences
- Ontario College of Pharmacists
- Partners In Health Canada
- South Asian Covid Task Force
- Toronto Public Health
- Toronto Transit Commission
- University of Alberta
- University of British Columbia
- University of Calgary
- University of Manitoba
- University of Toronto Department of Family and Community Medicine
- Vaccine Confidence Project
- WestJet
- Women's College Hospital
