= Bad Science Watch =

Canadian consumer protection non-profit

- Legal status: Non-profit corporation
- Purpose: Analyze dubious scientific claims, promote objective critical thinking, advocate for the enforcement of consumer protection regulation
- Official language: English
- Chair: Michael Kruse
- Secretary: Jonathan Paynter
- Executive Director: Ryan Armstrong
- Board of directors: Anthony Gavin, Janice Stevenson
- Website: www.badsciencewatch.ca

Bad Science Watch is a Canadian non-profit organization dedicated to improving consumer protection policies and promoting proper scientific inquiry, especially as it relates to health products and services marketed to the public.

Bad Science Watch intervenes both in the media and at the governmental level, advocating for stronger consumer protection against false scientific claims that could have an impact on the health of Canadians. The group's campaigns include raising awareness that homeopathic nos odes are not a proper replacement for vaccines, rules framing the marketing of natural health products and countering anti-wifi activism.

Its advisory council includes scientists such as Paul Offit, each specializing in an area of interest.

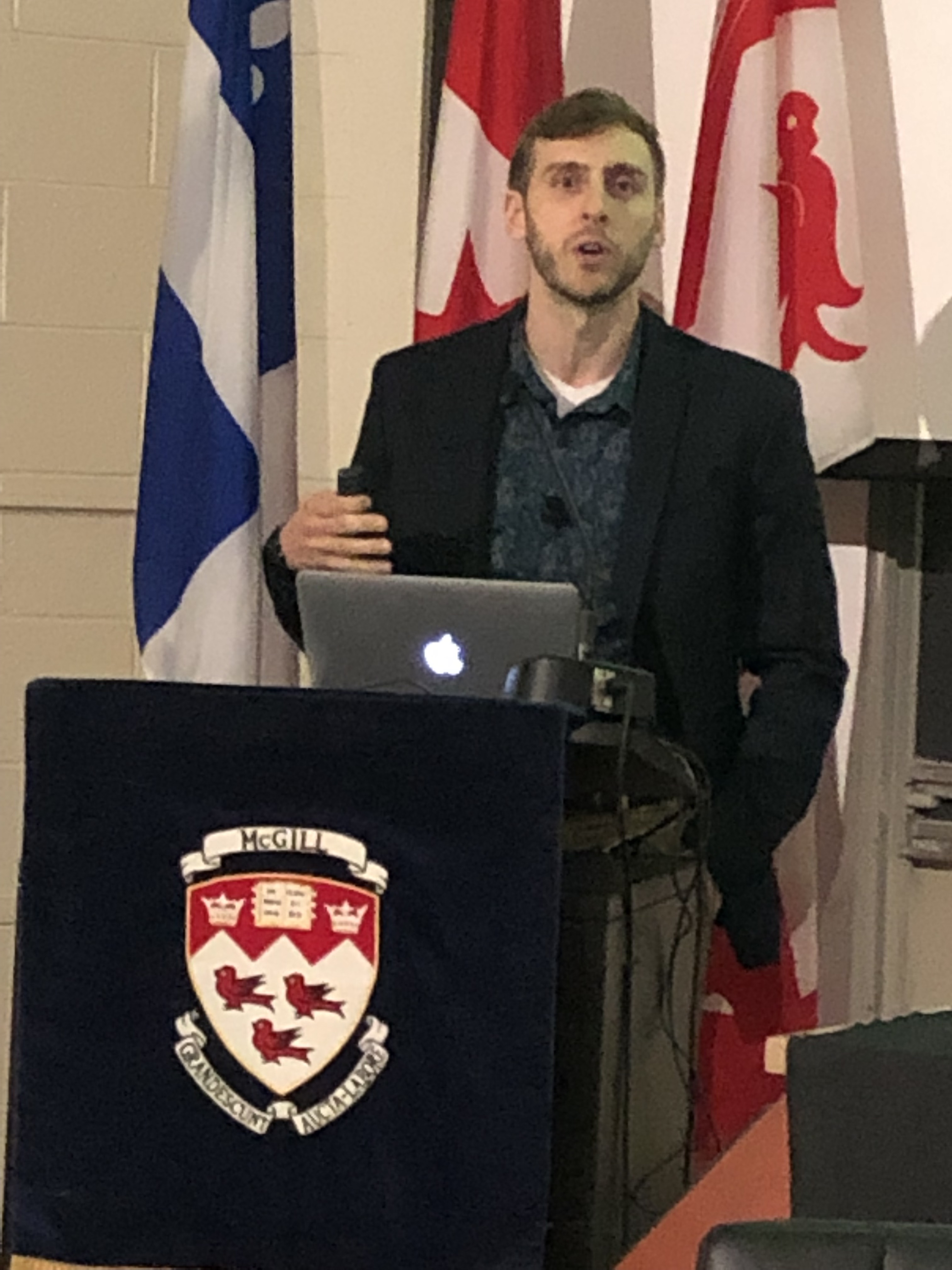
Executive Director Ryan Armstrong speaking at an event hosted by the Office for Science and Society in 2019.
