= Stuck: How Vaccine Rumors Start and Why They Don't Go Away =

Book about vaccination

- Author: Heidi Larson
- Language: English
- Subject: Vaccines
- Publisher: Oxford University Press
- Publication date: 2020
- Publication place: United Kingdom
- Pages: 200
- ISBN: 9780190077242
- OCLC: 1121083645
- Dewey Decimal: 614.4/7
- LC Class: RA638 .L37 2020

Stuck: How Vaccine Rumors Start and Why They Don't Go Away (2020), published by Oxford University Press and written by the director of the London School of Hygiene and Tropical Medicine's Vaccine Confidence Project, Heidi Larson, looks at what influences attitudes to vaccination. It was largely compiled before the COVID-19 pandemic and inspired by her feeling that the dialogue between scientists and the public regarding vaccines was becoming complex on a background of increasing online information.

Using historical examples, from 19th century protests against smallpox vaccination to 21st-century boycotts of polio vaccination programmes, to show how rumours about vaccinations spread, the book looks chiefly at high-income countries and examines the factors that form opinions about vaccination.

== Publication ==
Stuck: How Vaccine Rumors Start and Why They Don't Go Away was published by Oxford University Press in 2020, and written by the director of the London School of Hygiene and Tropical Medicine's Vaccine Confidence Project, Heidi Larson. It was largely compiled before the COVID-19 pandemic. It has 200 pages, of which 127 pages cover eight chapters, which are preceded by acknowledgements, prologue and an introduction, and are followed by notes and an index.

== Synopsis ==
The book addresses misinformation related to vaccination, and asks how vaccine rumors start and why they do not go away. Looking chiefly at high-income countries, the book examines social, political, psychological and cultural factors that make up the various mind-sets to vaccination. Larson also uses historical examples, from 19th century protests against smallpox vaccination to 21st-century boycotts of polio vaccination programmes, to show how rumours about vaccinations spread. She writes: "Digital media has certainly contributed to the social amplification of risk, but there is no single culprit in this wave of dissent."

Larson was inspired by her feeling that the dialogue between scientists and the public, regarding vaccines, was becoming complex, against a background of a proliferation of online information. However, there is "opportunity for change", if vaccine experts can engage using social media.

The book concludes with a call to social media companies to take responsibility for the part their technology plays in disseminating information pertaining to vaccines, because "for vaccine uptake to increase, the public must be inspired to protect one another".

== Reception ==
Released during the COVID-19 pandemic, The Lancet stated that "at a time of increasing global uncertainty, Larson's values of respecting other people's views and engaging with them will be crucial". With the challenges of misinformation surrounding COVID-19 vaccines, Joan Donovan, writing in Nature, agreed with Larson's findings. The book was also reviewed in the New Scientist.
