= Correactology =

Pseudoscientific treatment

Alternative medicine
- Claims: Regulation of the density of cells, eight segments of cells in the human body.
- Related fields: Alternative medicine
- Year proposed: 2002
- Original proponents: Allan and Michael Lapointe

Correactology is a system of alternative medicine based on the unsubstantiated claim that "regulating the density of cells" in the body improves a wide range of ailments. An offshoot of chiropractics, the treatment was developed in Sudbury (Ontario) in 2002 by brothers Michael and Allan Lapointe. It has been branded a pseudoscience by critics and the sole training program in the subject has been taken to court by former students.

During correactology treatments, the practitioners hold their hands over patients, snap their fingers, and apply a light touch to the person's skin. Allan Lapointe claims they are first looking for "areas of resistance in the eight segments of cells, indicating areas of pathological or anatomical dysfunction." The practitioner then allegedly uses his hands to change the behaviour of proteins present in human cells, to improve wellness and reduce pain: "We cause a cascading effect to change the behaviour of the proteins. When the proteins change, our behaviour changes because, of course, proteins control all."

Medical professionals have been questioning the practice as it becomes more widespread. The deputy editor of the Canadian Medical Association Journal Matthew Stanbrook denounced the claims made by the practitioners: "That is pseudo-science that uses a scientific word that doesn't mean what density means. That makes absolutely no sense, to talk about the density of cells not being optimal. It makes even less sense to put forward the idea that through the manipulation involving touching, one could set the density of cells to an optimum level." McGill University's Office for Science and Society also identifies correactology as a pseudoscience.

While they have no formal medical training, the Lapointes say they are working on research showing their techniques are more effective than placebos.

Practitioners are present in a dozen clinics throughout Ontario, as well as one in Gatineau (Quebec). Correactology is a trademarked term by a corporation owned by the Lapointe brothers and run by their parents. The Ontario College of Chiropractors and the Ontario College of Physicians do not recognize the treatment. The Quebec College of Physicians is investigating the techniques and claims related to correactology.

== Collège Boréal programme and court case ==
In 2016, the Collège Boréal signed a four-year agreement by which Sudbury's Correactology Health Care Center would offer a training programme for the college's students, for $50,000 per student. Boréal cancelled the agreement after two years, as three former students took the correactology center to court on charges of false statements, conspiracy, impediment to trade, and breach of contract.

The court proceedings showed that the students had to commit to giving 30 percent of their future earnings to the correactology center. The court rebuffed an attempt to dismiss the case by invoking the confidentiality clause of the training contract in July 2018. The court proceedings continue.
