= Anjali Khandwalla =

Gujarati short story writer and vocalist (1940–2019)

Anjali Khandwalla (1940 ― 11 April 2019) was a Gujarati short story writer and vocalist.

She was a lecturer at the Vanier College, Montreal, Canada from 1970 to 1975. She moved to Ahmedabad in 1975 and settled there.

== Works ==
She had written teen story collection Leelo Chhokro. Ankhni Imarato (1988) is her short story collection which has fifteen stories. These stories draw attention to the formation of situations and their descriptions and expressions. Her other short story collection Ghughat Ke Pat Khol was well appreciated. It includes a story "Chandlano Vyap" (The All-pervasive Bindi) and Shaktipat which are female-centred stories.

Her third short story collection Areesama Yatra was published posthumously in 2019.

== See also ==
- List of Gujarati-language writers
