= Vanier College =

Public college in Montreal, Quebec

- Collège Vanier (French)
- Motto: Fiat Voluntas Dei
- Type: College
- Established: 1970
- Affiliations: CICan, CCAA, QSSF
- Provost: Sandrina Joseph
- Director General: Benoit Morin
- Students: 9200
- Undergraduates: pre-university students; technical
- Location: Saint-Laurent, Quebec; H4L 3X9; 45°30′54″N 73°40′32″W
- Campus: Urban
- Sports team: Cheetahs
- Colours: Red and Gold
- Mascot: Cheetah
- Website: www.vaniercollege.qc.ca
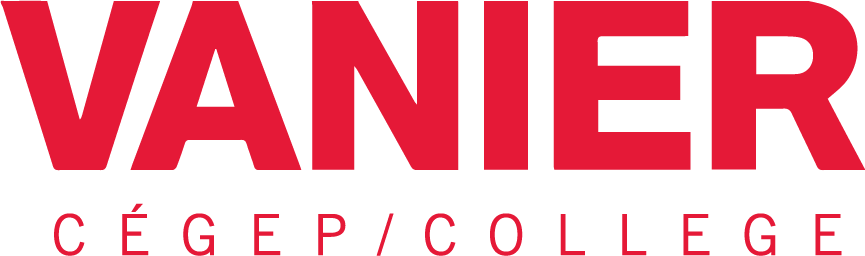

Vanier College (French: Collège Vanier) is an English-language public college located in the Saint-Laurent borough of Montreal, Quebec, Canada. It was founded in 1970 as the second English-language public college of Quebec's public college system, after Dawson College. Vanier is located just north of CEGEP Saint-Laurent, a French-language public college. Today, the student population numbers over 6,700 full-time Diploma students with an additional 2,000 students attending through the Continuing Education Department (credit and non-credit courses and programs). Vanier College is one of 48 public Cegeps in the province.

== Programs ==
Vanier College has over 25 programs of study in both two-year pre-university and three-year technical fields. With a student population averaging eight thousand, Vanier College is the second-largest English-language college in Québec. The college offers two types of programs: a full-time pre-university program and technical career programs leading to a Diploma of College Studies (DCS). The pre-university programs, which take two years to complete, cover subject matter that roughly corresponds to the additional year of high school given elsewhere in Canada in preparation for a chosen field in university.

== Partnerships ==
The College of General and Professional Education is affiliated with the Association of Canadian Community Colleges (ACCC) and Canadian Colleges Athletic Association (CCAA).

== Athletics ==
The college participates as the Vanier Cheetahs in the Canadian Colleges Athletic Association and the Quebec Student Sport Federation, and is known for its men's and women's basketball, football (soccer) and rugby union teams, men's Canadian football teams, and women's flag football teams.

== History ==
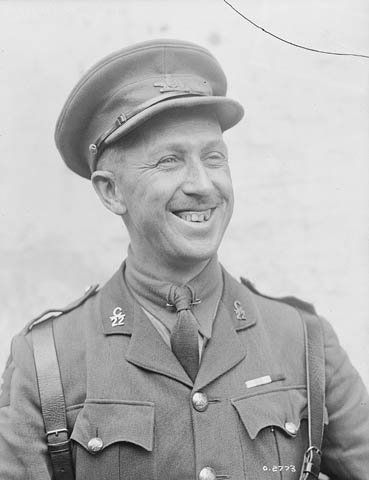
Georges Vanier

Vanier College was named in honour of Georges Vanier, Canada's second native-born Governor General.

=== Before Vanier (1817–1970) ===
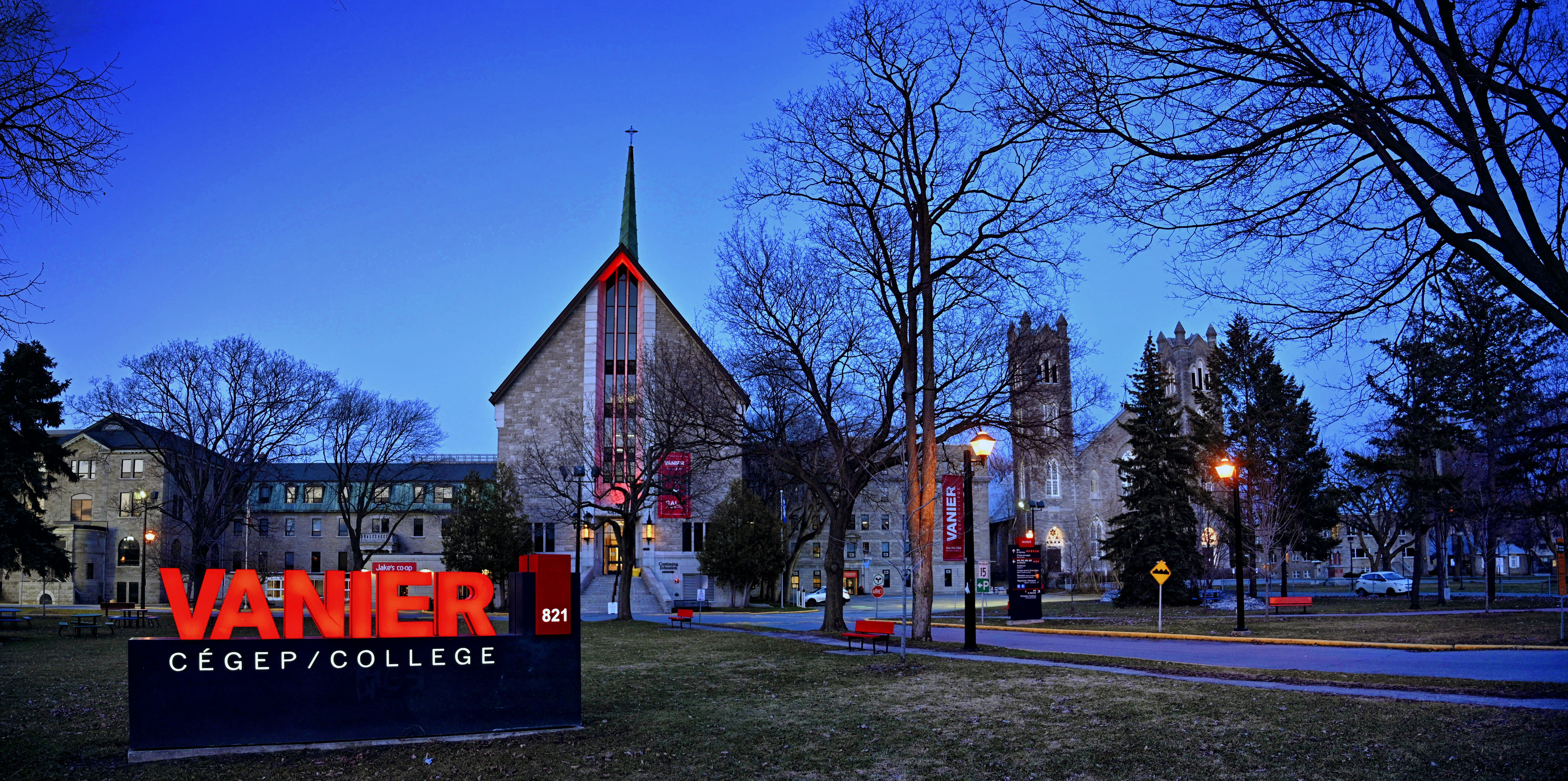
Vanier as seen from Sainte-Croix boulevard

Vanier College today consists of 10 different buildings on a single campus. Each of its buildings was built at a different point in the college's history, and is identified by a letter of the alphabet.

The land that the campus is located on today was first used for the Village de Saint-Laurent chapel, opened in 1817. Thirty years later, a convent, known as the Couvent Notre-Dame-des-Anges, was built nearby by the Sisters of Holy Cross (fr: Sœurs de Sainte-Croix). The original Convent building was later expanded into the building known as the "C building" today.

In 1897, the sisters opened the first college on the campus land, on the location of today's "E building". That building was expanded in 1848 and 1857 to become today's "E building". In 1873, a chapel was built that connected the convent and college buildings. That chapel was a forerunner of today's "F building". The "B building" was a further expansion of the convent built on the north side of the "C building" in 1904. It was unclear exactly when the "D building" was built, but it appears to have been at around this same time. The "D building" connected to the rear (east side) of the original "F building" chapel.

Originally, both the "D" and "E" buildings had elaborate balconies on every floor, which were removed in the 1970s. This is why several windows on both buildings today are taller than the rest of the windows in the building - these windows were doors to the balconies in the original building design.

In 1911, the original Village de Saint-Laurent chapel was demolished, to be replaced by a new school for young girls, Académie Saint-Alfred. The cupola at the top of the new building was designed to reflect a similar cupola on the original chapel building. This new building eventually became Vanier's "H building".

In 1933, the Sisters opened the yet another college, Collège Basile-Moreau, within the existing convent buildings. This soon required further expansions to the campus. In the 1940s, the "A building" was built at the north end of the "B building".

In the 1950s, the original "F building" chapel was demolished and replaced with the building that stands as the "F building" today. In 1967, several institutions were merged and became public ones, when the Quebec system of CEGEPs was created.

=== Since becoming Vanier (1970–present) ===
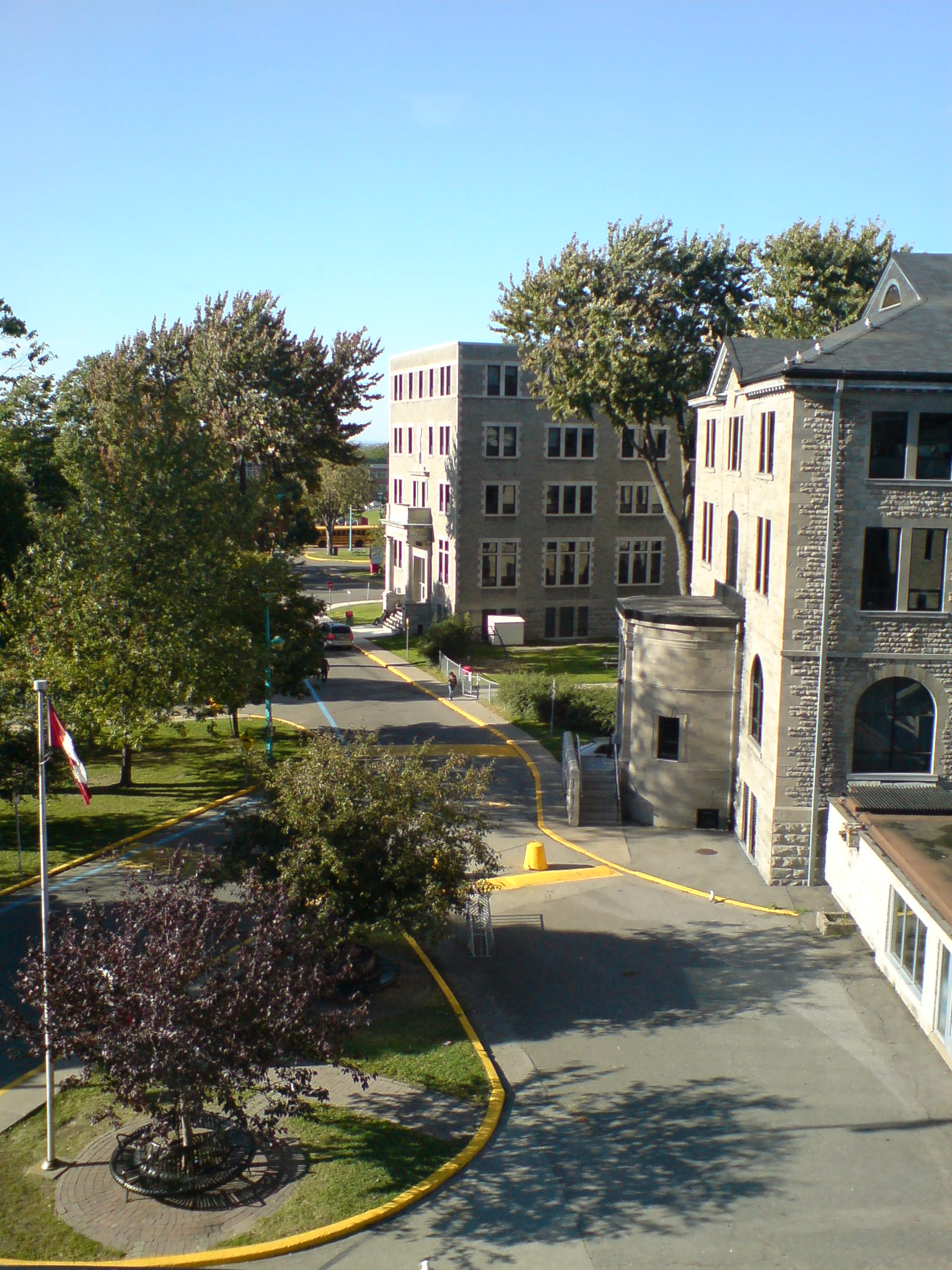
A view of the campus

In 1970, the Quebec government purchased the entire property and it was re-opened as Vanier College, Quebec's second English language public college (after Dawson College that had opened the year previous). Enrollment in its first year was approximately 1,400 students.

== Notable alumni ==
- Robert Aaron, jazz musician
- Jabari Arthur, wide receiver for the CFL
- Tim Biakabutuka, former NFL player
- Randy Chevrier, former CFL and NFL player
- Russell Copeman, politician
- David De La Peralle, former CFL offensive lineman
- Farell Duclair, Canadian football player
- Otis Grant, one-time boxing world champion
- Kamala Harris, 49th Vice President of the United States
- Yolande James, first black woman elected to the provincial legislature
- Patrick Kabongo, offensive lineman for the CFL Edmonton Eskimos
- Emilie Kahn, musician also known as Emilie & Ogden
- Elias Koteas, actor
- Paul Lambert, CFL player for Hamilton Tiger-Cats and Montreal Alouettes
- Alison Levine, boccia player
- Robert Libman, politician
- John Moore, radio and television broadcaster who currently works on CFRB
- Thomas Mulcair, Leader of the Official Opposition in Canada, leader of the NDP, a lawyer, university professor, and politician
- Andy Nulman, co-founder of "Just for Laughs" comedy festival
- Karine Sergerie, Olympic silver medalist
- Mutsumi Takahashi, full-time co-anchor for CFCF News
- Frédérique Vézina, opera singer
- Andrew Walker, actor
- Patrick Watson, indie rock musician
- Steven Woloshen, pioneer of hand-made experimental films
- Steve Zatylny, Canadian football player
- Mitch Garber, business executive, philanthropist
- David Zilberman, teacher, coach, wrestling champion
- Mitch Joel, journalist, publicist
- Herbie Kuhn, public address announcer (Toronto Raptors)
- Mark Cohen, eye surgeon, founder of Lasik MD
- Juliette Powell, Miss Canada titleholder in 1989, television host, producer, author
- Ralph Gilles, automobile designer and executive
- Danny Desriveaux, former CFL player
- Alan DeSousa, politician
- Karim Mane, NBA Player
- Abraham Toro, MLB player
- Aiemann Zahabi, UFC fighter
- Tomas Jack-Kurdyla, Canadian football player

== Notable staff ==
- Denis Sampson, Irish writer and literary critic
- Errol Sitahal, writer, director, filmmaker and actor, taught at Vanier College in the 1970s
- Dr. Joe, Joe Schwarcz, science popularizer, former chemistry teacher
- Ariel Fenster, science popularizer, former chemistry teacher
- Gordon Edwards, mathematics, President and Co-Founder of the Canadian Coalition for Nuclear Responsibility
- Martine Dugrenier, former world champion in women's wrestling
- Anjali Khandwala, Gujarati writer, taught at Vanier College in 1970s

== See also ==
- List of colleges in Quebec
- Higher education in Quebec

Other English-language Colleges:

- Champlain
- Dawson College
- Heritage College
- John Abbott College
- Marianopolis College
