= Herbie Kuhn =

Canadian sports announcer

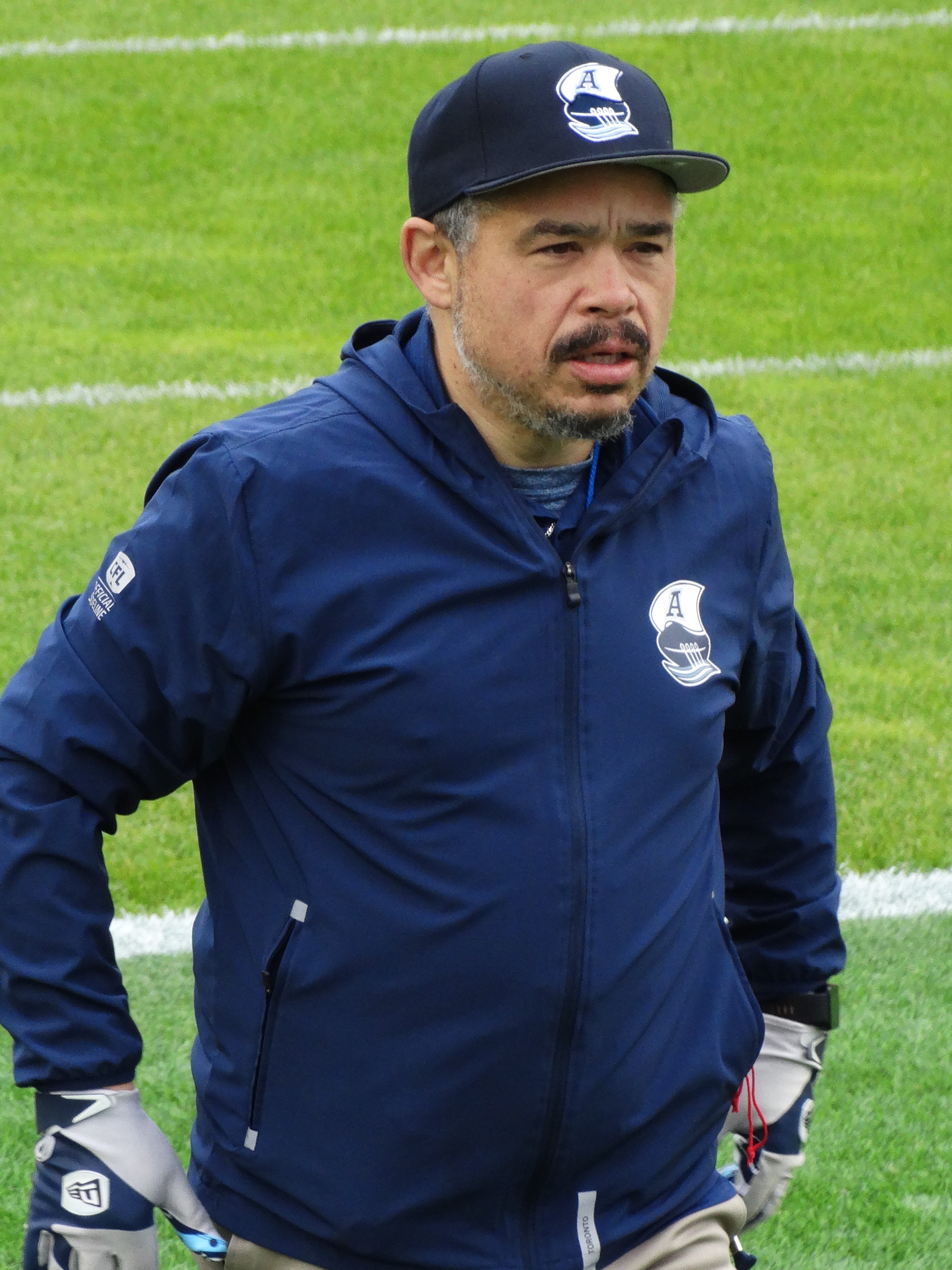
- Kuhn with the Argonauts in 2022
- Born: January 1969 (age 57); Toronto, Ontario
- Occupations: Public address announcer Chaplain
- Employer(s): Toronto Raptors; Toronto Argonauts

Herbie Kuhn (born January 1969 in Toronto, Ontario) is a Canadian public address announcer for the Toronto Raptors of the National Basketball Association.

== Early life ==
Kuhn was born in Toronto, Ontario and graduated from Vanier College where he received his Diplome d'Etudes Collegiale, Languages & Literature in 1994. While attending Vanier college, he served as the public address announcer for the football and basketball teams. He was later hired as the announcer for the 1994 FIBA World Championship basketball tournament in Toronto and in Hamilton.

== Professional sports announcing ==
Kuhn has served as the arena voice of the Toronto Raptors of the National Basketball Association since the team's inception in 1995. He rarely misses a home game; however, in November 2006, he and his wife adopted a child from Africa named Enhle, and, as a result, missed seven Raptors games during November and December. He also missed one home game against the Chicago Bulls on November 25, 2007, for unknown reasons.

== Other work ==
Kuhn is a member of the Gideon Bible Society, and is also the team chaplain for the Toronto Argonauts of the Canadian Football League and the Toronto Raptors.

In 2020, he narrated a portion of the 8th Canadian Screen Awards.

Prior to becoming the Raptors Arena announcer, Herbie Kuhn worked at the Nike Outlet store in Toronto as the Manager.
