= Timothy Caulfield =

Canadian law professor (b. 1963)

Timothy Caulfield CM
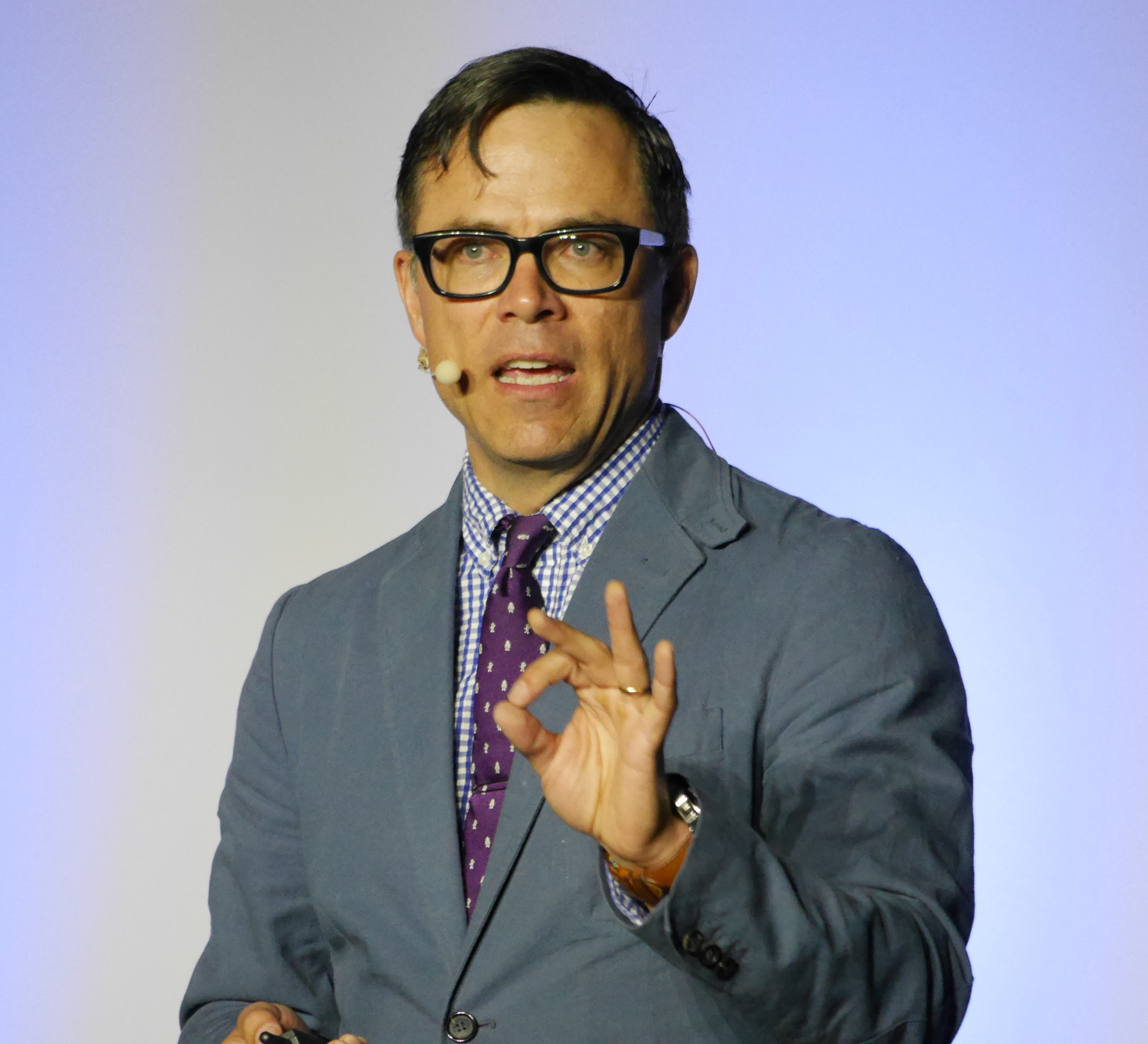
- Caulfield in 2015
- Born: 1963 (age 62–63); Cape Cod, Massachusetts, U.S.
- Education: University of Alberta, Dalhousie University
- Scientific career
- Workplaces: University of Alberta
- Thesis: The Last Straw: The Impact of Cost Containment in Health Care on Medical Malpractice Law (1993)

Timothy Allen Caulfield CM (born 1963) is a Canadian professor of law at the University of Alberta, the research director of its Health Law Institute, and current Canada Research Chair in Health Law and Policy. He specializes in legal, policy and ethical issues in medical research and its commercialization. In addition to professional publications, he is the author of several books aimed at the general reader and host of a television documentary series debunking pseudoscientific myths. He is a fellow of the Committee for Skeptical Inquiry and the Pierre Elliott Trudeau Foundation.

== Early life and education ==
Caulfield went to high school in Edmonton, Alberta. He attended the University of Alberta, earning a B. Sc. in 1987 and a law degree in 1990. He completed a Masters in Law at Dalhousie University in 1993. During this period he also performed in two punk rock and new wave bands, The Citizens and Absolute 9.

== Academic career ==
In 1996, Caulfield became an assistant professor at the University of Alberta. After working several years as an associate professor, he became a full professor in 2004 and is currently teaching biotechnology. In 1993, he became Research Director of the Health Law Institute at the University of Alberta, a position he currently occupies. In 2013, he was named a fellow of the Pierre Elliott Trudeau Foundation. He is a Health Senior Scholar at the Alberta Heritage Foundation for Medical Research and has worked on a variety of advisory committees involved in medical and scientific ethics, including one with the International Society for Stem Cell Research.

Caulfield has published numerous articles in academic journals and popular media on topics related to ethics and the effect of media hype on medical research. He is the editor for the Health Law Journal and Health Law Review. He is a member of the Royal Society of Canada, and the Canadian Academy of Health Sciences. He is a member of the Task Force on Ethics Reform at the Canadian Institutes of Health Research.

Represented by his publisher Penguin Random House, Caulfield works with a speakers bureau called Speakers' Spotlight on a variety of topics including COVID-19, misinformation and anxiety. Some of his recent clients for speaking engagements include the Canadian Health Libraries Association, Canadian Nuclear Association, Canadian Nurses Association, Canadian Society of Hospital Pharmacists, Dietitians of Canada, Hamilton Health Sciences, Own the Podium and the Seven Oaks General Hospital Foundation.

=== COVID-19 ===
Caulfield has referred to the amount of misinformation surrounding the Coronavirus disease 2019 pandemic as an "infodemic". He has received funding from the federal government's Rapid Research Funding Opportunity to investigate how misinformation about COVID-19 spreads and to look for ways to stop it. He noted that this is the first time a global pandemic has spread in the time of social media, which allows for information to be shared quickly and often inaccurately. Some of the supposed cures of COVID-19 that Caulfield has debunked are drinking bleach, drinking silver, snorting cocaine, homeopathy, drinking cow urine, garlic soup and hydroxychloroquine.

On April 8, 2020, Caulfield was appointed to the Royal Society of Canada Task Force to help support Canada's response to and recovery from COVID-19. The task force mandate is to give informed responses to the many challenges that may come to Canada as a result of the virus and will work with academies from around the world to identify societal challenges.

Caulfield is a spokesperson for ScienceUpFirst, a science communication initiative aiming at reducing the impact of COVID misinformation online.

In 2020 Tim Caulfield collaborated with his brother Sean Caulfield, also a University of Alberta professor, to use artistic images to share pro-science information in the context of the COVID-19 pandemic.

=== Health advice by celebrities ===
Caulfield developed an interest in the health advice given by celebrities and the significant impact that it has on public health, especially when it is based on pseudoscience. He uses social media platforms, interviews, his books and his television series to counter some health claims made by celebrities such as actress and entrepreneur Gwyneth Paltrow and alternative medicine advocate Deepak Chopra.

His 2015 book Is Gwyneth Paltrow Wrong About Everything? focuses on the negative impact celebrity endorsement have on public health. Caulfield argues that the public should be wary of accepting health advice from entertainers and artists. The book won the 2015 Science in Society General Book Award from the Canadian Science Writer's Association.

=== "Scienceploitation" and stem cell tourism ===
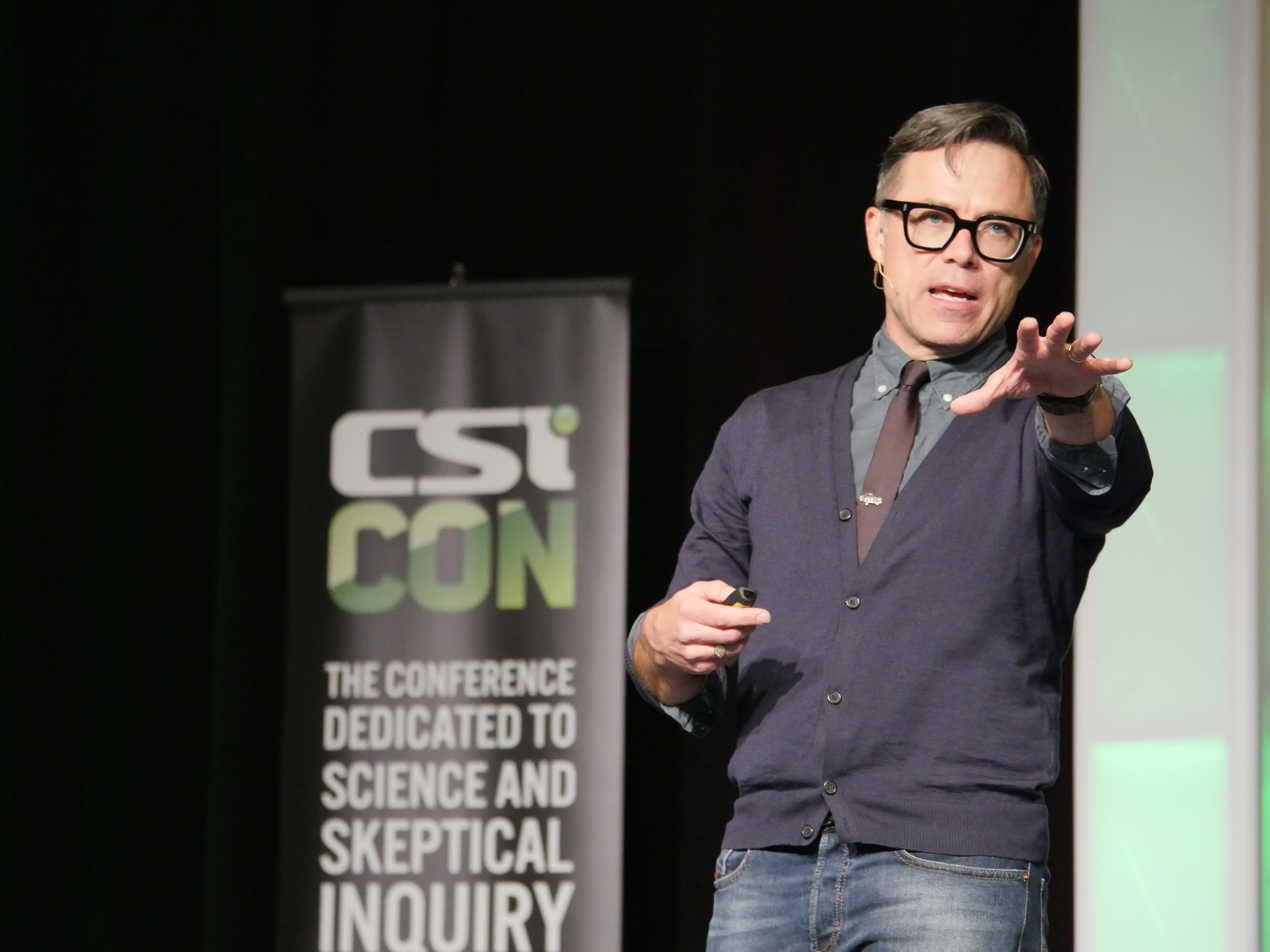
Caulfield speaking about "scienceploitation" at CSICon 2018 in Las Vegas

Caulfield has advocated for medical professionals to not exaggerate potential benefits of new unproven treatments in fields that have only long-term potential. Stem cell treatments in particular is sometimes fraudulently hyped as a very expensive miracle cure for anything from autism, Lou Gehrig’s disease and spinal cord injury, to cerebral palsy, a practice Caulfield calls "scienceploitation".

In addition to plain dishonesty, Caulfield argues that the media looking for human-interest stories often portray unsound treatments as effective and give hope to patients. Researchers face pressure to present their research as being more advanced than it actually is and to respond to commercialization imperatives.

Caulfield points out that these practices have been used all the way back to the discovery of magnetism, and tend to appear whenever new scientific discoveries attract the interest of the public: "Now you see stem cell, genetic, and increasingly, microbiome research being exploited to sell a host of ridiculous products. My favorite example, however, has to be the use of “quantum physics.” Many alternative medicine practitioners seem to think that if they slap the word “quantum” on a product it sounds more science-y and more legitimate."

== Books and collections ==
Caulfield edited several reference works on research ethics. In the last decade, he also wrote books taking aim at pseudoscience.

2012	The Cure for Everything	The science behind sensationalized media reports about the effects of diet and fitness on health.
2015	Is Gwyneth Paltrow Wrong About Everything?	Celebrity endorsement of dubious treatments and their effect on public health.
2017	The Vaccination Picture	Myths propagated against vaccines.
2020	Relax Dammit!: A User's Guide to the Age of Anxiety	How misinformation and science affect daily decisions.
2024	The Certainty Illusion: What You Don't Know and Why It Matters	How various forces contributing to disinformation chaos.

He is also editor or coeditor of the following publications:

- Editor, with Maria Knoppers and T. Douglas Kinsella. Legal Rights and Human Genetic Material (1997).
- Editor, with Bryn Williams-Jones. The Commercialization of Genetic Research: Ethical, Legal, and Policy Issues (1999).
- Editor, with Barbara Von Tigerstrom (2002) || Health Care Reform & the Law in Canada: Meeting the Challenge(2002).
- Editor, with Sean Caulfield|| Imagining science: Art, Science and Social Change (2008).
- Editor, with Nola Ries and Tracey Bailey. Public Health Law and Policy in Canada, 2nd ed. (2008).
- Editor, with Jocelyn Downie and Coleen M. Flood. Canadian Health Law and Policy, 4th ed. (2011).
- Editor, with Sean Caulfield and Curtis Gillespie. Perceptions of Promise: Biotechnology, Society and Art (2011).
- Editor, with Nola Ries and Tracey Bailey. Public Health Law Policy in Canada (2013).

== Television ==
Caulfield is the host and main protagonist of the documentary series, A User's Guide to Cheating Death, presented in 60 countries, including Canadian specialty channel Vision TV. The first six-episode season presents Caulfield subjecting himself to various treatments of doubtful efficacy. The episodes include conversations with people believing the treatments work for them and discussions with panels of experts. The series was renewed for a second season, and became available on Netflix in North America during the Fall of 2018. His show was reviewed by Jonathan Jarry, saying, "Tim Caulfield is an excellent host for a show that shines a disinfecting light on medical pseudoscience. Unlike many skeptics in the public eye, he does not come across as antagonistic or condescending."

Episode	Original airing date
Season 1
"Detox Debunked: The Truth Behind the Phenomenon"	September 18, 2017
"The Fountain of Youth: Science of Cosmetics"	September 25, 2017
"Full Potential: Genetic Testing and the Rise of Personalized Medicine"	October 2, 2017
"Losing It: Extreme Dieting"	October 9, 2017
"Au Natural: Turning Our Back to Modern Medicine"	October 16, 2017
"Scienceploitation"	October 23, 2017
Season 2
"I'll Sleep When I'm Dead"	October 15, 2018
"Vitamins and Supplements"	October 22, 2018
"Sex and Relationships"	October 29, 2018
"Germs"	November 5, 2018
"Body Hacking"	November 12, 2018
"Spiritual Science"	November 19, 2018

In 2024, Caulfield tackled misinformation in the "manosphere" in his documentary "Harder, Better, Faster, Stronger" where he exposed the extremes that some men are going to in order to be seen as masculine.

== Awards ==
- 2007, Fellow, Royal Society of Canada.
- 2010, Till and McCulloch Award, Stem Cell Network.
- 2013, Fellow, Pierre Elliott Trudeau Foundation.
- 2015, Science in Society General Book Award winner, Canadian Science Writers’ Association.
- 2016, Distinguished Academic Award, Confederation of Alberta Faculty Associations.
- 2017, Gold Winnier, Best Blog or Column, Digital Publishing Awards.
- 2020, Sandford Fleming Medal for outstanding communication of science, Royal Canadian Institute for Science.
- 2020, Fellow, Committee For Skeptical Inquiry, Center For Inquiry.
- 2020, Balles Prize for Critical Thinking, Center For Inquiry.
- 2022, Member, Order of Canada.

== Personal life ==
Caulfield enjoys track cycling and running. He is married and has four children.

He suffers from motion sickness, which is one of the reasons he abandoned a fledgling career as a rock musician. He is "a bit of a germophobe. I hate sharing food. I'm not good with handshakes or hugs."
