= Emilie Kahn =

Emilie & Ogden
- Born: Emilie Kahn; Montreal, Quebec
- Genres: Indie pop; Indie folk
- Instruments: Harp; Vocals
- Years active: 2013–present
- Label: Secret City Records

Emilie Kahn is a Canadian musician. Kahn originally released music under the name Emilie & Ogden, but in 2019 began performing under her real name.

== Early life ==
Kahn was born and raised in Montreal, Quebec. She began writing songs on the piano and guitar at age 14. Kahn originally played the flute and enrolled in CÉGEP to study classical music. After seeing a harpist, Sarah Pagé, accompanying the choir she was performing with at Vanier College, she began taking private harp lessons.

== Career ==
Kahn's Lyon & Healy-made lever harp is from the Ogden range, hence the name Emilie & Ogden.

Emilie & Ogden released a mini-album in 2013. In June 2015, Emilie & Ogden was signed to Secret City Records. In July 2015, her stripped-down harp cover of Taylor Swift's "Style" went viral. The video of the cover was re-tweeted by Swift herself and garnered over 300,000 views. Secret City released Emilie & Ogden's debut record, 10,000, later that year.

In 2019, Kahn began releasing music as Emilie Kahn. Explaining the change, she told the Montreal Gazette, "I was kind of tired of being the harp girl." Her first album under the new name was 2019's Outro. Her album Maybe was released on Secret City Records in 2023.

== Discography ==
- 10,000 (2015) (as Emilie & Ogden)
- Outro (2019)
- Maybe (2023)
