= Heidi Larson =

Anthropologist and immunisation expert

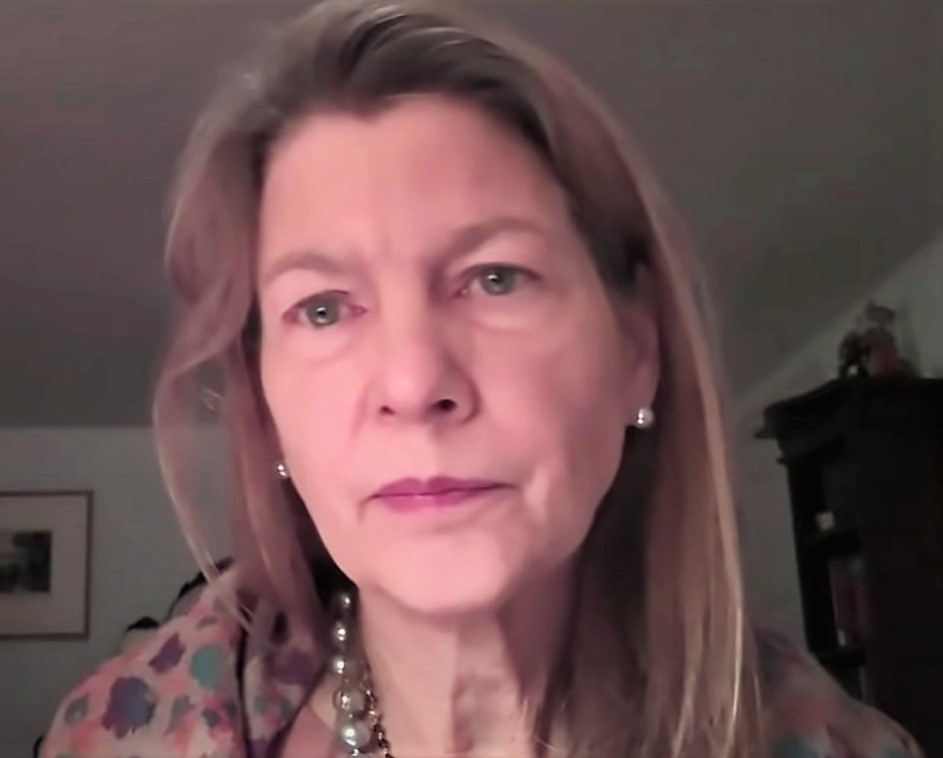
- Larson speaks to the World Economic Forum in 2021
- Citizenship: American
- Education: Harvard University (Visual and Environmental Studies); University of California, Berkeley (PhD Anthropology)
- Spouse: Peter Piot
- Scientific career
- Fields: Anthropology
- Workplaces: London School of Hygiene & Tropical Medicine; Save the Children; UNICEF; World Health Organization; University of Washington
- Website: www.lshtm.ac.uk/aboutus/people/larson.heidi

Heidi J. Larson, Lady Piot is an American anthropologist and the founding director of the Vaccine Confidence Project. Larson headed Global Immunisation Communication at UNICEF and she is the author of Stuck: How Vaccine Rumors Start and Why They Don't Go Away. She was recognized as one of the BBC's 100 women of 2021.

== Education and early career ==
The daughter of a priest and civil rights advocate, Larson grew up in Massachusetts.

Larson worked for Save the Children in the West Bank and in Nepal after college. Working abroad got her interested in anthropology and she eventually graduated from the University of California in that discipline. She earned a Ph.D. in 1990. She worked for several companies in the 1990s, including Apple and Xerox.

== Work in immunisation ==
Larson went back to UNICEF in 2000, working on global communications for several of the agency's vaccination programs. She developed an expertise on working with local health workers to defuse rumors that threatened to derail vaccination initiatives. She founded the Vaccine Confidence Project at the London School of Hygiene & Tropical Medicine, which she still runs as of 2020, in addition to teaching anthropology, Risk and Decision Science.

Since 2015, Larson has been leading a European Union project to support vaccination efforts in Sierra Leone, Rwanda, the Democratic Republic of the Congo and Uganda, identifying and countering rumours that may reduce the effectiveness of the campaign. After working on ebola vaccination, the group is now debunking myths about the flu and COVID-19.

Larson is Director of European Initiatives at the Institute for Health Metrics and Evaluation (IHME) and a Clinical Associate Professor in the Department of Global Health at the University of Washington. Amid the COVID-19 pandemic, she co-chaired (alongside J. Stephen Morrison) the CSIS-LSHTM High-Level Panel on Vaccine Confidence and Misinformation in 2020.

Describing herself as "a patient optimist", Larson understood early that significant efforts had to be made to fight misinformation about vaccines. Former UNICEF Executive Director Carol Bellamy said Larson "wasn't yelling 'The sky is falling', she was yelling, 'The sky could fall if we don't do something'".

In a paper published in February 2021, Larson acknowledged extensive collaboration with, advisory board membership of, and funding from, vaccine manufacturers, especially the pharmaceutical companies GlaxoSmithKline and Merck & Co. Inc. She was recognized as one of the BBC's 100 women of 2021.

== Other activities ==
- Virchow Prize for Global Health, Member of the Council (2022–present)

== Personal life ==
Larson is married to the Belgian virologist Peter Piot.

== Selected publications ==
- Larson, Heidi J. (2020). Stuck: How Vaccine Rumors Start and Why They Don't Go Away. Oxford: Oxford University Press. ISBN 9780190077242.
- de Figueiredo, Alexandre; Simas, Clarissa; Karafillakis, Emilie; Paterson, Pauline; Larson, Heidi (September 10, 2020). "Mapping global trends in vaccine confidence and investigating barriers to vaccine uptake: a large-scale retrospective temporal modelling study". The Lancet. 396 (10255): 898–908. doi:10.1016/S0140-6736(20)31558-0. PMC 7607345. PMID 32919524.
- Larson, Heidi J.; Figueiredo, Alexandre de; Xiahong, Zhao; Schulz, William S.; Verger, Pierre; Johnston, Iain G.; Cook, Alex R.; Jones, Nick S. (October 1, 2016). "The State of Vaccine Confidence 2016: Global Insights Through a 67-Country Survey". eBioMedicine. 12: 295–301. doi:10.1016/j.ebiom.2016.08.042. ISSN 2352-3964. PMC 5078590. PMID 27658738. Archived from the original on June 2, 2019.
