= John L. Woolford Jr. =

American biologist

John L. Woolford Jr. is an American biologist currently at Carnegie Mellon University and an Elected Fellow of the American Association for the Advancement of Science. He was the Head of the Department of Biological Science from 2008 to 2010, and again from 2014 to 2016.

Woolford received his B.A. in Chemistry from Rice University in 1971, and his Ph.D. from Duke University in 1976.
