= ScienceUpFirst =

Canadian science education campaign

ScienceUpFirst is a Canadian initiative launched to counter misinformation online, especially about COVID-19. Launched January 25, 2021, it brings together independent scientists, health care providers and science communicators.

== Goals and history ==
The initiative is the result of conversations between Senator Stan Kutcher and Timothy Caulfield, who were discussing ways to counter misinformation about COVID-19. In April 2021, the Government of Canada announced $2.25 million in funding for two new projects to increase uptake of COVID-19 vaccines, one of which was ScienceUpFirst. The initiative received $2,590,682 in new funding through the Canadian Association of Science Centres from the Public Health Agency of Canada's Immunization Partnership Fund.

The groups aims at disseminating information created by its members or selected from credible sources. Starting in March 2021, it also plans to track misinformation online and post science-based content to oppose it. In addition to recruiting athletes and celebrities, it's building a network of volunteers to increase the distribution of the selected information.

The initiative will be especially active against misinformation about COVID-19 vaccination, which threatens to have an impact on vaccination rates. Caulfield commented that the amount of disinformation circulating in the context of the COVID-19 pandemic is unlike anything experienced in decades. He hopes the campaign can get information to people looking online for reliable information.

The campaign is active on Twitter, Facebook, and Instagram. It tries to apply best practices in fighting misinformation that were identified by various studies on science communication and public opinion.

== Organization ==
ScienceUpFirst is organized around the Canadian Association of Sciences Centres, COVID-19 Resources Canada and the University of Alberta's Health Law Institute. Institutional partners of the initiative include the American Association for the Advancement of Science (AAAS), British Columbia Centre for Disease Control, the Canadian Institutes of Health Research, and the Royal Canadian Institute, along with a variety of community partners including 19 to Zero.
