= Alberta Innovates =

Canadian provincial crown corporation

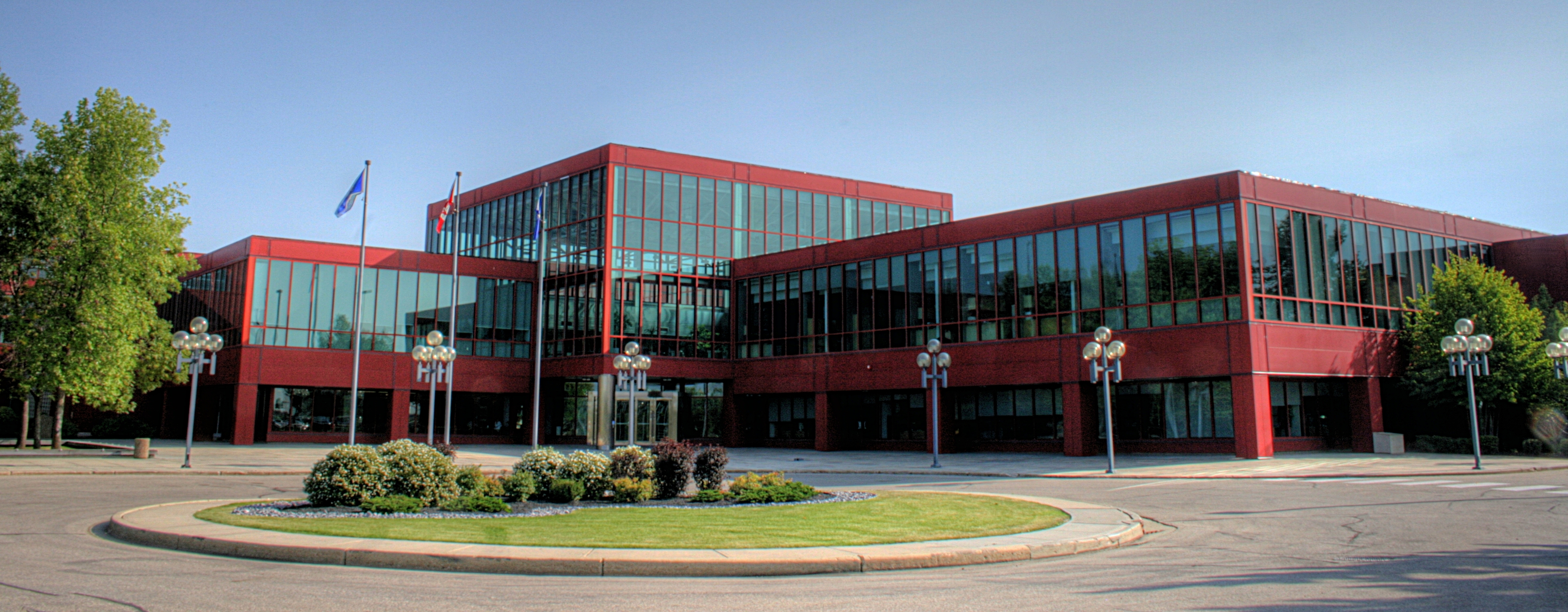
- Headquarters
- Abbreviation: AI
- Formation: 1921 — Original establishment of the Research Council of Alberta (RCA); 2016 — Establishment of the Latest iteration of Alberta Innovates
- Type: Provincial Research Council
- Headquarters: Edmonton, Alberta, Canada
- Region served: Alberta
- Official language: English
- Website: https://albertainnovates.ca/
- Formerly called: Research Council of Alberta (RCA)

Alberta Innovates (AI) is a Canadian provincial crown corporation created and funded by the Government of Alberta, responsible for promoting innovation in the province. Its appointed board of directors is accountable through provincial legislation and policy to the minister responsible.

AI was created from a variety of predecessor research and development organizations including the Alberta Research Council, the Alberta Heritage Foundation for Medical Research and the Alberta Energy Research Institute.

== History ==
=== Scientific and Industrial Research Council of Alberta (SIRCA) ===
In the early 1900s, Henry Marshall Tory, the first president of the University of Alberta, lobbied the Alberta government to create an organization to promote research and development (R&D) in the province.

In 1921, the government created the Scientific and Industrial Research Council of Alberta (SIRCA). SIRCA was the first provincial R&D organization in Canada. SIRCA's mandate was to "inventory and promote development of natural resources.". Advocacy by University of Alberta president Henry Marshall Tory helped prompt the council’s creation.

Notably, Tory recruited a chemist, Karl Clark, as the first full-time research professor to lead SIRCA's road-building research division. Clark's research focused on the potential to use bitumen as a paving material and eventually lead to the development of the Alberta oil sands. The City of Edmonton honored Clark as an Edmontonian of the Century for his process to separate oil from oilsands which is still in use today and for the impact it made to Edmonton who benefits from northern projects.

During this period, SIRCA also completed the first geological survey of Alberta.

=== Research Council of Alberta (RCA) ===
In 1930, the organization was reconstituted as the Research Council of Alberta through provincial legislations. During the Great Depression, the province temporarily cut all funding for the organization and was governed by the University of Alberta

=== Alberta Research Council (ARC) ===
In 1981, the RCA was renamed again to the Alberta Research Council (ARC) and expanded its research focus beyond Alberta's oil sands. The organization also opened a new state-of-the-art research facility and headquarters in Edmonton.

=== Alberta Innovates (AI) ===
In January 2010, the provincial government merged ARC and other research and development organizations including the Alberta Heritage Foundation for Medical Research and the Alberta Energy Research Institute to form a set of Alberta Innovates (AI) companies.

On November 1, 2016, AI consolidated the four corporations into one singular Alberta Innovates company with two subsidiaries: C-FER Technologies and InnoTech Alberta.

Since 1921, InnoTech Alberta and its former organizations (Alberta Research Council and Alberta Innovates - Technology Futures) have been Canada's premier applied research organization.

In 2021, Alberta Innovates marked its 100-year centennial.
