= The McNeil Medal =

Canadian award

McNeil Medal
- Awarded for: Public awareness of science in Canada
- Sponsored by: McNeil Consumer Healthcare
- Country: Canada
- Presented by: Royal Society of Canada
- Rewards: Bronze medallion and C$1,500
- First award: 1991

The McNeil Medal for public awareness of science was established by the Royal Society of Canada (RSC) in 1991 with support from McNeil Consumer Healthcare. It recognized outstanding contributions to communicating science to the public and students within Canada. The award took the form of a bronze medallion and cash in the amount of $1,500.00 (CDN) before it was discontinued in 2016.

Winners during the medal's history included leading academics in a range of disciplines as well as Canadian media figures such as David Suzuki, Jay Ingram, and Bob McDonald.
