= Office for Science and Society =

Canada-based science education group

- Abbreviation: OSS
- Formation: 1999
- Founders: Joseph Schwarcz; David Harpp; Ariel Fenster
- Purpose: Science education
- Location: Montreal, Quebec, Canada
- Methods: Academic courses; public outreach
- Director: Joseph Schwarcz
- Parent organization: McGill University
- Website: mcgill.ca/oss
- Formerly called: Office for Chemistry and Society

The Office for Science and Society (OSS) is an organization dedicated to science education, operating from Montreal's McGill University. Its staff and contributors use courses, mass media, special events and books to debunk pseudo-scientific myths and improve scientific literacy.

== History ==
The organization was founded in 1999 as the Office for Chemistry and Society by chemistry professors Joseph Schwarcz, David Harpp, and Ariel Fenster, with Schwarcz heading the office. The name was changed to indicate its wider focus. Both its public education role and the wide range of covered topics were explicit from the beginning:

This unique office will be dedicated to disseminating up-to-date information in the areas of food, food issues, medications, cosmetics and health topics in general. Information from the Office will be directed towards the public, educators and students. Extensive use will be made of radio, television, the press, private consultations, public lectures, the classroom and the Internet.

The office pioneered the COursesOnline (COOL McGill) system, an initiative that started in 2000 with three professors and two programmers and now provides online versions of 350 courses.

The office is funded by McGill University. In 2011, the office received a $5.5-million grant from the Lorne Trottier Family Foundation. It received the 2024 award from the James Randi Educational Foundation.

== Current status ==
The OSS conducts public education activities: via Educational presentations on scientific topics, Radio and television appearances, YouTube videos, Newspaper columns, and its Annual Trottier Public Science Symposium.

The OSS was the recipient of the 2015 Science Promotion Prize by the Canadian Council of University Biology Chairs.

Jonathan Jarry is a science communicator for OSS.

With the proliferation of misleading or fraudulent health information online, the organization added the production of internet videos to its public communication activities. One video gained international attention in July 2018, when it got promoted by skeptics with a large online presence such as David Gorski, Susan Gerbic and Kavin Senapathy, as well as comedian Scott Rogowsky, and quickly reached 10 million hits. Imitating the format of others that promote false cures for cancer, the OSS video tells of a medical discovery by one Johan R. Tarjany (an anagram of Jonathan Jarry) before inviting the watcher to be skeptical and to ask questions.

In 2019, Jarry and the OSS released a survey of 150 Montreal pharmacies, finding that 2/3 carried a pseudoscientific and ineffective homeopathic flu remedy called Oscillococcinum.

Public interventions by the OSS have attracted criticism from practitioners of alternative medicine, especially homeopaths, accusing the OSS of ignoring supposed evidence that these treatments would produce results exceeding the placebo effect.
