= Ariel Fenster =

French-born Canadian chemist (1943–2026)

- Born: Ariel Elie Fenster; April 18, 1943; Bergerac, German-occupied France
- Died: August 20, 2026 (aged 83); Montreal, Quebec, Canada
- Resting place: Mount Royal Cemetery
- Education: University of Paris; McGill University
- Awards: Michael Smith Award for the Promotion of Science (2005); Raymond Gervais Award for Exceptional Contribution to Science Education (1999)
- Scientific career
- Fields: Chemistry
- Thesis: Synthetic, spectroscopic, and kinetic studies of some -cyclopentadienylmetal complexes (1972)
- Doctoral advisor: Ian S. Butler

Ariel Elie Fenster (April 18, 1943 – August 20, 2026) was a French-born Canadian science educator, chemist and founding member of McGill University's Office for Science and Society. Fenster lectured extensively in both French and English on topics of health, the environment, and technology. He was a frequent television and radio presenter on science-related subjects.

== Early life and education ==
Fenster's parents Hersh and Léa raised young Ariel in Paris. He survived the Holocaust and enrolled at the University of Paris, where he completed a bachelor of science in mathematics, physics, and chemistry in 1966 as well as a master of science in theoretical and physical chemistry in 1967. Moving to Montreal, he obtained in 1973 his doctor of philosophy in physical and inorganic chemistry from McGill University.

== Career ==
Fenster began teaching at McGill University in 1982. While a professor at McGill, he also taught at both Dawson College from 1974 to 1984 and Vanier College from 1985 to 2003.

He taught that science is relevant to people's everyday life: "By teaching the chemistry of everyday life, I feel we play an important role in people's lives. We're more scared now we've ever been because we're bombarded with information – too much information. Through our courses, we try to provide people with useful information. Balanced information. We want people to understand that everything they do involves risk. We risk death by driving to work in the morning, but we take that risk because we know exactly how dangerous it is. With food, drugs and the environment, people don't have that same information."

By teaching the chemistry of everyday life, I feel we play an important role in people's lives.

— Ariel Fenster

After his retirement from teaching, Fenster remained active in science education. Throughout his career, he had given more than 800 public lectures, in English and in French, making science accessible through topics such as the chemistry of wine, cooking and art forgery.

== Death ==
Fenster died in Montreal on August 20, 2026, at the age of 83.

== Selected awards ==
Year	Award
1989	Catalyst Award for Excellence in Chemistry Teaching, United States Chemical Manufacturers Association.
1990	Award for Outstanding Contribution to Chemical Education, College Chemistry Canada.
1992	McNeil Medal for the Public Awareness of Science, Royal Society of Canada.
1999	Raymond Gervais Award for Exceptional Contribution to Science Education, Quebec Association of Science Teachers.
2005	Michael Smith Award for the Promotion of Science, Natural Sciences and Engineering Council of Canada.
