= Vaccine Confidence Project =

International vaccination information project

- Nickname: VCP
- Formation: 2010
- Purpose: To monitor public confidence in vaccines
- Headquarters: London School of Hygiene & Tropical Medicine's Vaccine Centre
- Director: Heidi Larson
- Board of directors: Heidi Larson, Pierre Van Damme, Leesa Lin
- Website: www.vaccineconfidence.org

The Vaccine Confidence Project (VCP) founded in 2010 by Heidi Larson, was developed in response to hesitancy and misinformation on vaccination programmes such as those that caused a boycott of polio eradication efforts in Northern Nigeria in 2003–04. It is an early warning system to identify and evaluate public confidence in vaccines, with the purpose of tackling the problem early, when it is likely to be manageable.

Housed in the London School of Hygiene & Tropical Medicine's Vaccine Centre, the VCP uses a diagnostic tool that finds what sparks vaccine rumours, examines and evaluates what spreads those rumours and calculates the potential impact. It is a member of the Vaccine Safety Net, a project led by the World Health Organization.

== Origins ==
The vaccine confidence project was founded in 2010 by Heidi Larson, and developed in response to rumours and misinformation about vaccines such as those that caused a boycott of polio eradication efforts in Northern Nigeria in 2003–04. It is housed in the London School of Hygiene & Tropical Medicine's Vaccine Centre. Among industry funders, the project is supported by vaccine manufacturers GlaxoSmithKline, Merck & Co., and Johnson & Johnson, as well as by the European Federation of Pharmaceutical Industries & Associations, and the industry-funded Innovative Medicines Initiative.

== Purpose ==
The purpose of the project is to monitor public confidence in immunisation programmes by building an information surveillance system for early detection of public concerns around vaccines.

The VCP is an early-warning system which identifies and evaluates public confidence in vaccines, with monitoring capabilities in some 63 languages. It aims at tackling problems early, when they are likely to be manageable, because as Larson explains: "early detection of and timely response to vaccine rumours can prevent loss of public confidence in immunization". It then aims to inform policy-makers of its findings.

== The toolkit ==
The VCP uses a diagnostic tool that finds what sparks vaccine rumours, examines and evaluates what spreads those rumours and calculates the potential impact.

=== Rumour diagnostic tool ===
I. Rumour Prompters ("the triggers")	II. Sustaining and amplifying factors	III. Outcome and impact
Media and social media reports	Geographic spread	Vaccine refusals (or refusal of other disease control intervention)
News research	Frequency of rumour reported	Vaccine is suspended (often fuelling more anxiety and rumours)
New product	Historic bad experience that lowers public trust	
New recommendation or policy change	Media reports	Vaccine-preventable disease outbreaks
Adverse event following immunization	Socioeconomic marginalization	
Political motivations	Previous existence of self-organized community groups	

Source: Larson presentation, 13 December 2016.

== Research ==
The VCP is a member of the Vaccine Safety Net, a project led by the World Health Organization. Its researchers and team members include anthropologists, digital analysts, epidemiologists and psychologists. In 2011, research by the VCP found that refusal to vaccinate against polio increased in the Taliban dominant areas of Balochistan and FATA following rumours about the polio eradication programmes, triggered by the story of the CIA's fake immunisation campaign in the search for Bin Laden. In spring of 2020, the VCP carried out a survey of people's attitudes to a COVID-19 vaccine. The following September, in The Lancet, the VCP published the largest known study on vaccine confidence modelling. The study looked at data on the importance, efficacy and safety of vaccines in 290 national surveys of 284,381 adults in 149 countries, and found wide variation around the world.
