= Freedom Angels Foundation =

American anti-vaccination group

- Type: Advocacy organization
- Location: California
- Co-founder: Denise Aguilar
- Co-founder: Heidi Muñoz Gleisner
- Co-founder: Tara Thornton
- Website: www.freedom-angels.org

Freedom Angels Foundation is an anti-vaccination group in California. Initially constituted in an attempt to counter the state's new vaccination laws in 2019, the group is playing a major role in protests against the public measures enacted in relation to the COVID-19 pandemic, joining far-right groups in the protests against lockdowns and the defeat of Donald Trump in 2020.

== Foundation ==
Freedom Angels was founded in 2019 by three women who met at protests against the tightening of California's vaccination regulations: Denise Aguilar, Heidi Muñoz Gleisner and Tara Thornton. They organized daily protests against California Senate Bill 277 for a week and disrupted public hearings.

The group's efforts were ultimately unsuccessful, as they failed to gather the 600,000 signatures necessary to force a popular initiative referendum on the issue after the legislation was adopted.

== COVID-19 protests and associated groups ==
In 2020, the group organized and participated in several protests against stay-at-home instructions and other measures put in place to protect the population against COVID-19, such as the use of masks in public buildings. The group specifically called on its members to ignore instructions from health authorities about the pandemic and has positioned itself against a possible vaccine. The rallies were initially held in front of the California State Capitol, but other locations had to be chosen after the California Highway Patrol announced on April 22 that it would stop issuing permits for protests at the Capitol and other government buildings.

Like other anti-vaccination groups, Freedom Angels latched onto the movement against COVID-19 restrictions in order to gain visibility and increase its fundraising capabilities, in the opinion of Democratic state senator Richard Pan, who authored California's vaccine laws.

The group has organized protests at the home of several of the public health officials who are implementing measures to protect the population against COVID-19. Their interventions, both online and in person, have been cited as a cause of an unprecedented amount of aggressive behaviour and death threats against local and regional health officers. Several people who were targeted by these public attacks resigned, citing concerns about their family's safety, such as the chief health officer for Orange County Nichole Quick. Reacting to the death threats, Facebook removed from their platform several videos posted by the group.

Commenting specifically about the actions of Freedom Angels, the Los Angeles Times Editorial Board wrote: "They say they want medical freedom, but to us it sounds more like they want the freedom to do whatever they want, pandemic be damned, even if it means other people might get sick or die because of their actions. (...) The pandemic restriction protesters are loud and persistent, but a core group of them are merely rebels in search of a cause, any cause, to push their nutty theories. And they found one with COVID-19."

Freedom Angels became involved with the attempt to force a recall of Governor Gavin Newsom, but because of their hard-right turn, the organizers of the initiative cut ties with them. The group became close to far-right groups and was frequently involved in the protests supporting Donald Trump after he lost the 2020 election. Aguilar and Thornton in particular took a portion of the group toward more extreme positions, with Aguilar openly supporting the Proud Boys and trying to organize an all-women militia (named Mamalitia) promoting survivalism and alternative medicine. In the Fall of 2021, Aguilar added the San Joaquin County Liberty Coalition to the list of group she oversees.

Aguilar participated in the violent protest at the Capitol on January 6, 2021.

== See also ==
- Polio eradication
- Science Moms
- Vaccine hesitancy
