= Stop Mandatory Vaccination =

Anti-vaccination website and Facebook group

The Stop Mandatory Vaccination website and associated Facebook group are some of the major hubs of the American anti-vaccination movement. It was established by anti-vaccination activist Larry Cook in 2015.

== Reach ==
The total membership of the public Facebook page and the private group reached 360,000 before it got closed down in November 2020. The website is owned by Larry Cook, who describes himself as a "healthy lifestyle advocate." A former sound technician and Executive Director of the California Naturopathic Doctors Association, he first used social media platforms to promote conspiracy theories and ineffective treatments for autism before he became a leader of the anti-vaccination movement although he has no medical background. He created the site in 2015, in reaction to California limiting exemptions to vaccination requirements in schools.

Members used the Facebook group to disseminate conspiracy theories, for example stating that news about epidemics are manufactured by governments to incite people to vaccinate, that the public health measures taken to minimize the impact of the COVID-19 pandemic aim at preparing mass forced vaccination or that the 1918 influenza epidemic was caused by vaccines. During the COVID-19 pandemic, Cook used the group to oppose mask-wearing legislation in certain situations. Cook wrote that opposing mask-wearing is a precondition to opposing COVID-19 vaccines when they would become available.

Both Facebook and Twitter removed the Stop Mandatory Vaccination accounts from their platform in November 2020, as part of their measures to limit the spread of QAnon misinformation. After losing his Facebook presence, Cook created a website specifically about COVID-19, Qanon and parenting, but it has been growing slowly.

During the 2022 monkeypox outbreak, Cook used his constellation of social media channels to spreads misinformation about the disease.

== Interaction with grieving parents ==
The Facebook group was at the center of a controversy over the death of a four-year-old boy whose mother asked for advice from group members, rather than getting the Tamiflu (which can reduce symptoms and duration of flu) that she had been prescribed by a health professional for a bout of Influenza that left him feverish and experiencing seizures. The advice that she received pointed to various ineffective treatments popular with naturopaths, such as breastmilk, thyme, and elderberry. The child was later hospitalized and died.

Along with other anti-vaccination activists like Andrew Wakefield and Del Bigtree, he seeks to use testimonies of parents who lost young children to causes such as sudden infant death syndrome and accidental asphyxiation but became convinced that vaccines were really to blame for the tragedy. Stop Mandatory Vaccination circulates a number of those stories, which are highly effective at growing both the revenues of both the anti-vaccination movement and the website. In some cases, grieving parents are contacted online by anti-vaccination activists, who suggest their infant's death to be linked to vaccination, and they then share links to the website or Facebook group.

The Facebook group has been used by anti-vaccination activists to identify and issue threats against parents who encourage other parents to have their children vaccinated and to feed intimidation campaigns, which are waged on social media. Grieving parents who discuss how their children died from complication of preventable diseases such as the flu report intimidation by anti-vaccination activists. Doctors who promote vaccination online are also targeted. Cook says that he does not condone such attacks, but people promoting vaccination "can expect push back and resistance."

In 2020, Cook created a more overtly-political group, Medical Freedom Patriots. The anti-vaccine group supports the Republican Party and aims at putting pressure on elected officials by mobilizing a far-right target audience.

Cook claims that he received threats because of his online activities and that members of the Facebook group were visited by police officers.

== Funding and advertising ==
Cook funds the site by donations, advertising, and the sales of his own book and of t-shirts. Since 2015, he has raised more than $100,000 through GoFundMe campaigns, which he used to buy Facebook ads bringing parents to his Facebook group. Other donations come in through PayPal, website advertising, and his Amazon storefront, where he gets a portion of the sales of the anti-vaccination literature that he recommends. In 2019, revenue from his YouTube account dried up since the company stopped running advertising on anti-vaccination videos, and he had to find other platforms after GoFundMe canceled his account.

Cook advertises that donations fund anti-vaccination initiatives, but the money is directed to his personal bank account and serves to pay his personal expenses.

A study found that Stop Mandatory Vaccination was one of the major buyers of anti-vaccine Facebook advertising in December 2018 and February 2019, the other being Children's Health Defense. Heavily targeting women and young couples, the advertising campaign highlighted the alleged risks of vaccines and asked for donations. Advertising purchases by both groups contribute to vaccine hesitancy and ultimately to epidemics.

According to an analysis by NBC News, the group is one of three major sources of false claims on vaccination shared on the internet, the others being both the fake news site Natural News and Children's Health Defense.

In 2018, after it followed up on a parent complaint, the British Advertising Standards Authority had Facebook ads from Stop Mandatory Vaccination taken down for making misleading claims and causing "undue distress." The messages said that vaccines kill children and that doctors often report those death as sudden infant death syndrome.
