= Renée DiResta =

Writer and internet researcher

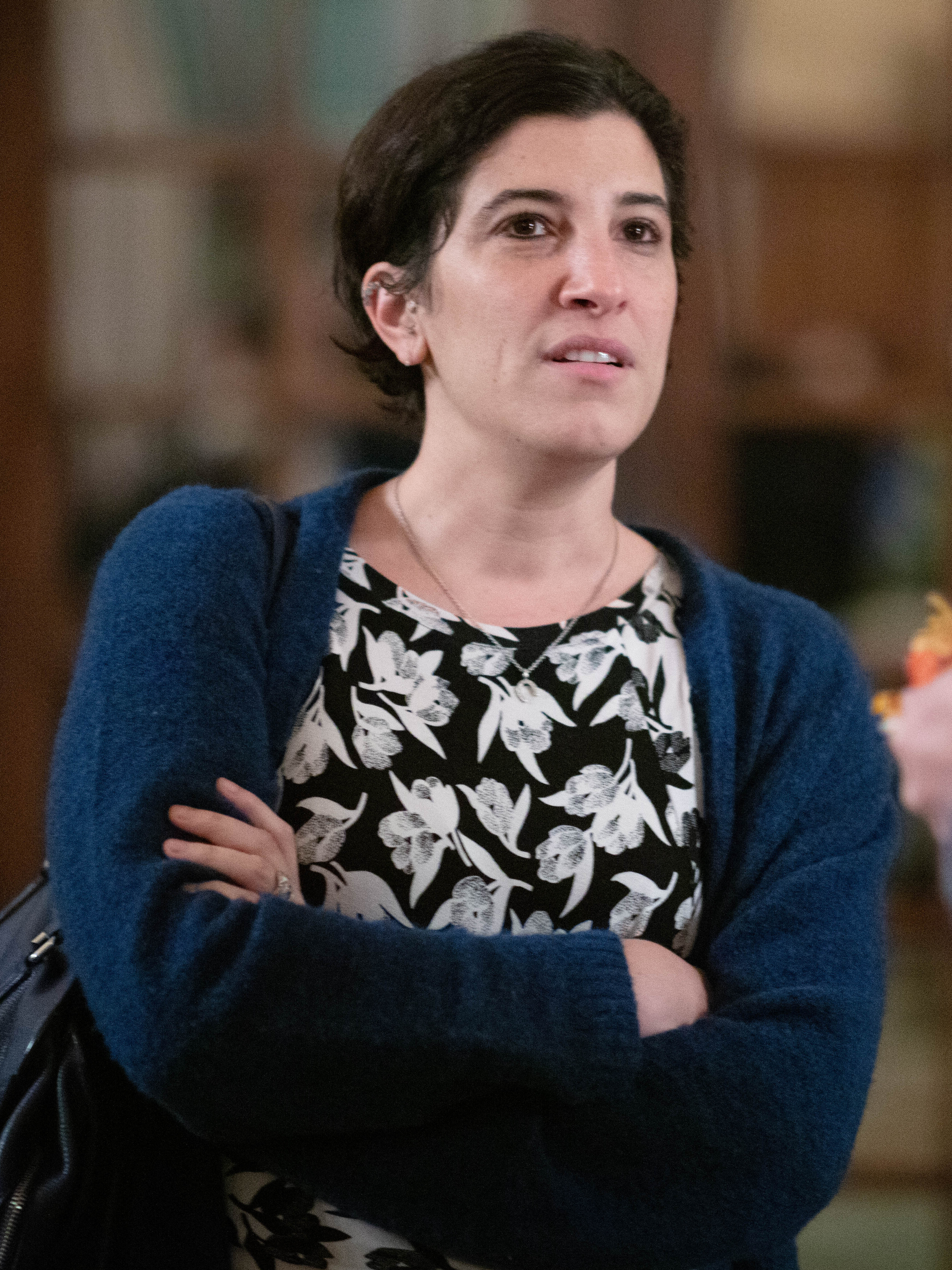
- DiResta in 2022
- Born: 1981 (age 44–45)
- Education: Stony Brook University
- Occupation: Associate research professor
- Employer: Georgetown University McCourt School of Public Policy
- Website: www.reneediresta.com

Renée DiResta (born 1981) is an American professor, writer and former research manager at Stanford Internet Observatory (SIO). DiResta has written about pseudoscience, conspiracy theories, terrorism, and state-sponsored information warfare. She has also served as an advisor to the U.S. Congress on ongoing efforts to prevent online and social media disinformation.

== Education and career ==
DiResta attended Stony Brook University and in 2004 received a Bachelor of Science in computer science and political science. DiResta has stated that as an undergraduate student she worked as an intern for the CIA, but that her association with that agency ended in 2004.

In 2015, DiResta co-founded Vaccinate California, an organization designed to promote vaccination in California. Until June 2024, DiResta was the Technical Research Manager for the Stanford Internet Observatory.

=== Vaccination misinformation research ===
DiResta has advised the California State Senate on matters of vaccination misinformation. Following an outbreak of measles in the U.S., DiResta began research into misinformation around vaccines. Along with data scientist Gilad Lotan, DiResta identified that on Twitter, 25% of anti-vaccine information came from 0.6% of users, in a phenomenon DiResta described as similar to automation. This study additionally identified groups of individuals who would actively create false accounts and "shape public opinion about particular policies". This report was used by Vaccinate California and the California State Senate to demonstrate that the majority of Californians were in favor of removal of vaccine opt-out policies, resulting in California Senate Bill 277 passing into law.

In 2021, the Virality Project, an organization DiResta is a part of, released the report "Memes, Magnets and Microchips: Narrative dynamics around COVID-19 vaccines" advising social media sites and health officials on how to counter COVID-19 and vaccine misinformation.

=== Social media and disinformation research ===
DiResta has previously written that social media sites, such as Facebook, Twitter, and Reddit, are used as "useful testing grounds for bad actors". Specifically, she wrote that foreign governments, such as Russia, will pilot memes and false stories online to see what can become popular and sway public opinion. DiResta described it as "the asymmetry of passion" where extremist groups will intentionally attempt to reinforce narratives to "shape the reality" of viewers. This, according to DiResta, can "seep into public policy debates on matters such as vaccines, zoning laws and water fluoridation".

During her tenure at the Stanford Internet Observatory, DiResta led investigations into the Russian Internet Research Agency's efforts to manipulate United States society and the GRU's efforts to influence the U.S. 2016 Presidential Election. This included a report to the United States Senate Select Committee on Intelligence (SSCI), detailing the means by which the GRU used social media to influence the election and how social media poses an ongoing risk to US politics. This report further stated that Facebook, Twitter and Alphabet's algorithms were intentionally manipulated in a multi-year effort by the Internet Research Agency, directed by the Russian government, and had successfully created false personas that spread misinformation to an estimated hundreds of thousands of Americans. The identified purpose of this effort was to "deepen political divisions".

As of 2022, DiResta is a member of the Council for Responsible Social Media, a project of the campaign reform lobbying group Issue One. She has criticized Mark Zuckerberg's controlling share of Meta and Elon Musk's acquisition of Twitter, calling for greater transparency and accountability for these sites.

While at Stanford, DiResta also worked on misinformation about elections such as election fraud in the United States. The investigation of election misinformation and disinformation was shut down in 2024 as a result of lawsuits, subpoenas, document requests from right-wing politicians and non-profits that cost millions to defend, even when vindicated by the US Supreme Court in June 2024, in addition to threats and online harassment as a result of the spread of disinformation about her work.

On 8 October 2024, it was announced that she had been appointed to the position of associate research professor at McCourt School of Public Policy at Georgetown University.

=== Recommendations for countering rumors, misinformation and disinformation online ===
In her 2024 book Invisible Rulers, DiResta argued for the following changes to improve the quality of the information environment:

1. Changing the defaults on social media. Currently algorithms reward engagement which elevates emotion and conflict, but could instead reward accuracy, civility, and other values.
2. More user control to customize their experience on a platform.
3. More friction would give time for fact-checking and context before content goes viral.
4. Education. The Institute for Propaganda Analysis was an education and research effort from 1937–1942 that DiResta found effective and ahead of its time.

=== Media appearances ===
DiResta appeared in the 2020 docudrama The Social Dilemma and is a contributor at Wired and The Atlantic.

== Books ==
- Invisible Rulers: The People Who Turn Lies into Reality (2024)
- The Hardware Startup: Building your Product, Business, and Brand (2015)

== See also ==
- Twitter files
