= Vaccine law =

Field of law governing vaccines and vaccination

Vaccine law, also known as vaccination law or immunization law, is a field of law concerning the development, testing, approval, manufacture, distribution, financing, administration, and use of vaccines, as well as legal responsibility for vaccine-related injuries and governmental policies concerning vaccination. It draws on multiple areas of law, including administrative law, public health law, intellectual property law, tort law, constitutional law, and health law. Vaccine law encompasses legal questions arising throughout the life cycle of a vaccine, from initial research and clinical trials through approval, production, distribution, administration, safety monitoring, and potential injury compensation, often with special rules to be implemented in response to public health emergencies.

Vaccination policy is a related field concerned particularly with decisions about recommending, promoting, providing, or requiring vaccination. Vaccine law also encompasses legal frameworks governing the vaccines themselves, independently of policies concerning their use.

== Scope ==
The scope of vaccine law extends beyond vaccination mandates and other measures intended to increase vaccination rates. It includes the legal conditions under which vaccines are developed and marketed, the rights and responsibilities of manufacturers and healthcare providers, and the mechanisms through which governments and other institutions make vaccines available to the public. Hargan and colleagues have described the field in terms of the regulatory framework governing the production, procurement, distribution, and administration of vaccines, as well as liability arising from their use. Yang and Reiss examine these subjects alongside the legal treatment of vaccination requirements, vaccine safety, intellectual property, and public health policy.

Areas within the field include:

- Regulation of vaccine clinical trials
- Vaccine licensure, as an aspect of regulation of therapeutic goods
- Vaccine intellectual property, primarily patents
- Vaccine equity; Vaccine access, funding and distribution
- Vaccination mandates and exemptions
- Vaccine injury compensation
- Legal responses to vaccine misinformation

The COVID-19 pandemic brought renewed attention to these issues, including emergency authorization of vaccines, the allocation of initially limited supplies, government vaccination requirements, and the legal treatment of injuries attributed to emergency countermeasures.

=== Development, regulation, and intellectual property protection ===
The development and approval of vaccines are governed by laws regulating clinical research, pharmaceutical products, and biological products. These laws establish requirements for testing vaccine safety and efficacy, obtaining authorization to market vaccines, maintaining manufacturing standards, and monitoring safety after authorization. Legal requirements governing vaccine research include informed consent, the protection of human research participants, oversight of clinical trials, and the collection and reporting of research results. Research involving vaccine candidates may raise additional questions concerning the use of control groups, the participation of minors and other vulnerable populations, the recruitment of sufficiently representative trial participants, and liability for injuries or misconduct during clinical research.

Regulatory agencies also oversee vaccine manufacturing, labeling, advertising, and postmarketing surveillance. In the United States, the Food and Drug Administration regulates human vaccines under the Federal Food, Drug, and Cosmetic Act and the Public Health Service Act. The agency may inspect manufacturing facilities, impose product requirements, and take enforcement action for violations of applicable law. Special regulatory pathways may permit access to vaccines that have not received ordinary marketing approval. In the United States, an emergency use authorization may permit the use of certain medical products during a qualifying public health emergency, subject to statutory conditions. Legal systems often provide mechanisms to accelerate the development or regulatory review of vaccines intended to prevent serious diseases, including expedited development and review procedures, such as fast-track designation and priority review, as well as accelerated approval based on qualifying evidence.

Intellectual property protections for vaccines, and the technologies used in their development and production, are intended to incentivize advances in the field by securing for their inventors the right to profit from their inventions. These include patents for vaccine compositions, components, manufacturing processes, and methods of use, as well as trade secrets and, to a lesser extent, trademarks.

Public funding of vaccine research can affect ownership and licensing of resulting inventions. In the United States, the Bayh–Dole Act permits certain recipients of federal research funding to retain patent rights while reserving specified rights for the federal government. These include authority, under certain conditions, to require licensing of federally funded inventions to other parties. Also, under 28 U.S.C. § 1498, the federal government may use patented inventions without obtaining the patent holder's permission, subject to an obligation to provide compensation. These provisions become relevant when patent rights affect the affordability or availability of vaccines.

=== Financing, distribution, and access ===
Vaccine law addresses the financing of vaccine research, procurement, distribution, and administration, including government purchasing programs, insurance coverage, and charitable initiatives. Public financing may support both the development of new vaccines and access to existing vaccines. Legal questions also arise concerning the authority of healthcare professionals to prescribe and administer vaccines, consent to vaccination, and access for populations dependent on institutional or governmental assistance.

The allocation of limited vaccine supplies raises additional questions concerning equality, public health priorities, and administrative decision-making. In a 2021 examination of COVID-19 vaccine distribution, legal scholars Kristen Underhill and Olatunde C. A. Johnson argued that allocation and appointment systems had contributed to racial, ethnic, and socioeconomic disparities in early vaccine access. They proposed regulatory measures to address such disparities, including more specific federal guidance, data reporting, and distribution arrangements designed to serve underserved communities.

Questions of vaccine equity extend beyond whether a vaccine is legally available or publicly funded. They include whether distribution policies, geographic availability, eligibility requirements, and administrative procedures allow different populations to obtain vaccination in practice.

=== Vaccination mandates ===
==== Public mandates and exemptions ====
Vaccination requirements may be imposed by governments as a condition of attending school, entering particular professions, serving in the military, or participating in other activities. Some laws require individuals to receive specified vaccines, while others direct institutions to offer or make vaccination available to certain populations.

In the United States, the United States Supreme Court upheld a compulsory smallpox vaccination law in Jacobson v. Massachusetts (1905). In Zucht v. King (1922), the Court upheld the exclusion of unvaccinated students from schools. These decisions became important precedents concerning governmental authority to impose vaccination requirements for public health purposes. States exercise general police powers to protect public health, subject to constitutional limitations, while federal vaccination requirements must be supported by one or more of the powers granted to the federal government by the Constitution. Potential bases for federal action include the Spending Clause and Commerce Clause, although the use of these powers is subject to constitutional restrictions. Disputes over governmental vaccination requirements may therefore involve both individual rights and questions concerning the allocation of authority between federal and state governments. In Europe, the 2021 case of Vavřička and Others v. the Czech Republic, decided by the European Court of Human Rights (ECtHR), held that the nation of the Czech Republic did not violate the European Convention on Human Rights by imposing a vaccination mandate on children in that country.

The availability of exemptions from vaccination requirements differs among jurisdictions. Medical exemptions generally concern circumstances in which vaccination would be medically contraindicated or pose a particular risk to the recipient. Other common exemptions concern religious beliefs or nonreligious philosophical objections. Legal disputes have addressed whether exemptions are constitutionally required, whether a claimed belief qualifies under an exemption statute, who may certify an exemption, and whether exempt individuals may be excluded from certain settings during outbreaks.

==== Employment and private vaccination requirements ====
Private employers and other institutions may establish vaccination requirements independently of governmental vaccination mandates. These requirements raise legal questions concerning employment law, occupational safety and health, collective bargaining, and protections against discrimination.

In the United States, the Occupational Safety and Health Administration requires certain employers to offer hepatitis B vaccination to workers with occupational exposure to bloodborne pathogens. Employer vaccination policies may also be subject to the Americans with Disabilities Act of 1990 and Title VII of the Civil Rights Act of 1964, including requirements for reasonable accommodation in applicable circumstances. In unionized workplaces, vaccination policies have been held to implicate obligations under the National Labor Relations Act of 1935.

=== Vaccine safety surveillance and adverse-event reporting ===
Requirements for reporting and investigating adverse events occurring after vaccination forms part of the practice of pharmacovigilance, the continuing monitoring of medical products after authorization. The World Health Organization uses the term adverse event following immunization (AEFI) to describe events occurring after vaccination, which may result from the vaccine itself, defects in its manufacture, errors in administration, or causes unrelated to vaccination. An adverse-event report does not necessarily establish that vaccination caused the reported condition. National legal systems vary in their adverse-event reporting requirements. Some countries have reporting systems specifically designed for vaccines, while others incorporate vaccine-related events into broader systems for reporting adverse reactions to medical products.

In the United States, the Vaccine Adverse Event Reporting System (VAERS), jointly administered by the Food and Drug Administration and the Centers for Disease Control and Prevention, collects reports of medical events occurring after vaccination. Healthcare providers and vaccine manufacturers are legally required to report certain events, while patients and other individuals may submit reports voluntarily. VAERS is a passive surveillance system intended to identify possible safety signals requiring further investigation. Because reports may be incomplete, unverified, or coincidental, the reports alone cannot establish causation or reliably measure the incidence of vaccine injuries.

Other surveillance methods supplement passive reporting. The Vaccine Safety Datalink, for example, uses healthcare data to investigate possible associations between vaccination and subsequent medical conditions. Findings from vaccine safety surveillance may lead regulators to require further studies, revise product labeling, issue safety communications, or take other regulatory action. The distinction between an event reported after vaccination and an injury legally attributable to vaccination is also relevant to vaccine injury compensation. Compensation programs may establish separate requirements for proving causation, including presumptions applicable to specified injuries, which differ from the standards used to report suspected adverse events.

=== Vaccine injury liability and compensation ===
In very rare instances, vaccination may cause injury, and legal systems differ in how claims of vaccine-related injury are resolved. Ordinarily, such claims are governed by product liability, medical malpractice, or other principles of tort law. In some jurisdictions, however, no-fault compensation programs have been established, which generally provide compensation for qualifying vaccine injuries without requiring claimants to prove negligence by manufacturers or healthcare providers.

In the United States, Congress established the National Vaccine Injury Compensation Program (NVICP) through the National Childhood Vaccine Injury Act of 1986. The legislation responded to concerns that vaccine-related litigation threatened childhood vaccine supplies while ordinary tort litigation could be costly, lengthy, and uncertain for persons seeking compensation. Claims under the NVICP are filed in the United States Court of Federal Claims and initially decided by special masters. The program provides for compensation for certain injuries identified in a Vaccine Injury Table, while allowing claims involving other injuries upon the required showing of probable causation. The statutory scheme also places limitations on the circumstances under which claimants may pursue civil litigation against vaccine manufacturers or administrators. The NVICP is only applicable to vaccines listed on the table, which includes those routinely recommended for children. It therefore does not include vaccines that are rarely administered in the United States, such as the rabies vaccine, tuberculosis vaccine, or yellow fever vaccine, nor for vaccines exclusively administered to adults, such as the shingles vaccine.

No-fault compensation systems differ internationally. A comparative study published in 2020 identified differences among existing programs in eligibility, funding, decision-making procedures, standards for establishing causation, and the relationship between compensation claims and ordinary civil litigation. Separate legal regimes may govern vaccines used during declared public health emergencies. In the United States, the Public Readiness and Emergency Preparedness Act authorizes liability protections for designated medical countermeasures, including qualifying vaccines, their manufacturers, distributors, and administrators. The Act also provides a limited exception to immunity for specified willful misconduct and establishes the Countermeasures Injury Compensation Program as a separate mechanism for compensating qualifying injuries. This program differs from the NVICP in its statutory basis, coverage, eligibility requirements, and available benefits.

=== Anti-vaccine activity and legal responses ===
Opposition to vaccination has generated legal disputes concerning the authority of governments and private institutions to require vaccination, the availability and application of exemptions, and the regulation of vaccines. Opponents of vaccination have challenged laws and administrative actions on constitutional, statutory, and procedural grounds, including claims involving individual liberty, religious freedom, and the limits of governmental authority. The legal treatment of challenges to vaccination requirements depends in part on the source of the requirement. Challenges to governmental mandates may involve constitutional or other protections, and questions regarding the authority delegated to public officials, while disputes over private vaccination policies may concern employment discrimination, collective bargaining agreements, or the interpretation of institutional rules. Courts have distinguished challenges to the general validity of vaccination requirements from claims that particular requirements were imposed without sufficient legal authority or that an available exemption was improperly denied.

Legal responses to vaccine misinformation raise separate questions involving freedom of speech, consumer protection, and the professional regulation of healthcare providers. The regulation of false or misleading vaccine-related statements may depend on whether the statements constitute ordinary political expression, commercial advertising, or professional conduct. Disputes have also concerned government communications promoting vaccination and the moderation of vaccine-related content by private online platforms. Conduct associated with opposition to vaccination may also give rise to civil or criminal liability independently of the expression of anti-vaccination views. During the COVID-19 pandemic, the falsification of vaccination cards and immunization records led to criminal investigations and prosecutions in several countries. Other controversies have involved fraudulent exemption documentation and alleged violations of legal duties concerning the prevention of infectious disease.

Law professor Dorit Rubinstein Reiss has proposed that parents who do not vaccinate their children should be liable if their child transmits a vaccine-preventable disease to other people. In 2015, Reiss and coauthors Charlotte A. Moser and Robert L. Schwartz published a paper with the title ″Funding the Costs of Disease Outbreaks Caused by Non Vaccination″, in which they propose the creation of a no-fault fund paid by parents who refuse to vaccinate their children. This fund would act as a tax which would cover the public health costs generated as a consequence of non-vaccination. Another alternative would be billing parents if it is determined that their failure to vaccinate caused an outbreak of a vaccine-preventable disease.

=== International and comparative vaccine law ===
Vaccine research, manufacturing, distribution, and public health programs frequently cross national borders. International legal issues include the importation and regulation of vaccines, intellectual property rights, access to vaccine supplies, international travel requirements, and the coordination of vaccination programs by governments and international organizations. The World Health Organization, UNICEF, and Gavi, the Vaccine Alliance participate in international efforts concerning vaccination and vaccine access. International regulatory cooperation also includes arrangements intended to harmonize pharmaceutical manufacturing and inspection standards. However, decisions about vaccine approval, vaccination requirements, and compensation for injuries are generally made under national or subnational legal systems. The vaccination laws of different countries also vary considerably, with some jurisdictions imposing extensive childhood vaccination requirements, and others relying more heavily on recommendations, incentives, or cultural and traditional support for vaccination. National approaches also differ with respect to the availability of medical and religious exemptions, the public financing of vaccination, adverse-event reporting, and compensation for vaccine injuries.

During the COVID-19 pandemic, the COVAX initiative established multinational arrangements for vaccine procurement and distribution, including an international mechanism for compensating certain asserted vaccine injuries. The COVAX No-Fault Compensation Program was established to provide lump-sum compensation for qualifying serious adverse events attributed to COVID-19 vaccines supplied through COVAX and administered in economies eligible for support under the Gavi COVAX Advance Market Commitment. The program provided an international alternative to seeking compensation through national legal systems, subject to its eligibility requirements. COVAX officially closed on December 31, 2023, after delivering nearly two billion doses of COVID-19 vaccines to 146 economies. Participating organizations estimated that the vaccines distributed through COVAX had averted approximately 2.7 million deaths in lower-income participating economies, contributing to the broader worldwide reduction in COVID-19 mortality attributable to vaccination. Following the closure of COVAX, eligible lower-income economies continued to have access to COVID-19 vaccines and delivery support through regular programs administered by Gavi.

== History and literature ==
Although laws governing vaccination have existed nearly since the advent of vaccines in the 18th century, the field of vaccine law was not well-recognized as a separate field until the 2000s. A 2007 article in The Journal of Law, Medicine & Ethics, titled "Vaccine Law 101", by Eric Hargan, Daniel O'Brien, Susan Sherman, and Georges Benjamin, examined the federal and state legal frameworks governing vaccine research, licensing, manufacturing, procurement, distribution, administration, and liability. Abramson and Ransom have described the field as comprising distinct areas of legal practice that can be organized around the successive stages of vaccine development and use. They identify regulation, intellectual property, public health policy, vaccine access and equity, vaccination mandates, injury compensation, and legal responses to misinformation as interconnected subjects within the field.

In 2018, the first comprehensive legal treatise in the field, Vaccine, Vaccination, and Immunization Law, was co-published by the Book Division of Bloomberg Law and the American Health Law Association, co-authored by Brian Dean Abramson with John R. Thomas and Peter O. Safir. The treatise was "the first to comprehensively cover all aspects of vaccine law".

A 2020 Congressional Research Service report examined legal issues in COVID-19 vaccine development and deployment, organizing its analysis around vaccine testing and regulatory approval, intellectual property and access, governmental vaccination requirements, and liability and injury compensation. A second edition of the treatise, Vaccine, Vaccination, and Immunization Law, was published in 2022, additionally co-authored by Dorit Rubinstein Reiss. The second edition contained updated content covering COVID-19 vaccines, as well as "pandemic response and other pandemic-related materials; employer/ employee vaccination mandates; international vaccine law; and legal responses to anti-vaccine activism". A third edition, with numerous additional authors, was published in 2025, and received a four-star rating from Doody's Reviews, also being placed on the Doody's Core Titles list in Health Policy for 2026, a designation given to works recommended by health-sciences specialists and librarians as core resources for professional and academic collections. In 2022, the first National Vaccine Law Conference was held at the Antonin Scalia Law School of George Mason University, in Northern Virginia, featuring panels and speakers addressing different areas of the field.

== See also ==
- Vaccination policy
