= Vaccine hesitancy =

Reluctance or refusal of vaccines

Share who disagrees that vaccines are important

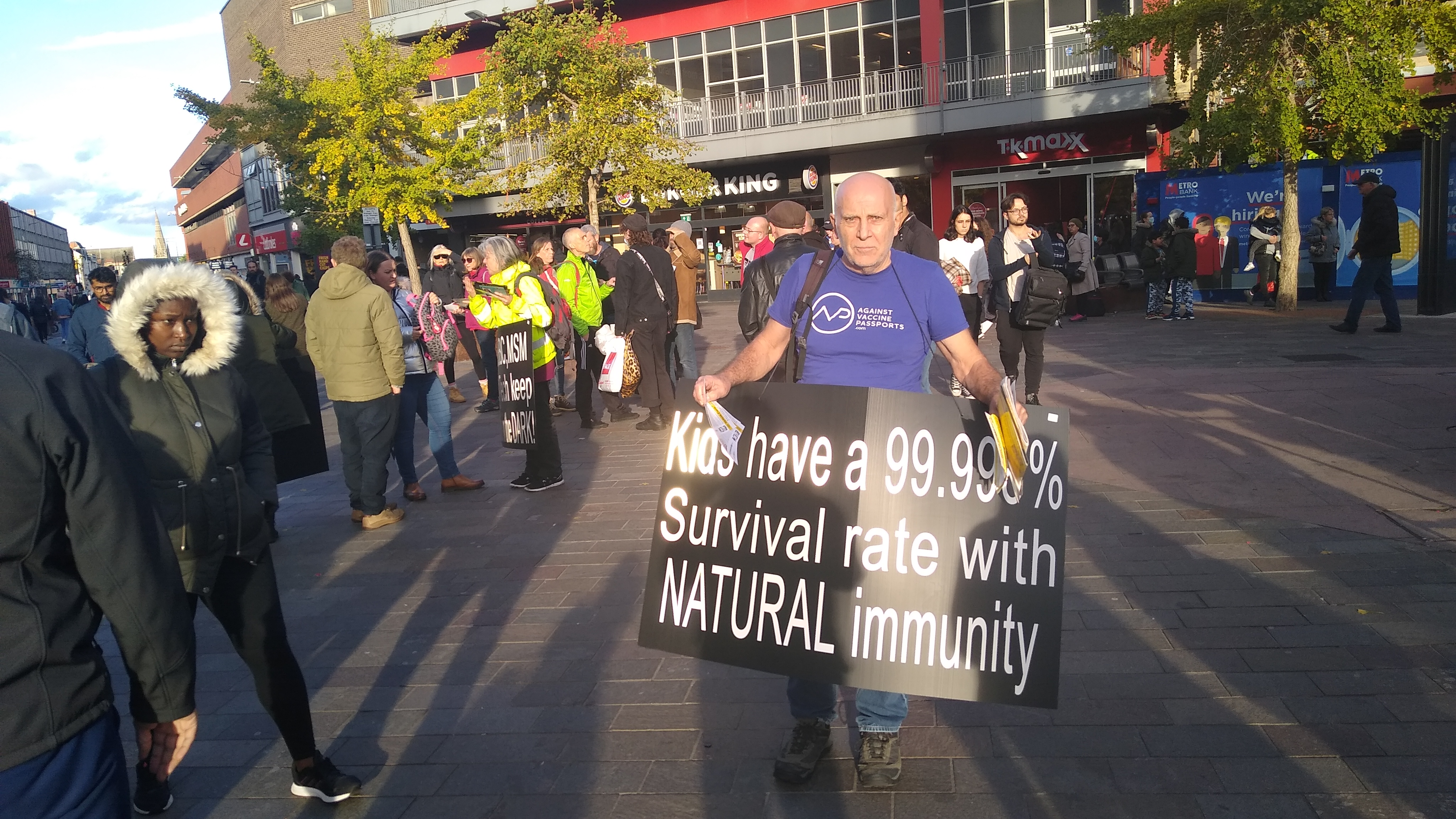
An anti-vaccination activist with a false claim that children can be effectively protected from disease solely by natural immunity

Vaccine hesitancy is a delay in acceptance or refusal of vaccines despite availability and supporting evidence of effectivity. The term also includes accepting vaccines but remaining uncertain about their use or using certain vaccines but not others. Although adverse effects associated with vaccines are occasionally observed, the scientific consensus that vaccines are generally safe and effective is overwhelming. Vaccine hesitancy often results in disease outbreaks and deaths from vaccine-preventable diseases. Therefore, the World Health Organization characterizes vaccine hesitancy as one of the top ten global health threats.

Vaccine hesitancy is complex and context-specific, varying across time, place, and specific vaccine. It can be influenced by factors such as lack of proper scientific-based knowledge and understanding about how vaccines are made or work. Other possible factors include a fear of needles, distrust of or lack of confidence in public authorities (including healthcare providers) and/or the vaccine, complacency (the person does not see a need for the vaccine or does not see the value in it), and convenience (access to vaccines). It has existed since the invention of vaccination and pre-dates the coining of the terms "vaccine" and "vaccination" by nearly eighty years.

Although myths, conspiracy theories, misinformation, and disinformation spread by the anti-vaccination movement and fringe doctors lead to vaccine hesitancy and public debates around the medical, ethical, and legal issues related to vaccines, there is no serious hesitancy or debate within mainstream medical and scientific circles about the benefits of vaccination.

Opposition to mandatory vaccination may be based on anti-vaccine sentiment, concern that it violates civil liberties, reduces public trust in vaccination, or suspicion of profiteering by the pharmaceutical industry.

== Safety concerns ==
As with any medical treatment, there is potential for vaccines to cause serious complications such as allergic reactions, but unlike other interventions, vaccines are given to healthy people and so require a higher safety standard. Serious complications are extremely rare and much less common than risks from diseases they prevent. As the success of immunization programs increases, public attention may shift away from the risks of disease to the risk of vaccination, undermining public support for vaccination programs.

The success of vaccinations has made certain diseases rare, and consequently led to incorrect heuristic thinking in weighing risks and benefits among the vaccine-hesitant. Once such diseases (e.g., Haemophilus influenzae B) decrease in prevalence, people may no longer appreciate how serious the illness is due to a lack of familiarity with it, and become complacent. The lack of personal experience with these diseases reduces the perceived danger and thus reduces the perceived benefit of immunization. Conversely, certain illnesses (e.g., influenza) remain so common that vaccine-hesitant people mistakenly perceive the illness to be non-threatening despite clear evidence that the illness poses a significant threat to human health. Omission and disconfirmation biases also contribute to vaccine hesitancy.

Concerns about immunization safety often follow a pattern. First, some investigators suggest that a medical condition of increasing prevalence or unknown cause is an adverse effect of vaccination. The initial study and subsequent studies by the same group have an inadequate methodology, typically a poorly controlled or uncontrolled case series. A premature announcement is made about the alleged adverse effect, resonating with individuals who have the condition, and underestimating the potential harm of forgoing vaccination to those whom the vaccine could protect. Other groups attempt to replicate the initial study but fail to get the same results. Finally, it takes several years to regain public confidence in the vaccine. Adverse effects ascribed to vaccines typically have an unknown origin, an increasing incidence, some biological plausibility, occurrences close to the time of vaccination, and dreaded outcomes. In almost all cases, the public health effect is limited by cultural boundaries: English speakers worry about one vaccine causing autism, while French speakers worry about another vaccine causing multiple sclerosis, and Nigerians worry that a third vaccine causes infertility.

=== Ingredients concerns ===
==== Thiomersal ====
Thiomersal (called "thimerosal" in the US) is an antifungal preservative used in small amounts in some multi-dose vaccines (where the same vial is used for multiple patients) to prevent contamination. Thiomersal is metabolized or degraded by the body into ethylmercury (C_{2}H_{5}Hg^{+}) and thiosalicylate. In 1999, the Centers for Disease Control (CDC) and the American Academy of Pediatrics (AAP) asked vaccine makers to remove thiomersal from vaccines on the precautionary principle. Thiomersal has been cleared from all common U.S. and European vaccines, except for some preparations of influenza vaccine. Trace amounts remain in some vaccines due to production processes, at an approximate maximum of one microgramme, around 15% of the average daily mercury intake in the U.S. for adults and 2.5% of the daily amount considered tolerable by the WHO. The action sparked concern that thiomersal could have been responsible for autism. This is considered disproven, as incidence rates for autism increased steadily even after thiomersal was removed. There is no accepted scientific evidence that exposure to thiomersal is a factor in causing autism. Since 2000, parents in the United States have pursued legal compensation from a federal fund arguing that thiomersal caused autism in their children. A 2004 Institute of Medicine (IOM) committee favored rejecting any causal relationship between thiomersal-containing vaccines and autism. The concentration of thiomersal used in vaccines as an antimicrobial agent ranges from 0.001% (1 part in 100,000) to 0.01% (1 part in 10,000). A vaccine containing 0.01% thiomersal has 25 micrograms of mercury per 0.5 mL dose, roughly the same amount of elemental mercury found in a three-ounce (85 g) can of tuna. There is robust peer-reviewed scientific evidence supporting the safety of thiomersal-containing vaccines.

==== Formaldehyde ====
Vaccine-hesitant people have also voiced concerns about the presence of formaldehyde in vaccines. Formaldehyde is used in small concentrations to inactivate viruses and bacterial toxins used in vaccines. Small amounts of residual formaldehyde can be present in vaccines but are far below values harmful to human health. The levels present in vaccines are minuscule when compared to naturally occurring levels of formaldehyde in the human body and pose no significant risk of toxicity. The human body continuously produces formaldehyde naturally and contains 50–70 times the greatest amount of formaldehyde present in any vaccine. Furthermore, the human body is capable of breaking down naturally occurring formaldehyde as well as the small amount of formaldehyde present in vaccines. There is no evidence linking the infrequent exposures to small quantities of formaldehyde present in vaccines with cancer.

=== MMR vaccine ===
In the UK, the MMR vaccine was the subject of controversy after the publication in The Lancet of a 1998 paper by Andrew Wakefield and others reporting case histories of twelve children mostly with autism spectrum disorders with onset soon after administration of the vaccine. At a 1998 press conference, Wakefield suggested that giving children the vaccines in three separate doses would be safer than a single vaccination. This was not supported by the paper, and several subsequent peer-reviewed studies failed to show any association between the vaccine and autism. It later emerged that Wakefield had received funding from litigants against vaccine manufacturers and that he had not informed colleagues or medical authorities of his conflict of interest: Wakefield reportedly stood to earn up to $43 million per year selling diagnostic kits. Had this been known, publication in The Lancet would not have taken place in the way that it did. Wakefield has been heavily criticized on scientific and ethical grounds for the way the research was conducted and for triggering a decline in vaccination rates, which fell in the UK to 80% in the years following the study. In 2004, the MMR-and-autism interpretation of the paper was formally retracted by ten of its thirteen coauthors, and in 2010 The Lancet's editors fully retracted the paper. Wakefield was struck off the UK medical register, with a statement identifying deliberate falsification in the research published in The Lancet, and is barred from practicing medicine in the UK.

The CDC, the IOM of the National Academy of Sciences, Australia's Department of Health, and the UK National Health Service have all concluded that there is no evidence of a link between the MMR vaccine and autism. A Cochrane review (2012, updated in 2020) concluded that there is no credible link between the MMR vaccine and autism, that MMR has prevented diseases that still carry a heavy burden of death and complications, that supports their use for mass immunization, that the lack of confidence in MMR has damaged public health, and that the design and reporting of safety outcomes in MMR vaccine studies are largely inadequate. Additional reviews agree, with studies finding that vaccines are not linked to autism even in high risk populations with autistic siblings.

In 2009, The Sunday Times reported that Wakefield had manipulated patient data and misreported results in his 1998 paper, creating the appearance of a link with autism. A 2011 article in the British Medical Journal described how the data in the study had been falsified by Wakefield so that it would arrive at a predetermined conclusion. An accompanying editorial in the same journal described Wakefield's work as an "elaborate fraud" that led to lower vaccination rates, putting hundreds of thousands of children at risk and diverting energy and money away from research into the true cause of autism.

A special court convened in the United States to review claims under the National Vaccine Injury Compensation Program ruled on February 12, 2009, that the evidence "failed to demonstrate that thimerosal-containing vaccines can contribute to causing immune dysfunction, or that the MMR vaccine can contribute to causing either autism or gastrointestinal dysfunction", and that parents of autistic children were therefore not entitled to compensation in their contention that certain vaccines caused autism in their children.

=== Vaccine overload ===
Vaccine overload, a non-medical term, is the notion that administering many vaccines at once may overwhelm a child's immune system. The concept of vaccine overload is biologically implausible, as vaccinated and unvaccinated children have the same immune response to non–vaccine-related infections, and autism is not an immune-mediated disease. Claims that vaccines could overload the immune system go against current knowledge of the pathogenesis of autism.

Despite the increase in the number of vaccines over recent decades, improvements in vaccine design have reduced the immunologic load from vaccines; the total number of immunological components in the 14 vaccines administered to US children in 2009 is less than 10 percent of vaccines given in 1980. A study published in 2013 found no correlation between autism and the antigen number in the vaccines administered up to the age of two. There were 1,008 children in the study, one quarter of whom were diagnosed with autism, and the cohort was born between 1994 and 1999, when the routine vaccine schedule could contain more than 3,000 antigens (in a single shot of DTP vaccine). The vaccine schedule in 2012 contained several more vaccines, but the number of antigens was 315. Vaccines pose small immunologic load compared to the pathogens naturally encountered by children. Common childhood conditions such as fevers and middle-ear infections pose a much greater challenge to the immune system than vaccines, and studies have shown that vaccinations, even multiple concurrent vaccinations, do not weaken the immune system or compromise overall immunity. The lack of evidence supporting the vaccine overload hypothesis, combined with these findings directly contradicting it, has led to the conclusion that currently recommended vaccine programs do not "overload" or weaken the immune system.

=== Prenatal infection ===
Based on studies in animal models, theoretical concerns have been raised about a possible link between schizophrenia and maternal immune response activated by virus antigens. A 2009 review concluded that there was insufficient evidence to recommend routine use of trivalent influenza vaccine during the first trimester of pregnancy, but that the vaccine was still recommended outside the first trimester and in special circumstances such as pandemics or in women with certain other conditions. The CDC's Advisory Committee on Immunization Practices, the American College of Obstetricians and Gynecologists, and the American Academy of Family Physicians all recommend routine flu shots for pregnant women based on the risk for serious influenza-related complications, greater rates for flu-related hospitalizations compared to non-pregnant women, the possible transfer of maternal anti-influenza antibodies, and several studies failing to find harm to pregnant women or their children from the vaccinations. Despite this recommendation, only 16% of healthy pregnant US women surveyed in 2005 had been vaccinated against the flu.

=== Sudden infant death syndrome ===
Sudden infant death syndrome (SIDS) is most common in infants around the time in life when they receive many vaccinations. Since the cause of SIDS has not been fully determined, this led to concerns about whether vaccines, in particular diphtheria-tetanus toxoid vaccines, were a possible causal factor. Several studies investigated this and found no evidence supporting a causal link between vaccination and SIDS. In 2003, the Institute of Medicine favored rejection of a causal link to DTwP vaccination and SIDS after reviewing the available evidence. Additional analyses of VAERS data also showed no relationship between vaccination and SIDS. Studies have shown a negative correlation between SIDs and vaccination. That is vaccinated children are less likely to die but no causal link has been found. One suggestion is that infants who are less likely to develop SIDS are more likely to be presented for vaccination.

=== Anthrax vaccines ===
In the mid-1990s media reports on vaccines discussed the Gulf War Syndrome, a multi-symptomatic disorder affecting returning US military veterans of the 1990–1991 Persian Gulf War. Among the first articles of the online magazine Slate was one by Atul Gawande in which the required immunizations received by soldiers, including an anthrax vaccination, were named as one of the likely culprits for the symptoms associated with the Gulf War Syndrome. In the late 1990s Slate published an article on the "brewing rebellion" in the military against anthrax immunization because of "the availability to soldiers of vaccine misinformation on the Internet". Slate continued to report on concerns about the required anthrax and smallpox immunization for US troops after the September 11 attacks and articles on the subject also appeared on the Salon website. The 2001 anthrax attacks heightened concerns about bioterrorism and the Federal government of the United States stepped up its efforts to store and create more vaccines for American citizens. In 2002, Mother Jones published an article that was highly skeptical of the anthrax and smallpox immunization required by the United States Armed Forces. With the 2003 invasion of Iraq a wider controversy ensued in the media about requiring US troops to be vaccinated against anthrax. From 2003 to 2008 a series of court cases were brought to oppose the compulsory anthrax vaccination of US troops.

=== Swine flu vaccine ===
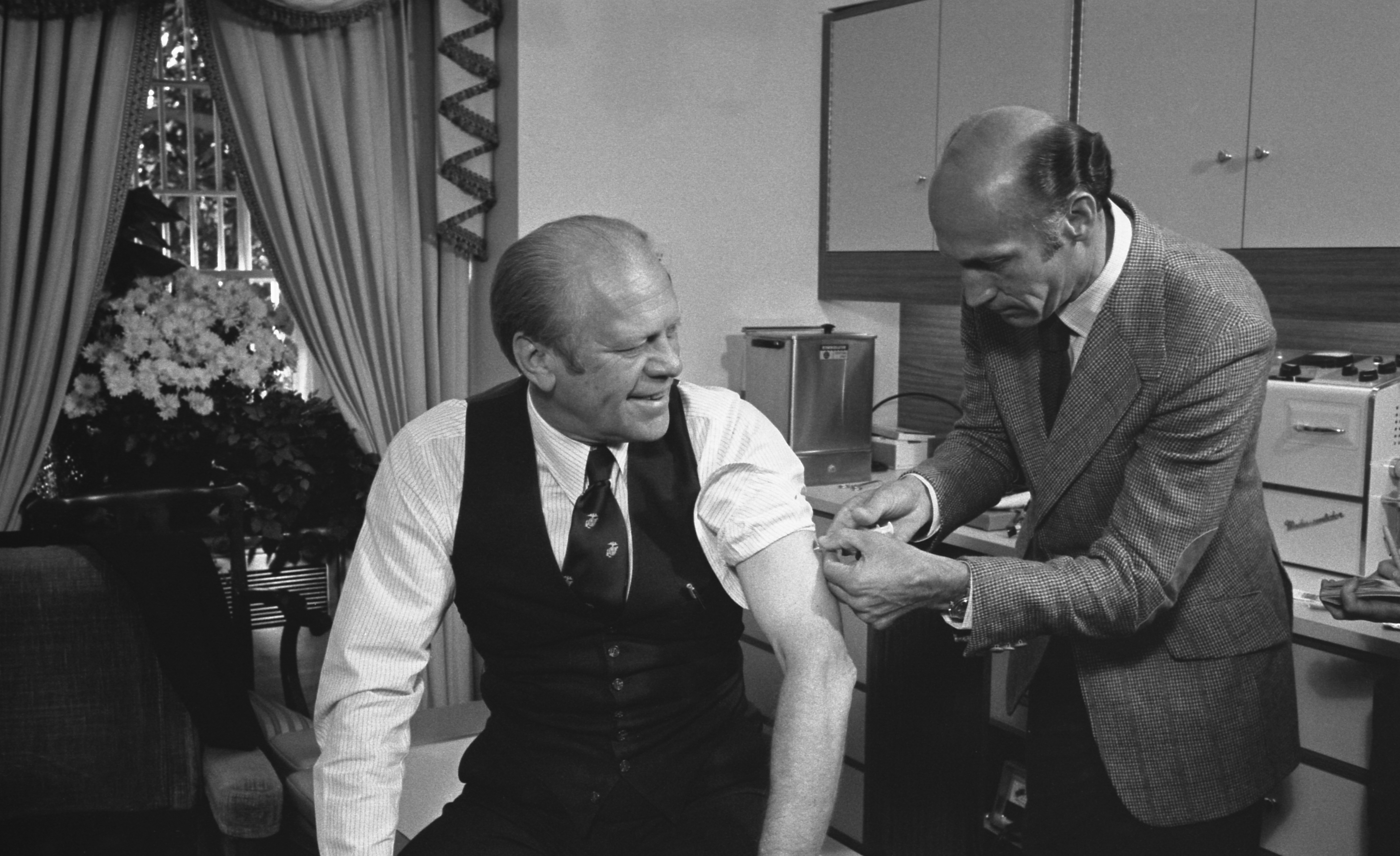
U.S. President Gerald Ford receiving his vaccine for the swine flu

The U.S. swine flu immunization campaign in response to the 1976 swine flu outbreak has become known as "the swine flu fiasco" because the outbreak did not lead to a pandemic as U.S. President Gerald Ford had feared, and the hastily rolled out vaccine was found to increase the number of Guillain–Barré Syndrome cases two weeks after immunization. Government officials stopped the mass immunization campaign due to great anxiety about the safety of the swine flu vaccine. The general public was left with greater fear of the vaccination campaign than the virus itself, and vaccination policies, in general, were challenged.

During the 2009 flu pandemic, significant controversy broke out regarding whether the 2009 H1N1 flu vaccine was safe in, among other countries, France. Numerous different French groups publicly criticized the vaccine as potentially dangerous. Because of similarities between the 2009 influenza A subtype H1N1 virus and the 1976 influenza A/NJ virus many countries established surveillance systems for vaccine-related adverse effects on human health. A possible link between the 2009 H1N1 flu vaccine and Guillain–Barré Syndrome cases was studied in Europe and the United States.

=== Blood transfusion ===
After the introduction of COVID-19 vaccines, vaccine hesitant people have at times demanded that they get donor blood from donors that have not received the vaccine. In the US and Canada, blood centers do not keep data on whether a donor has been COVID-19 infected or vaccinated, and in August 2021 it was estimated that 60-70% of US blood donors had COVID-19 antibodies. Research director Timothy Caulfield said that "This really highlights, I think, how powerful misinformation can be. It can really have an impact in a way that can be dangerous ... There is no evidence to support these concerns." The British Journal of Haematology called the trend "alarming" in 2021. The chief medical officer of ImpactLife said the same year that accepting such a demand "would be an operational can of worms for a medically unjustifiable request".

As of August 2021, such demands were rare in the US. As of 2024, the numbers are increasing. Doctors in Alberta, Canada, warned in November 2022 that the demands were becoming more common. The Association for the Advancement of Blood & Biotherapies (AABB) and the Canadian Blood Services have both issued guidance on how to respond to such demands.

In Italy and New Zealand, parents have gone to court to stop their children's urgent heart surgery, unless COVID-19 vaccine free blood was provided. In both cases the parents were ruled against, though they stated that they could provide willing donors they found acceptable. The New Zealand Blood Service does not label blood according to the donor's COVID-19 vaccine history, and as of 2022, about 90% of New Zealand's population over twelve years of age has had two COVID-19 vaccinations. In another Italian case, a blood transfusion for a sick 90-year-old man was refused by his two daughters, due to vaccine hesitancy concerns. Another New Zealand couple stated that they were trying to arrange their child to have her next heart surgery in India, to avoid her being given blood from COVID-19 vaccinated donors.

=== Other safety concerns ===
Other safety concerns about vaccines have been promoted on the Internet, in informal meetings, in books, and at symposia. These include hypotheses that vaccination can cause epileptic seizures, allergies, multiple sclerosis, and autoimmune diseases such as type 1 diabetes, as well as hypotheses that vaccinations can transmit bovine spongiform encephalopathy, hepatitis C virus, and HIV. These hypotheses have been investigated, with the conclusion that currently used vaccines meet high safety standards and that criticism of vaccine safety in the popular press is not justified. Large well-controlled epidemiologic studies have been conducted and the results do not support the hypothesis that vaccines cause chronic diseases. Furthermore, some vaccines are probably more likely to prevent or modify than cause or exacerbate autoimmune diseases.

Another common concern parents often have is about the pain associated with administering vaccines during a doctor's office visit. This may lead to parental requests to space out vaccinations; however, studies have shown a child's stress response is not different when receiving one vaccination or two. The act of spacing out vaccinations may actually lead to more stressful stimuli for the child.

== Vaccine myths and misinformation ==
Several vaccination myths contribute to parental concerns and vaccine hesitancy. These include the alleged superiority of natural infection when compared to vaccination, questioning whether the diseases vaccines prevent are dangerous, whether vaccines pose moral or religious dilemmas, suggesting that vaccines are not effective, proposing unproven or ineffective approaches as alternatives to vaccines, and conspiracy theories that center on mistrust of the government and medical institutions.

Nevertheless, despite a major measles outbreak in the United States Southwest which began February 2025 in an area of Texas with low measles immunization rates—perhaps due in part to vaccine misinformation—in March 2025, the U.S. National Institutes of Health and the Centers for Disease Control and Prevention, under the direction of Secretary of Health and Human Services Robert F. Kennedy Jr., abruptly cancelled funding for over 40 research grants studying vaccine hesitancy.

=== Autism ===
The idea of a link between vaccines and autism has been extensively investigated and conclusively shown to be false. The scientific consensus is that there is no relationship, causal or otherwise, between vaccines and incidence of autism, and vaccine ingredients do not cause autism.

Nevertheless, the anti-vaccination movement continues to promote myths, conspiracy theories, and misinformation linking the two. A developing tactic described by Skeptical Inquirer appears to be the "promotion of irrelevant research [as] an active aggregation of several questionable or peripherally related research studies in an attempt to justify the science underlying a questionable claim".

=== Vaccination during illness ===
Many parents are concerned about the safety of vaccination when their child is sick. Moderate to severe acute illness with or without a fever is indeed a precaution when considering vaccination. Vaccines remain effective during childhood illness. The reason vaccines may be withheld if a child is moderately to severely ill is because certain expected side effects of vaccination (e.g. fever or rash) may be confused with the progression of the illness. It is safe to administer vaccines to well-appearing children who are mildly ill with the common cold.

=== Natural infection ===
Another common anti-vaccine myth is that the immune system produces a better immune protection in response to natural infection when compared to vaccination. However, strength and duration of immune protection gained varies by both disease and vaccine, with some vaccines giving better protection than natural infection. For example, the HPV vaccine generates better immune protection than natural infection due to the vaccine containing higher concentrations of a viral coat protein, while also not containing proteins the HPV viruses use to inhibit immune response.

While it is true that infection with certain illnesses may produce lifelong immunity, many natural infections do not produce lifelong immunity, while carrying a higher risk of harming a person's health than vaccines. For example, natural varicella infection carries a higher risk of bacterial superinfection with Group A streptococci.

Natural measles infection carries a high risk of many serious, and sometimes life-long, complications, all of which can be avoided by vaccination. Those infected with measles rarely have a symptomatic reinfection.

Most people survive measles, though in some cases, complications may occur. Among those that experience complications, about 1 in 4 individuals will be hospitalized and 1–2 in 1000 will die. Complications are more likely in children under age 5 and adults over age 20. Pneumonia is the most common fatal complication of measles infection and accounts for 56–86% of measles-related deaths.

Possible consequences of measles virus infection include laryngotracheobronchitis, sensorineural hearing loss, and—in about 1 in 10,000 to 1 in 300,000 cases—panencephalitis, which is usually fatal. Acute measles encephalitis is another serious risk of measles virus infection. It typically occurs two days to one week after the measles rash breaks out and begins with very high fever, severe headache, convulsions and altered mentation. A person with measles encephalitis may become comatose, and death or brain injury may occur.

The measles virus can deplete previously acquired immune memory by killing cells that make antibodies, and thus weakens the immune system which can cause deaths from other diseases. Suppression of the immune system by measles lasts about two years and has been epidemiologically implicated in up to 90% of childhood deaths in third world countries, and historically may have caused rather more deaths in the United States, the UK and Denmark than were directly caused by measles. Although the measles vaccine contains an attenuated strain, it does not deplete immune memory.

=== HPV vaccine ===
The idea that the HPV vaccine is linked to increased sexual behavior is not supported by scientific evidence. A review of nearly 1,400 adolescent girls found no difference in teen pregnancy, the incidence of sexually transmitted infection, or contraceptive counseling regardless of whether they received the HPV vaccine. Thousands of Americans die each year from cancers preventable by the vaccine.

There remains a disproportionate rate of HPV-related cancers amongst LatinX populations, leading researchers to explore how messaging may be made more effective to address vaccine hesitancy.

=== Vaccine schedule ===
Other concerns have been raised about the vaccine schedule recommended by the Advisory Committee on Immunization Practices (ACIP). The immunization schedule is designed to protect children against preventable diseases when they are most vulnerable. The practice of delaying or spacing out these vaccinations increases the amount of time the child is susceptible to these illnesses. Receiving vaccines on the schedule recommended by the ACIP is not linked to autism or developmental delay.

=== Information warfare ===
An analysis of tweets from July 2014 through September 2017 revealed an active campaign on Twitter by the Internet Research Agency (IRA), a Russian troll farm accused of interference in the 2016 U.S. elections, to sow discord about the safety of vaccines. The campaign used sophisticated Twitter bots to amplify polarizing pro-vaccine and anti-vaccine messages, containing the hashtag #VaccinateUS, posted by IRA trolls.

Throughout 2020 and 2021, the United States ran a propaganda campaign to spread disinformation about the Sinovac Chinese COVID-19 vaccine, including using fake social media accounts to spread the disinformation that the Sinovac vaccine contained pork-derived ingredients and was therefore haram under Islamic law. The campaign primarily targeted people in the Philippines and used a social media hashtag for "China is the virus" in Tagalog.

=== Sanitation ===
There is anti-vaccine literature that argues that reductions in infectious disease result from improved sanitation and hygiene (rather than vaccination) or that these diseases were already in decline before the introduction of specific vaccines. These claims are not supported by scientific data; the incidence of vaccine-preventable diseases tended to fluctuate over time until the introduction of specific vaccines, at which point the incidence dropped to near zero. A Centers for Disease Control and Prevention website aimed at countering common misconceptions about vaccines argued, "Are we expected to believe that better sanitation caused the incidence of each disease to drop, just at the time a vaccine for that disease was introduced?"

== Alternative medicine ==
Many forms of alternative medicine are based on philosophies that oppose vaccination (including germ theory denialism) and have practitioners who voice their opposition. As a consequence, the increase in popularity of alternative medicine in the 1970s planted the seeds of the modern anti-vaccination movement. More specifically, some elements of the chiropractic community, some homeopaths, and naturopaths developed anti-vaccine rhetoric. The reasons for this negative vaccination view are complicated and rest at least in part on the early philosophies that shaped the foundation of these groups.

=== Chiropractic ===
Historically, chiropractic strongly opposed vaccination based on its belief that all diseases were traceable to so-called "vertebral subluxations" in the spine and therefore could not be affected by vaccines. Daniel D. Palmer (1845–1913), the founder of chiropractic, wrote: "It is the very height of absurdity to strive to 'protect' any person from smallpox or any other malady by inoculating them with a filthy animal poison." Vaccination remains controversial within the profession. Most chiropractic writings on vaccination focus on its negative aspects. A 1995 survey of US chiropractors found that about one third believed there was no scientific proof that immunization prevents disease. While the Canadian Chiropractic Association supports vaccination, a survey in Alberta in 2002 found that 25% of chiropractors advised patients for, and 27% advised against, vaccinations for patients or for their children.

Although most chiropractic colleges try to teach about vaccination in a manner consistent with scientific evidence, several have faculty who seem to stress negative views. A survey of a 1999–2000 cross-section of students of Canadian Memorial Chiropractic College (CMCC), which does not formally teach anti-vaccination views, reported that fourth-year students opposed vaccination more strongly than did first-year students, with 29.4% of fourth-year students opposing vaccination. A follow-up study on 2011–12 CMCC students found that pro-vaccination attitudes heavily predominated. Students reported support rates ranging from 84% to 90%. One of the study's authors proposed the change in attitude to be due to the lack of the previous influence of a "subgroup of some charismatic students who were enrolled at CMCC at the time, students who championed the Palmer postulates that advocated against the use of vaccination".

==== Policy positions ====
The American Chiropractic Association and the International Chiropractic Association support individual exemptions to compulsory vaccination laws. In March 2015, the Oregon Chiropractic Association invited Andrew Wakefield, chief author of a fraudulent research paper, to testify against Senate Bill 442, "a bill that would eliminate nonmedical exemptions from Oregon's school immunization law". The California Chiropractic Association lobbied against a 2015 bill ending belief exemptions for vaccines. They had also opposed a 2012 bill related to vaccination exemptions.

=== Homeopathy ===
Several surveys have shown that some practitioners of homeopathy, particularly homeopaths without any medical training, advise patients against vaccination. For example, a survey of registered homeopaths in Austria found that only 28% considered immunization an important preventive measure, and 83% of homeopaths surveyed in Sydney, Australia, did not recommend vaccination. Many practitioners of naturopathy also oppose vaccination.

Homeopathic "vaccines" (nosodes) are ineffective because they do not contain any active ingredients and thus do not stimulate the immune system. They can be dangerous if they take the place of effective treatments. Some medical organizations have taken action against nosodes. In Canada, the labeling of homeopathic nosodes require the statement: "This product is neither a vaccine nor an alternative to vaccination."

=== Financial motives ===
Alternative medicine proponents gain from promoting vaccine conspiracy theories through the sale of ineffective and expensive medications, supplements, and procedures such as chelation therapy and hyperbaric oxygen therapy, sold as able to cure the 'damage' caused by vaccines. Homeopaths in particular gain through the promotion of water injections or 'nosodes' that they allege have a 'natural' vaccine-like effect. Additional bodies with a vested interest in promoting the "unsafeness" of vaccines may include lawyers and legal groups organizing court cases and class action lawsuits against vaccine providers.

Conversely, alternative medicine providers have accused the vaccine industry of misrepresenting the safety and effectiveness of vaccines, covering up and suppressing information, and influencing health policy decisions for financial gain. In the late 20th century, vaccines were a product with low profit margins, and the number of companies involved in vaccine manufacture declined. In addition to low profits and liability risks, manufacturers complained about low prices paid for vaccines by the CDC and other US government agencies. In the early 21st century, the vaccine market greatly improved with the approval of the vaccine Prevnar, along with a small number of other high-priced blockbuster vaccines, such as Gardasil and Pediarix, which each had sales revenues of over $1 billion in 2008. Despite high growth rates, vaccines represent a relatively small portion of overall pharmaceutical profits. As recently as 2010, the World Health Organization estimated vaccines to represent 2–3% of total sales for the pharmaceutical industry.

== Psychological factors ==
The rise in vaccine hesitancy has led to research on the psychology of those who actively oppose vaccines. The largest psychological factors leading to anti-vaccination attitudes are conspiratorial thinking, reactance, disgust regarding blood or needles, and individualistic or hierarchical worldviews. In contrast, demographic variables are not significant.

Researchers have also investigated the psychological roots of vaccine hesitancy with regard to specific vaccines. For instance, a 2021 study published in Nature Communications investigated psychological characteristics associated with COVID-19 vaccine hesitancy and resistance in Ireland and the UK. The study found that vaccine hesitant or resistant respondents in the two countries varied across socio-demographic and health-related variables, however, they were similar in range of psychological factors. Such respondents were less likely to obtain information about the pandemic from authoritative and traditional media sources and demonstrated similar skepticism towards these sources compared to respondents who accepted the vaccine.

=== Fear of needles ===
Blood-injection-injury phobia and general fear of needles and injections can lead people to avoid vaccinations. One survey conducted in January and February 2021 estimated this was responsible for 10% of the COVID-19 vaccine hesitancy in the UK at the time. A 2012 survey of American parents found that a fear of needles was the most common reason for adolescents to forgo their second dose of a HPV vaccine.

Various treatments for fear of needles can help overcome this problem, from offering pain reduction at the time of injection to long-term behavioral therapy. Tensing the stomach muscles can help avoid fainting, swearing can reduce perceived pain, and distraction can also improve the perceived experience, such as by pretending to cough, performing a visual task, watching a video, or playing a video game. To avoid dissuading people who have a needle phobia, vaccine update researchers recommend against using pictures of needles, people getting an injection, or faces displaying negative emotions (like a crying baby) in promotional materials. Instead, they recommend medically accurate photos depicting smiling, diverse people with bandages, vaccination cards, or a rolled-up sleeve; depicting vials instead of needles; and depicting the people who develop and test vaccines. Development of vaccines that can be administered orally or with a jet injector can also avoid triggering the fear of needles.

== Social and political ==
Beyond misinformation, social and economic conditions also influence how many people take vaccines. Factors such as income, socioeconomic status, ethnicity, age, and education can determine the uptake of vaccines and their impact, especially among vulnerable communities.

Social factors like whether one lives with others may affect vaccine uptake. For example, older individuals who live alone are much more likely not to take up vaccines compared to those living with other people. Other factors may be racial, with minority groups being affected by low vaccine uptake.

People with weaker immune systems or chronic illness are more likely to take up a vaccine if recommended by their physicians.

Politicization of medicine was found associated with vaccine hesitancy.

== Malpractice and fraud ==
=== Unethical human experimentation and medical racism ===
Some people in groups experiencing medical racism are less willing to trust doctors and modern medicine due to real historical incidents of unethical human experimentation and involuntary sterilization. Famous examples include drug trials in Africa without informed consent, the Guatemala syphilis experiments, the Tuskegee Syphilis Study, the culturing of cells from Henrietta Lacks without consent, and Nazi human experimentation.

To overcome this type of distrust, experts recommend including representative samples of majority and minority populations in drug trials, including minority groups in study design, being diligent about informed consent, and being transparent about the process of drug design and testing.

=== CIA fake vaccination clinic ===
In Pakistan, the CIA ran a fake vaccination clinic in an attempt to locate Osama bin Laden. As a direct consequence, there have been several attacks and deaths among vaccination workers. Several Islamist preachers and militant groups, including some factions of the Taliban, view vaccination as a plot to kill or sterilize Muslims. Efforts to eradicate polio have furthermore been disrupted by American drone strikes. Pakistan is among the only countries where polio remained endemic as of 2015.

=== Fake COVID-19 vaccines ===
In July 2021, Indian police arrested 14 people for administering doses of saline solution instead of the AstraZeneca vaccine at nearly a dozen private vaccination sites in Mumbai. The organizers, including medical professionals, charged between $10 and $17 for each dose, and more than 2,600 people paid to receive what they thought was the vaccine. The federal government downplayed the scandal, claiming these cases were isolated. McAfee stated India was among the top countries to have been targeted by fake apps to lure people with a promise of vaccines.

In Bhopal, slum residents were misled into thinking they would get an approved COVID-19 vaccine, but instead were actually part of an experimental clinical trial for the domestic vaccine Covaxin. Only 50% of participants in the trials received a vaccine with the rest receiving a placebo. One participant stated, "...I didn't know that there was a possibility you could get a water shot."

== Religion ==
Since most religions predate the invention of vaccines, scriptures do not specifically address the topic of vaccination. However, vaccination has been opposed by some on religious grounds ever since it was first introduced. When vaccination was first becoming widespread, some Christian opponents argued that preventing smallpox deaths would be thwarting God's will and that such prevention is sinful. Opposition from some religious groups continues to the present day, on various grounds, raising ethical difficulties when the number of unvaccinated children threatens harm to the entire population. Many governments allow parents to opt out of their children's otherwise mandatory vaccinations for religious reasons; some parents falsely claim religious beliefs to get vaccination exemptions.

Many Jewish community leaders support vaccination. Among early Hasidic leaders, Rabbi Nachman of Breslov (1772–1810) was known for his criticism of the doctors and medical treatments of his day. However, when the first vaccines were successfully introduced, he stated: "Every parent should have his children vaccinated within the first three months of life. Failure to do so is tantamount to murder. Even if they live far from the city and have to travel during the great winter cold, they should have the child vaccinated before three months."

Although gelatin can be derived from many animals, Jewish and Islamic scholars have determined that since the gelatin is cooked and not consumed as food, vaccinations containing gelatin are acceptable. However, in 2015 and again in 2020, the possible use of porcine-based gelatin in vaccines raised religious concerns among Muslims and Jews about the halal or kosher status of several vaccinations against COVID-19. The Muslim Council of Britain raised concern about the UK's intranasal influenza vaccine deployment in 2019 due to the presence of gelatin in the vaccine. The MCB subsequently clarified that it never advised against the vaccine, it did not have any religious authority to issue a fatwa on the matter, and that vaccines containing porcine gelatin are generally not considered haram if alternatives are unavailable (the injectable flu vaccine was also offered in Scotland, but not England).

In India, in 2018, a three-minute doctored clip circulated among Muslims claiming that the MR-VAC vaccine against measles and rubella was a "Modi government-RSS conspiracy" to stop the population growth of Muslims. The clip was taken from a TV show that exposed the baseless rumors. Hundreds of madrassas in the state of Uttar Pradesh refused permission to health department teams to administer vaccines because of rumors spread using WhatsApp.

Some Christians have objected to the use of cell cultures of some viral vaccines, and the virus of the rubella vaccine, on the grounds that they are derived from tissues taken from therapeutic abortions performed in the 1960s. The principle of double effect, originated by Thomas Aquinas, holds that actions with both good and bad consequences are morally acceptable in specific circumstances. The Vatican Curia has said that for vaccines originating from embryonic cells, Catholics have "a grave responsibility to use alternative vaccines and to make a conscientious objection", but concluded that it is acceptable for Catholics to use the existing vaccines until an alternative becomes available.

In the United States, some parents falsely claim religious exemptions when their real motivation for avoiding vaccines is supposed safety concerns. For a number of years, only Mississippi, West Virginia, and California did not provide religious exemptions. Following the 2019 measles outbreaks, Maine and New York repealed their religious exemptions, and the state of Washington did so for the measles vaccination.

According to a March 2021 poll conducted by The Associated Press/NORC, vaccine skepticism is more widespread among white evangelicals than most other blocs of Americans. Forty percent of white evangelical Protestants said they were not likely to get vaccinated against COVID-19. That compares with 25% of all Americans, 28% of white mainline Protestants and 27% of nonwhite Protestants.

== Geographical distribution ==
Vaccine hesitancy is becoming an increasing concern, particularly in industrialized nations. For example, one study surveying parents in Europe found that 12–28% of surveyed parents expressed doubts about vaccinating their children. Several studies have assessed socioeconomic and cultural factors associated with vaccine hesitancy. Both high and low socioeconomic status as well as high and low education levels have all been associated with vaccine hesitancy in different populations. Other studies examining various populations around the world in different countries found that both high and low socioeconomic status are associated with vaccine hesitancy.

=== Australia ===
An Australian study that examined the factors associated with vaccine attitudes and uptake separately found that under-vaccination correlated with lower socioeconomic status but not with negative attitudes towards vaccines. The researchers suggested that practical barriers are more likely to explain under-vaccination among individuals with lower socioeconomic status. A 2012 Australian study found that 52% of parents had concerns about the safety of vaccines.

During the COVID-19 pandemic, COVID-19 vaccine hesitancy reportedly was spreading in remote Indigenous communities, where people are typically poorer and less educated.

=== Europe ===
Confidence in vaccines varies over place and time and among different vaccines. The Vaccine Confidence Project in 2016 found that confidence was lower in Europe than in the rest of the world. Refusal of the MMR vaccine has increased in twelve European states since 2010. The project published a report in 2018 assessing vaccine hesitancy among the public in all the 28 EU member states and among general practitioners in ten of them. Younger adults in the survey had less confidence than older people. Confidence had risen in France, Greece, Italy, and Slovenia since 2015 but had fallen in the Czech Republic, Finland, Poland, and Sweden. 36% of the GPs surveyed in the Czech Republic and 25% of those in Slovakia did not agree that the MMR vaccine was safe. Most of the GPs did not recommend the seasonal influenza vaccine. Confidence in the population correlated with confidence among GPs.

== Countermeasures ==
Vaccine hesitancy is challenging and optimal strategies for approaching it remain uncertain.

Multicomponent initiatives which include targeting undervaccinated populations, improving the convenience of and access to vaccines, educational initiatives, and mandates may improve vaccination uptake.

The World Health Organization (WHO) published a paper in 2016 intending to aid experts on how to respond to vaccine deniers in public. The WHO recommends for experts to view the general public as their target audience rather than the vaccine denier when debating in a public forum. The WHO also suggests for experts to make unmasking the techniques that the vaccine denier uses to spread misinformation as the goal of the conversation. The WHO asserts that this will make the public audience more resilient against anti-vaccine tactics.

=== Providing information ===
Many interventions designed to address vaccine hesitancy have been based on the information deficit model. This model assumes that vaccine hesitancy is due to a person lacking the necessary information and attempts to provide them with that information to solve the problem. Despite many educational interventions attempting this approach, ample evidence indicates providing more information is often ineffective in changing a vaccine-hesitant person's views and may, in fact, have the opposite of the intended effect and reinforce their misconceptions.

It is unclear whether interventions intended to educate parents about vaccines improve the rate of vaccination. It is also unclear whether citing the reasons of benefit to others and herd immunity improves parents' willingness to vaccinate their children. In one trial, an educational intervention designed to dispel common misconceptions about the influenza vaccine decreased parents' false beliefs about the vaccines but did not improve uptake of the influenza vaccine. In fact, parents with significant concerns about adverse effects from the vaccine were less likely to vaccinate their children with the influenza vaccine after receiving this education.

=== Communication strategies ===
Several communication strategies are recommended for use when interacting with vaccine-hesitant parents. These include establishing honest and respectful dialogue; acknowledging the risks of a vaccine but balancing them against the risk of disease; referring parents to reputable sources of vaccine information; and maintaining ongoing conversations with vaccine-hesitant families. The American Academy of Pediatrics recommends healthcare providers directly address parental concerns about vaccines when questioned about their efficacy and safety. Additional recommendations include asking permission to share information; maintaining a conversational tone (as opposed to lecturing); not spending excessive amounts of time debunking specific myths (this may have the opposite effect of strengthening the myth in the person's mind); focusing on the facts and simply identifying the myth as false; and keeping information as simple as possible (if the myth seems simpler than the truth, it may be easier for people to accept the simple myth). Storytelling and anecdote (e.g., about the decision to vaccinate one's own children) can be powerful communication tools for conversations about the value of vaccination. A New Zealand-based General Practitioner has used a comic, Jenny & the Eddies, both to educate children about vaccines and address his patients' concerns through open, trusting, and non-threatening conversations, concluding [that] "I always listen to what people have to say on any matter. That includes vaccine hesitancy. That's a very important opening stage to improving the therapeutic relationship. If I'm going to change anyone's attitude, first I need to listen to them and be open-minded." The perceived strength of the recommendation, when provided by a healthcare provider, also seems to influence uptake, with recommendations that are perceived to be stronger resulting in higher vaccination rates than perceived weaker recommendations.

=== Provider presumption and persistence ===
Limited evidence suggests that a more paternalistic or presumptive approach ("Your son needs three shots today.") is more likely to result in patient acceptance of vaccines during a clinic visit than a participatory approach ("What do you want to do about shots?") but decreases patient satisfaction with the visit. A presumptive approach helps to establish that this is the normative choice. Similarly, one study found that the way in which physicians respond to parental vaccine resistance is important. Nearly half of initially vaccine-resistant parents accepted vaccinations if physicians persisted in their initial recommendation. The Centers for Disease Control and Prevention has released resources to aid healthcare providers in having more effective conversations with parents about vaccinations.

=== Pain mitigation for children ===
Parents may be hesitant to have their children vaccinated due to concerns about the pain of vaccination. Several strategies can be used to reduce the child's pain. Such strategies include distraction techniques (pinwheels); deep breathing techniques; breastfeeding the child; giving the child sweet-tasting solutions; quickly administering the vaccine without aspirating; keeping the child upright; providing tactile stimulation; applying numbing agents to the skin; and saving the most painful vaccine for last. As above, the number of vaccines offered in a particular encounter is related to the likelihood of parental vaccine refusal (the more vaccines offered, the higher the likelihood of vaccine deferral). The use of combination vaccines to protect against more diseases but with fewer injections may provide reassurance to parents. Similarly, reframing the conversation with less emphasis on the number of diseases the healthcare provider is immunizing against (e.g., "we will do two injections (combined vaccinations) and an oral vaccine") may be more acceptable to parents than "we're going to vaccinate against seven diseases".

=== Cultural sensitivity ===
Cultural sensitivity is important to reducing vaccine hesitancy. For example, pollster Frank Luntz discovered that for conservative Americans, family is by far the "most powerful motivator" to get a vaccine (over country, economy, community, or friends). Luntz "also found a very pronounced preference for the word 'vaccine' over 'jab.'"

=== Avoiding online misinformation ===
It is recommended that healthcare providers advise parents against performing their own web search queries since many websites on the Internet contain significant misinformation. Many parents perform their own research online and are often confused, frustrated, and unsure of which sources of information are trustworthy. Additional recommendations include introducing parents to the importance of vaccination as far in advance of the initial well-child visit as possible; presenting parents with vaccine safety information while in their pediatrician's waiting room; and using prenatal open houses and postpartum maternity ward visits as opportunities to vaccinate.

Internet advertising, especially on social networking websites, is purchased by both public health authorities and anti-vaccination groups. In the United States, the majority of anti-vaccine Facebook advertising in December 2018 and February 2019 had been paid for one of two groups: Children's Health Defense and Stop Mandatory Vaccination. The ads targeted women and young couples and generally highlighted the alleged risks of vaccines, while asking for donations. Several anti-vaccination advertising campaigns also targeted areas where measles outbreaks were underway during this period. The impact of Facebook's subsequent advertising policy changes has not been studied.

=== Incentive programs ===
Several countries have implemented programs to counter vaccine hesitancy, including raffles, lotteries, rewards and mandates. In the US State of Washington, authorities have given the green light to licensed cannabis dispensaries to offer free joints as incentives to get COVID-19 vaccination in an effort dubbed "Joints for Jabs".

=== Vaccine mandates ===
Mandatory vaccination is one set of policy measures to address vaccine hesitancy by imposing penalties or burdens on those who fail to vaccinate. An example of this kind of measure is Australia's vaccine mandates around childhood vaccination, the No Jab No Pay policy. This policy linked financial payments to children's vaccine status and, while studies have found significant improvements in vaccination compliance, years later there were still issues of vaccine hesitancy. In 2021, Australian airline Qantas issued plans to mandate COVID-19 vaccination for their work force.

== Policy implications ==
Multiple major medical societies including the Infectious Diseases Society of America, the American Medical Association, and the American Academy of Pediatrics support the elimination of all nonmedical exemptions for childhood vaccines.

=== Individual liberty ===
Compulsory vaccination policies have been controversial as long as they have existed, with opponents of mandatory vaccinations arguing that governments should not infringe on an individual's freedom to make medical decisions for themselves or their children, while proponents of compulsory vaccination cite the well-documented public health benefits of vaccination. Others argue that, for compulsory vaccination to effectively prevent disease, there must be not only available vaccines and a population willing to immunize, but also sufficient ability to decline vaccination on grounds of personal belief.

Vaccination policy involves complicated ethical issues, as unvaccinated individuals are more likely to contract and spread disease to people with weaker immune systems, such as young children and the elderly, and to other individuals in whom the vaccine has not been effective. However, mandatory vaccination policies raise ethical issues regarding parental rights and informed consent.

In the United States, vaccinations are not truly compulsory, but they are typically required in order for children to attend public schools. As of January 2021, five states – Mississippi, West Virginia, California, Maine, and New York – have eliminated religious and philosophical exemptions to required school immunizations.

=== Children's rights ===
Medical ethicist Arthur Caplan argues that children have a right to the best available medical care, including vaccines, regardless of parental feelings toward vaccines, saying "Arguments about medical freedom and choice are at odds with the human and constitutional rights of children. When parents won't protect them, governments must."

To prevent the spread of disease by unvaccinated individuals, some schools and doctors' surgeries have prohibited unvaccinated children from being enrolled, even where not required by law. Refusal of doctors to treat unvaccinated children may cause harm to both the child and public health, and may be considered unethical, if the parents are unable to find another healthcare provider for the child. Opinion on this is divided, with the largest professional association, the American Academy of Pediatrics, saying that exclusion of unvaccinated children may be an option under narrowly defined circumstances.

== History ==
=== Variolation ===
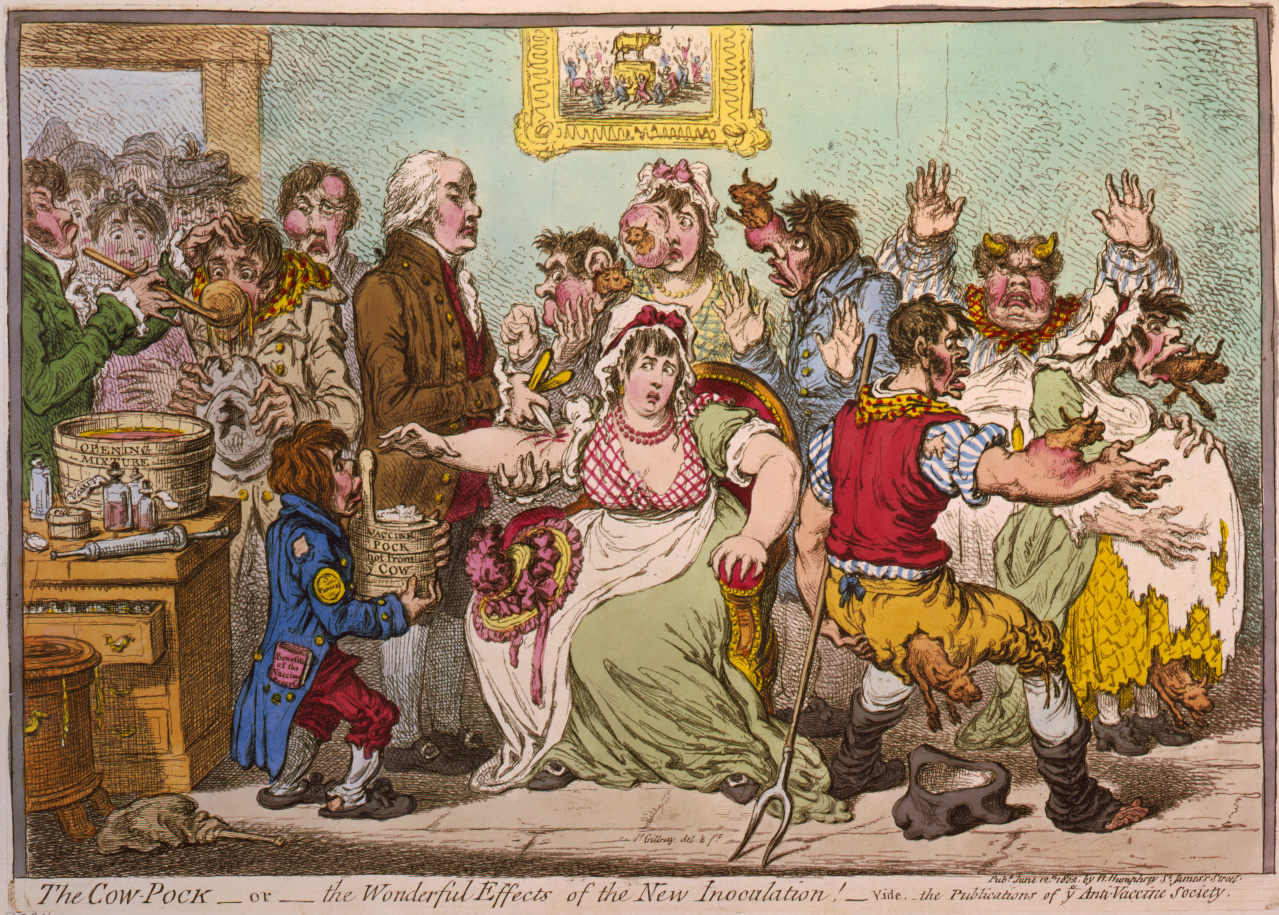
An anti-vaccination caricature by James Gillray, The Cow-Pock – or – The Wonderful Effects of the New Inoculation! (1802)

Early attempts to prevent smallpox involved deliberate inoculation with the milder form of the disease (Variola Minor) in the expectation that a mild case would confer immunity and avoid Variola Major. Religious arguments against inoculation were soon advanced. For example, in a 1722 sermon entitled "The Dangerous and Sinful Practice of Inoculation", the English theologian Reverend Edmund Massey argued that diseases are sent by God to punish sin and that any attempt to prevent smallpox via inoculation is a "diabolical operation". It was customary at the time for popular preachers to publish sermons, which reached a wide audience. This was the case with Massey, whose sermon reached North America, where there was early religious opposition, particularly by John Williams. A greater source of opposition there was William Douglass, a medical graduate of Edinburgh University and a Fellow of the Royal Society, who had settled in Boston.

=== Smallpox vaccination ===
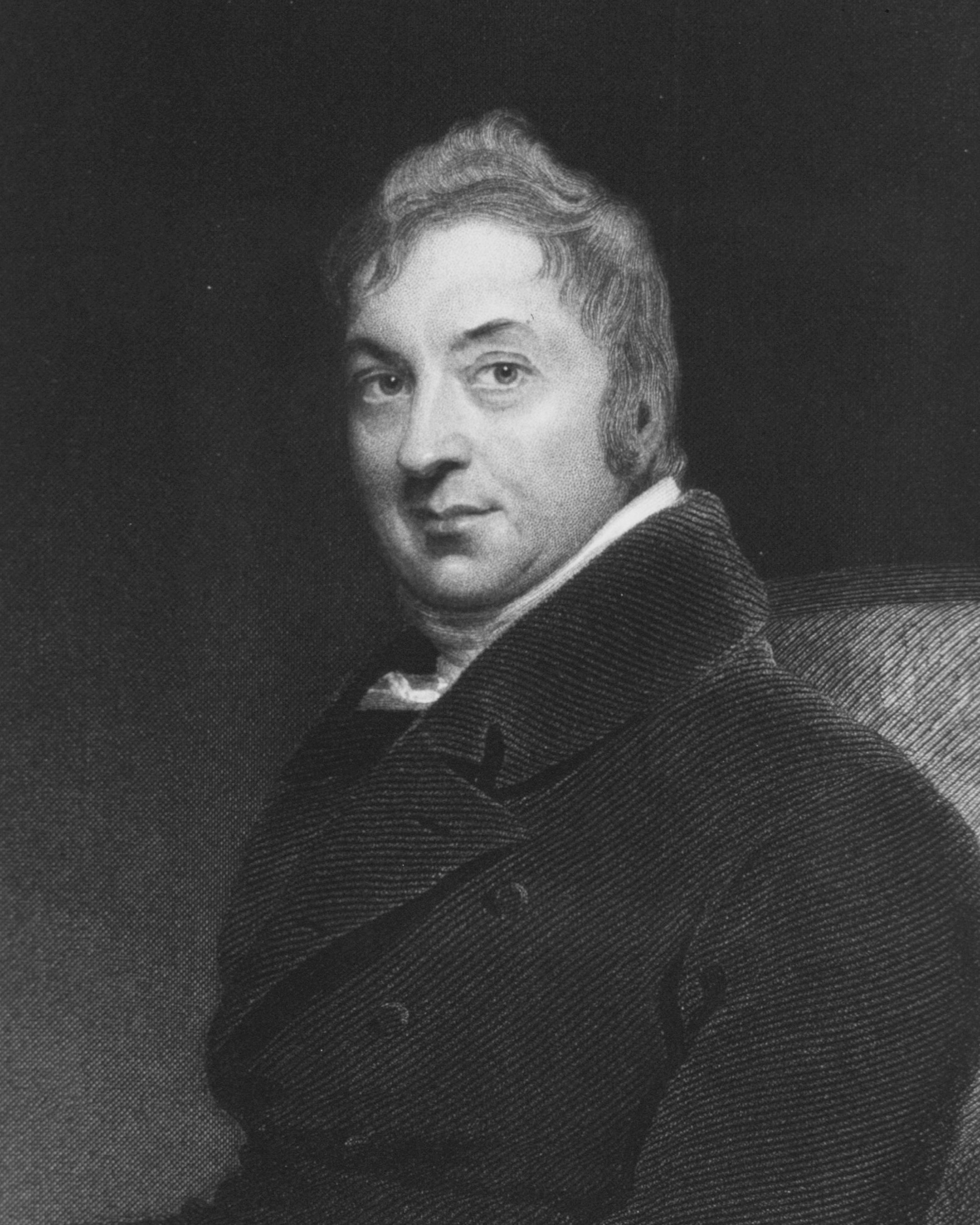
Edward Jenner

After Edward Jenner introduced the smallpox vaccine in 1798, variolation declined and was banned in some countries. As with variolation, there was some religious opposition to vaccination, although this was balanced to some extent by support from clergymen, such as Reverend Robert Ferryman, a friend of Jenner's, and Rowland Hill, who not only preached in its favour but also performed vaccination themselves. There was also opposition from some variolators who saw the loss of a lucrative monopoly. William Rowley published illustrations of deformities allegedly produced by vaccination, lampooned in James Gillray's famous caricature depicted on this page, and Benjamin Moseley likened cowpox to syphilis, starting a controversy that would last into the 20th century.

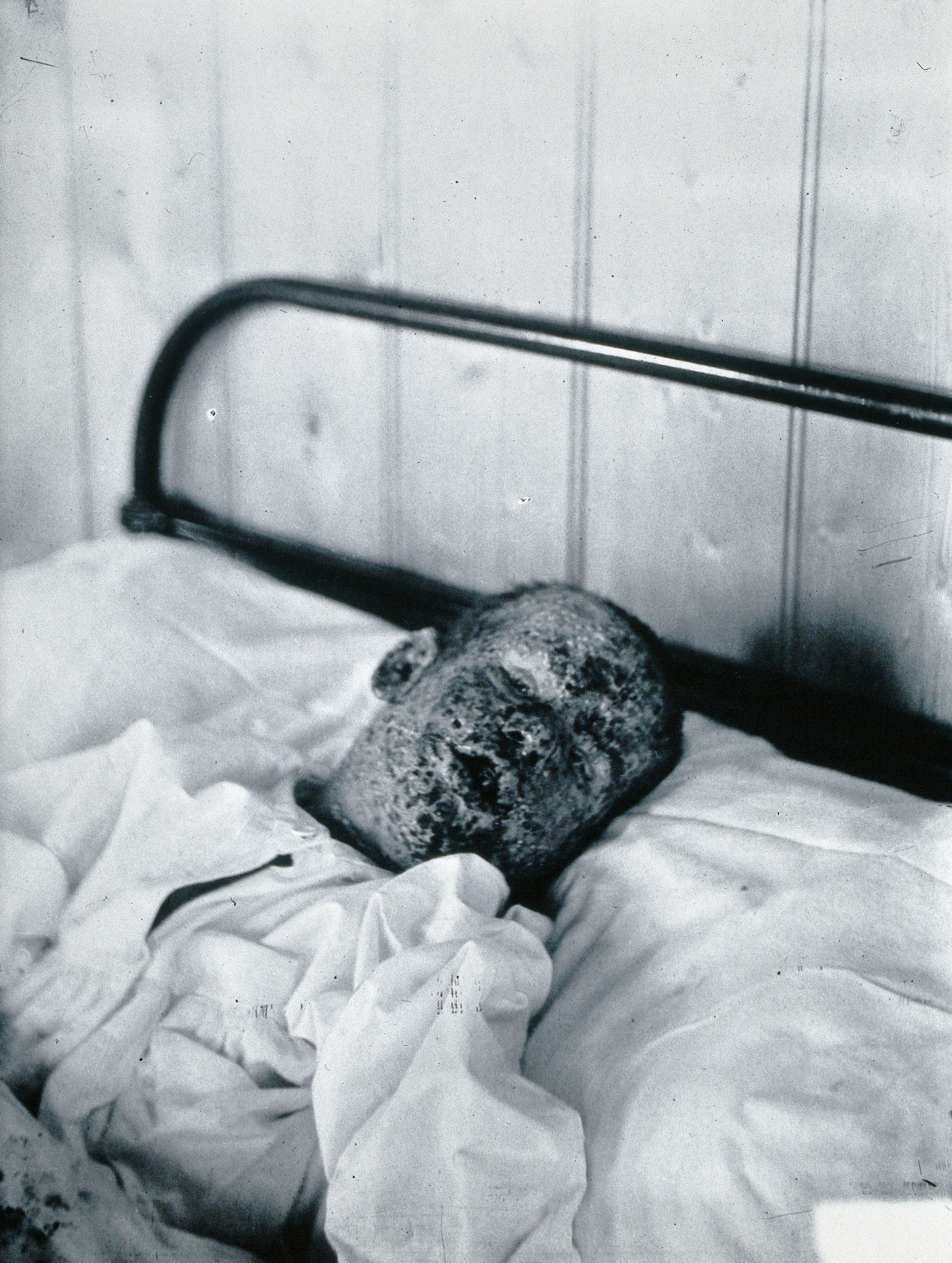
Henry Wicklin, age 6, affected by smallpox. Smallpox was eradicated worldwide as a result of mandatory vaccinations.

There was legitimate concern from supporters of vaccination about its safety and efficacy, but this was overshadowed by general condemnation, particularly when legislation started to introduce compulsory vaccination. The reason for this was that vaccination was introduced before laboratory methods were developed to control its production and account for its failures. Vaccine was maintained initially through arm-to-arm transfer and later through production on the skin of animals, and bacteriological sterility was impossible. Further, identification methods for potential pathogens were not available until the late 19th to early 20th century. Diseases later shown to be caused by contaminated vaccine included erysipelas, tuberculosis, tetanus, and syphilis. This last, though rare – estimated at 750 cases in 100 million vaccinations – attracted particular attention. Much later, Charles Creighton, a leading medical opponent of vaccination, claimed that the vaccine itself was a cause of syphilis and devoted a book to the subject. As cases of smallpox started to occur in those who had been vaccinated earlier, supporters of vaccination pointed out that these were usually very mild and occurred years after the vaccination. In turn, opponents of vaccination pointed out that this contradicted Jenner's belief that vaccination conferred complete protection. The views of opponents of vaccination that it was both dangerous and ineffective led to the development of determined anti-vaccination movements in England when legislation was introduced to make vaccination compulsory.

==== England ====
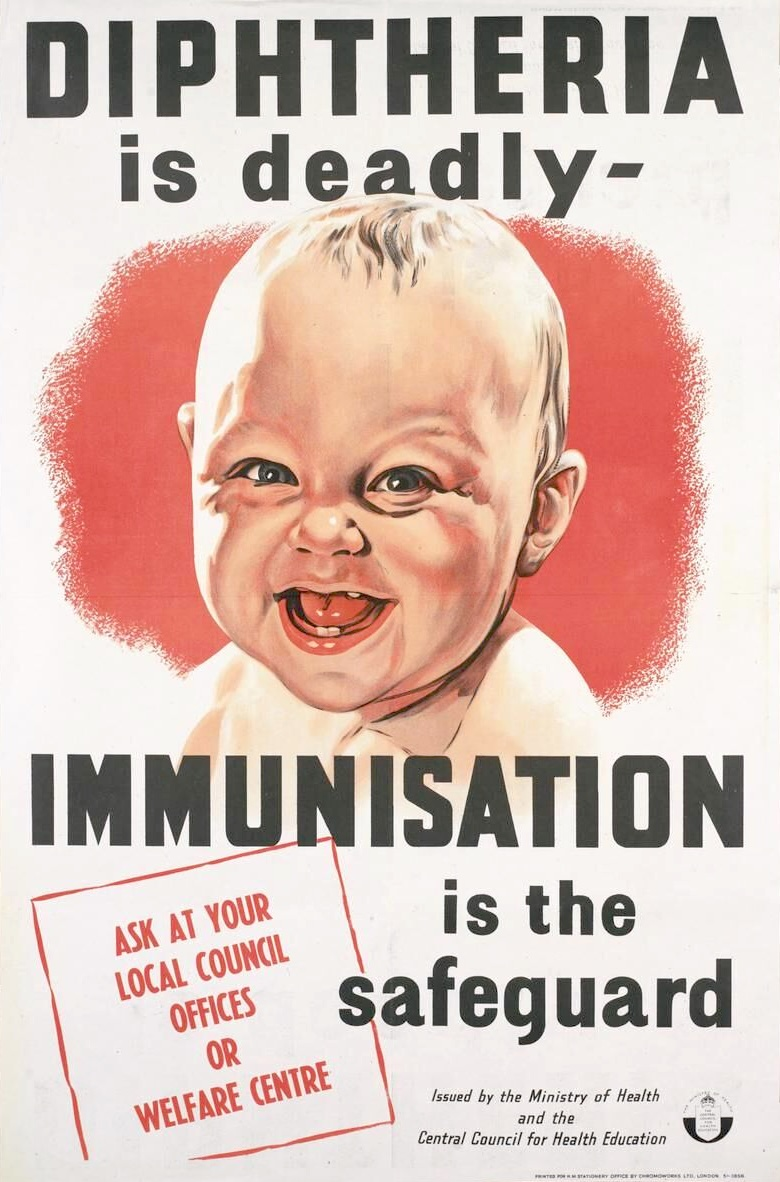
In a postwar poster, the Ministry of Health urged British residents to immunize children against diphtheria.

Because of its greater risks, variolation was banned in England by the Vaccination Act 1840 (3 & 4 Vict. c. 29), which also introduced free voluntary vaccination for infants. Thereafter Parliament passed successive acts to enact and enforce compulsory vaccination. The Vaccination Act 1853 (16 & 17 Vict. c. 100) introduced compulsory vaccination, with fines for non-compliance and imprisonment for non-payment. The Vaccination Act 1867 (30 & 31 Vict. c. 84) extended the age requirement to 14 years and introduced repeated fines for repeated refusal for the same child. Initially, vaccination regulations were organised by the local Poor Law Guardians, and in towns where there was strong opposition to vaccination, sympathetic guardians were elected who did not pursue prosecutions. This was changed by the Vaccination Act 1871 (34 & 35 Vict. c. 98), which required guardians to act. This significantly changed the relationship between the government and the public, and organized protests increased. In Keighley, Yorkshire, in 1876 the guardians were arrested and briefly imprisoned in York Castle, prompting large demonstrations in support of the "Keighley Seven". The protest movements crossed social boundaries. The financial burden of fines fell hardest on the working class, who would provide the largest numbers at public demonstrations. Societies and publications were organized by the middle classes, and support came from celebrities such as George Bernard Shaw and Alfred Russel Wallace, doctors such as Charles Creighton and Edgar Crookshank, and parliamentarians such as Jacob Bright and James Allanson Picton. By 1885, with over 3,000 prosecutions pending in Leicester, a mass rally there was attended by over 20,000 protesters.

Under increasing pressure, the government appointed a Royal Commission on Vaccination in 1889, which issued six reports between 1892 and 1896, with a detailed summary in 1898. Its recommendations were incorporated into the Vaccination Act 1898 (61 & 62 Vict. c. 49), which still required compulsory vaccination but allowed exemption on the grounds of conscientious objection on presentation of a certificate signed by two magistrates. These were not easy to obtain in towns where magistrates supported compulsory vaccination, and after continued protests, a further act in 1907 allowed exemption on a simple signed declaration. Although this solved the immediate problem, the compulsory vaccination acts remained legally enforceable, and determined opponents lobbied for their repeal. No Compulsory Vaccination was one of the demands of the 1900 Labour Party General Election Manifesto. This was done as a matter of routine when the National Health Service was introduced in 1948, with "almost negligible" opposition from supporters of compulsory vaccination.

Vaccination in Wales was covered by English legislation, but the Scottish legal system was separate. Vaccination was not made compulsory there until 1863, and a conscientious objection was allowed after vigorous protest only in 1907.

In the late 19th century, Leicester in the UK received much attention because of how smallpox was managed there. There was particularly strong opposition to compulsory vaccination, and medical authorities had to work within this framework. They developed a system that did not use vaccination but was based on the notification of cases, the strict isolation of patients and contacts, and the provision of isolation hospitals. This proved successful but required acceptance of compulsory isolation rather than vaccination. C. Killick Millard, initially, a supporter of compulsory vaccination was appointed Medical Officer of Health in 1901. He moderated his views on compulsion but encouraged contacts and his staff to accept vaccination. This approach, developed initially due to overwhelming opposition to government policy, became known as the Leicester Method. In time it became generally accepted as the most appropriate way to deal with smallpox outbreaks and was listed as one of the "important events in the history of smallpox control" by those most involved in the World Health Organization's successful Smallpox Eradication Campaign. The final stages of the campaign generally referred to as "surveillance containment", owed much to the Leicester method.

==== United States ====
After an 1879 visit to New York by prominent British anti-vaccinationist William Tebb, The Anti-Vaccination Society of America was founded. The New England Anti-Compulsory Vaccination League formed in 1882, and the Anti-Vaccination League of New York City in 1885. Tactics in the US largely followed those used in England. Vaccination in the US was regulated by individual states, in which there followed a progression of compulsion, opposition, and repeal similar to that in England. Although generally organized on a state-by-state basis, the vaccination controversy reached the US Supreme Court in 1905. There, in the case of Jacobson v. Massachusetts, the court ruled that states have the authority to require vaccination against smallpox during a smallpox epidemic.

John Pitcairn, the wealthy founder of the Pittsburgh Plate Glass Company (now PPG Industries), emerged as a major financier and leader of the American anti-vaccination movement. On March 5, 1907, in Harrisburg, Pennsylvania, he delivered an address to the Committee on Public Health and Sanitation of the Pennsylvania General Assembly criticizing vaccination. He later sponsored the National Anti-Vaccination Conference, which, held in Philadelphia in October 1908, led to the creation of The Anti-Vaccination League of America. When the league organized later that month, members chose Pitcairn as their first president. On December 1, 1911, Pitcairn was appointed by Pennsylvania Governor John K. Tener to the Pennsylvania State Vaccination Commission and subsequently authored a detailed report strongly opposing the commission's conclusions. He remained a staunch opponent of vaccination until his death in 1916.

==== Brazil ====
In November 1904, in response to years of inadequate sanitation and disease, followed by a poorly explained public health campaign led by the renowned Brazilian public health official Oswaldo Cruz, citizens and military cadets in Rio de Janeiro arose in a Revolta da Vacina, or Vaccine Revolt. Riots broke out on the day a vaccination law took effect; vaccination symbolized the most feared and most tangible aspect of a public health plan that included other features, such as urban renewal, that many had opposed for years.

=== Later vaccines and antitoxins ===
Opposition to smallpox vaccination continued into the 20th century and was joined by controversy over new vaccines and the introduction of antitoxin treatment for diphtheria. Injection of horse serum into humans as used in antitoxin can cause hypersensitivity, commonly referred to as serum sickness. Moreover, the continued production of the smallpox vaccine in animals and the production of antitoxins in horses prompted anti-vivisectionists to oppose vaccination.

Diphtheria antitoxin was serum from horses that had been immunized against diphtheria, and was used to treat human cases by providing passive immunity. In 1901, antitoxin from a horse named Jim was contaminated with tetanus and killed 13 children in St. Louis, Missouri. This incident, together with nine deaths from tetanus from contaminated smallpox vaccine in Camden, New Jersey, led directly and quickly to the passing of the Biologics Control Act in 1902. The Bundaberg tragedy of 1928 saw a diphtheria antitoxin contaminated with the Staph. aureus bacterium kill 12 children in Bundaberg, Australia, resulting in the suspension of local immunisation programs.

Robert Koch developed tuberculin in 1890. Inoculated into individuals who have had tuberculosis, it produces a hypersensitivity reaction and is still used to detect those who have been infected. However, Koch used tuberculin as a vaccine. This caused serious reactions and deaths in individuals whose latent tuberculosis was reactivated by the tuberculin. This was a major setback for supporters of new vaccines. Such incidents and others ensured that any untoward results concerning vaccination and related procedures received continued publicity, which grew as the number of new procedures increased.

In 1955, in a tragedy known as the Cutter incident, Cutter Laboratories produced 120,000 doses of the Salk polio vaccine that inadvertently contained some live poliovirus along with inactivated virus. This vaccine caused 40,000 cases of polio, 53 cases of paralysis, and five deaths. The disease spread through the recipients' families, creating a polio epidemic that led to a further 113 cases of paralytic polio and another five deaths. It was one of the worst pharmaceutical disasters in US history.

Later 20th-century events included the 1982 broadcast of DPT: Vaccine Roulette, which sparked debate over the DPT vaccine, and the 1998 publication of a fraudulent academic article by Andrew Wakefield which sparked the MMR vaccine controversy. Also recently, the HPV vaccine has become controversial due to concerns that it may encourage promiscuity when given to 11- and 12-year-old girls.

Arguments against vaccines in the 21st century are often similar to those of 19th-century anti-vaccinationists. Around 2014, anti-vaccine rhetoric shifted from being mostly scientific and medical arguments, such as the idea that vaccines were harming children, to political arguments, such as what David Broniatowski of George Washington University has called a "don't-tell-me-what-to-do freedom movement." At the same time, according to Renée DiResta, a researcher at the Stanford Internet Observatory, anti-vaxxers began networking with Tea Party and Second Amendment activists in a "weird libertarian crossover". This happened partly due to anti-vaccine medical arguments failing to stop the passage of SB277 in California.

==== COVID-19 ====
After the December 2020 introduction of COVID vaccines, a partisan gap in death rates developed, indicating the effects of vaccine skepticism. As of March 2024, more than 30 percent of Republicans had not received a Covid vaccine, compared with less than 10 percent of Democrats.

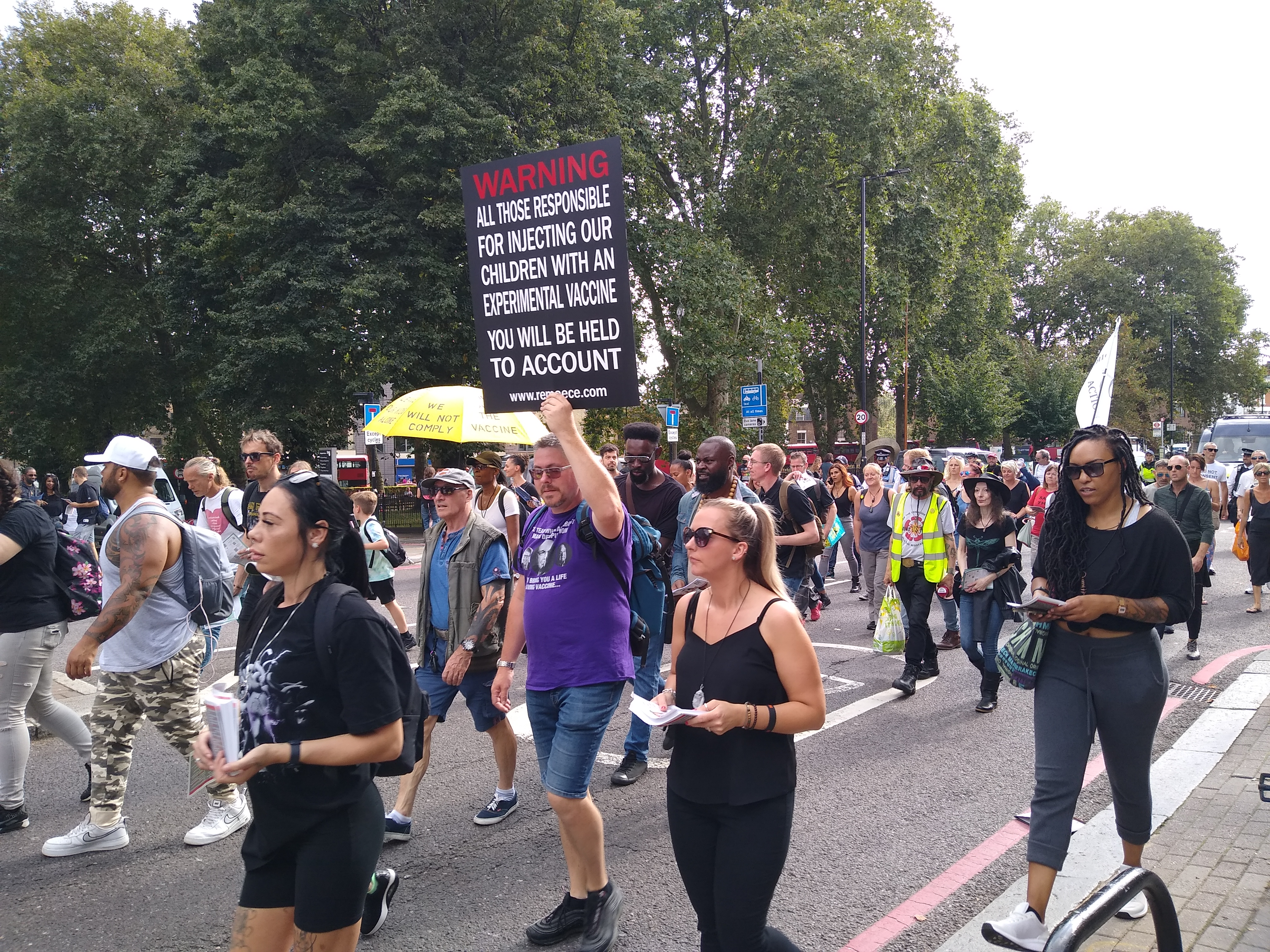
A protest against COVID-19 vaccination in London, United Kingdom

In mid-2020, surveys on whether people would be willing to take a potential COVID-19 vaccine estimated that 67% or 80% of people in the US would accept a new vaccination against COVID-19.

In the United Kingdom, a 16 November 2020 YouGov poll showed that 42% said they were very likely to take the vaccine and 25% were fairly likely (67% likely overall); 11% would be very unlikely and 10% fairly unlikely (21% unlikely overall) and 12% are unsure. There have been a number of reasons expressed why people might not wish to take COVID-19 vaccines, such as concerns over safety, self-perception of being "low risk", or questioning the Pfizer-BioNTech vaccine in particular. 8% of those reluctant to take it say it is because they oppose vaccinations overall; this amounts to just 2% of the British public.

A December 2020 Ipsos/World Economic Forum 15-country poll asked online respondents whether they agreed with the statement: "If a vaccine for COVID-19 were available, I would get it." Rates of agreement were smallest in France (40%), Russia (43%) and South Africa (53%). In the United States, 69% of those polled agreed with the statement; rates were even higher in Britain (77%) and China (80%).

A March 2021 NPR/PBS NewsHour/Marist poll found the difference between white and black Americans to be within the margin of error, but 47% of Trump supporters said they would refuse a COVID-19 vaccine, compared to 30% of all adults.

In May 2021, a report titled "Global attitudes towards a COVID-19 vaccine" from the Institute of Global Health Innovation and Imperial College London, which included detailed survey data from March to May 2021 including survey data from 15 countries Australia, Canada, Denmark, France, Germany, Israel, Italy, Japan, Norway, Singapore, South Korea, Spain, Sweden, the UK, and the US. It found that in 13 of the 15 countries more than 50% of people were confident in COVID-19 vaccines. In the UK 87% of survey respondents said they trusted the vaccines, which showed a significant increase in confidence following earlier less reliable polls. The survey also found trust in different vaccine brands varied, with the Pfizer–BioNTech COVID-19 vaccine being the most trusted across all age groups in most countries and particularly the most trusted for under 65s.

A January 2022 report from Time magazine noted that the anti-vaccine movement "has repositioned itself as an opposition to mandates and government overreach." A May 2022 report from The New York Times noted that "A wave of parents has been radicalized by Covid-era misinformation to reject ordinary childhood immunizations—with potentially lethal consequences."

=== Events following reductions in vaccination ===
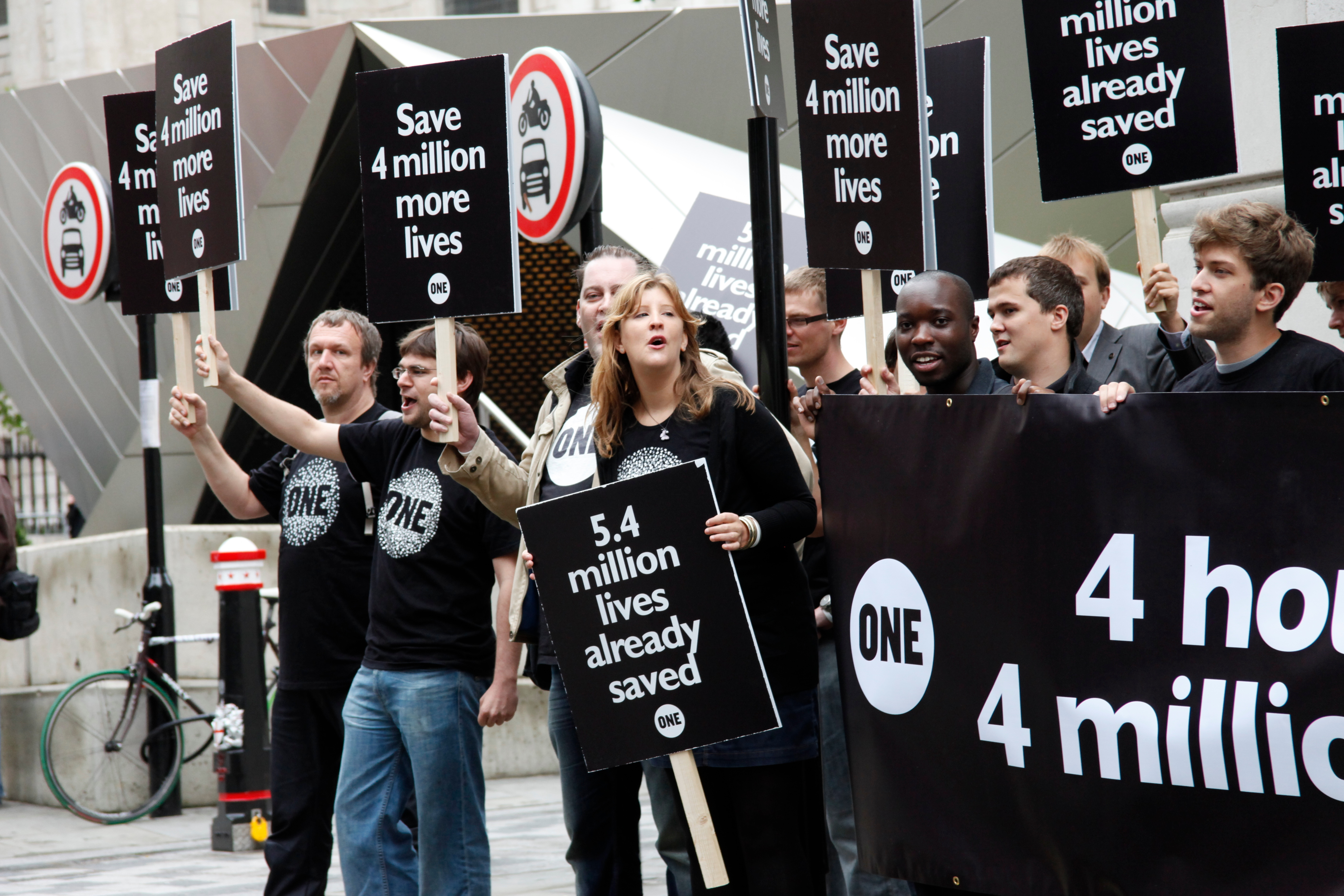
Campaigners in London for expanded vaccination in the developing world

In several countries, reductions in the use of some vaccines were followed by increases in the diseases' morbidity and mortality. According to the Centers for Disease Control and Prevention, continued high levels of vaccine coverage are necessary to prevent a resurgence of diseases that have been nearly eliminated. Pertussis remains a major health problem in developing countries, where mass vaccination is not practiced; the World Health Organization estimates it caused 294,000 deaths in 2002. Vaccine hesitancy has contributed to the resurgence of preventable disease. For example, in 2019, the number of measles cases increased by thirty percent worldwide and many cases occurred in countries that had nearly eliminated measles.

==== Stockholm, smallpox (1873–74) ====
An anti-vaccination campaign motivated by religious objections, concerns about effectiveness, and concerns about individual rights led to the vaccination rate in Stockholm dropping to just over 40%, compared to about 90% elsewhere in Sweden. A major smallpox epidemic began there in 1873. It led to a rise in vaccine uptake and an end of the epidemic.

==== UK, pertussis (1970s–80s) ====
In a 1974 report ascribing 36 reactions to whooping cough (pertussis) vaccine, a prominent public-health academic claimed that the vaccine was only marginally effective and questioned whether its benefits outweigh its risks, and extended television and press coverage caused a scare. Vaccine uptake in the UK decreased from 81% to 31%, and pertussis epidemics followed, leading to the deaths of some children. The mainstream medical opinion continued to support the effectiveness and safety of the vaccine; public confidence was restored after the publication of a national reassessment of vaccine efficacy. Vaccine uptake then increased to levels above 90%, and disease incidence declined dramatically.

==== Sweden, pertussis (1979–96) ====
In the vaccination moratorium period that occurred when Sweden suspended vaccination against whooping cough (pertussis) from 1979 to 1996, 60% of the country's children contracted the disease before the age of 10; close medical monitoring kept the death rate from whooping cough at about one per year.

==== Netherlands, measles (1999–2000) ====
An outbreak at a religious community and school in the Netherlands resulted in three deaths and 68 hospitalizations among 2,961 cases. The population in the several provinces affected had a high level of immunization, with the exception of one of the religious denominations, which traditionally does not accept vaccination. Ninety-five percent of those who contracted measles were unvaccinated.

==== UK and Ireland, measles (2000) ====
As a result of the MMR vaccine controversy, vaccination rates dropped sharply in the United Kingdom after 1996. From late 1999 until the summer of 2000, there was a measles outbreak in North Dublin, Ireland. At the time, the national immunization level had fallen below 80%, and in parts of North Dublin the level was around 60%. There were more than 100 hospital admissions from over 300 cases. Three children died and several more were gravely ill, some requiring mechanical ventilation to recover.

==== Nigeria, polio, measles, diphtheria (2001–) ====
In the early first decade of the 21st century, conservative religious leaders in northern Nigeria, suspicious of Western medicine, advised their followers not to have their children vaccinated with the oral polio vaccine. The boycott was endorsed by the governor of Kano State, and immunization was suspended for several months. Subsequently, polio reappeared in a dozen formerly polio-free neighbors of Nigeria, and genetic tests showed the virus was the same one that originated in northern Nigeria. Nigeria had become a net exporter of the poliovirus to its African neighbors. People in the northern states were also reported to be wary of other vaccinations, and Nigeria reported over 20,000 measles cases and nearly 600 deaths from measles from January through March 2005. In Northern Nigeria, it is a common belief that vaccination is a strategy created by the westerners to reduce the Northerners' population. As a result of this belief, a large number of Northerners reject vaccination. In 2006, Nigeria accounted for over half of all new polio cases worldwide. Outbreaks continued thereafter; for example, at least 200 children died in a late-2007 measles outbreak in Borno State.

==== United States, measles (2005–) ====
In 2000, measles was declared eliminated from the United States because the internal transmission had been interrupted for one year; the remaining reported cases were due to importation.

A 2005 measles outbreak in the US state of Indiana was attributed to parents who had refused to have their children vaccinated.

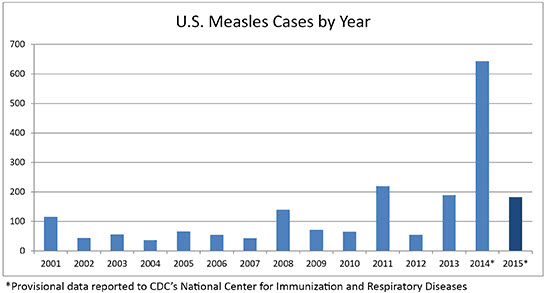

The Centers for Disease Control and Prevention (CDC) reported that the three biggest outbreaks of measles in 2013 were attributed to clusters of people who were unvaccinated due to their philosophical or religious beliefs. As of August 2013, three pockets of outbreak – New York City, North Carolina, and Texas – contributed to 64% of the 159 cases of measles reported in 16 states.

The number of cases in 2014 quadrupled to 644, including transmission by unvaccinated visitors to Disneyland in California, during the Disneyland measles outbreak. Some 97% of cases in the first half of the year were confirmed to be due directly or indirectly to importation (the remainder were unknown), and 49% from the Philippines. More than half the patients (165 out of 288, or 57%) during that time were confirmed to be unvaccinated by choice; 30 (10%) were confirmed to have been vaccinated. The final count of measles in 2014 was 668 cases in 27 states.

From January 1 to June 26, 2015, 178 people from 24 states and the District of Columbia were reported to have measles. Most of these cases (117 cases [66%]) were part of a large multi-state outbreak linked to Disneyland in California, continued from 2014. Analysis by the CDC scientists showed that the measles virus type in this outbreak (B3) was identical to the virus type that caused the large measles outbreak in the Philippines in 2014. On July 2, 2015, the first confirmed death from measles in twelve years was recorded. An immunocompromised woman in Washington State was infected and later died of pneumonia due to measles.

By July 2016, a three-month measles outbreak affecting at least 22 people was spread by unvaccinated employees of the Eloy, Arizona detention center, an Immigration and Customs Enforcement (ICE) facility owned by for-profit prison operator CoreCivic. Pinal County's health director presumed the outbreak likely originated with a migrant, but detainees had since received vaccinations. However convincing CoreCivic's employees to become vaccinated or demonstrate proof of immunity was much more difficult, he said.

In spring 2017, a measles outbreak occurred in Minnesota. As of June 16, 78 cases of measles had been confirmed in the state, 71 were unvaccinated and 65 were Somali-Americans. The outbreak has been attributed to low vaccination rates among Somali-American children, which can be traced back to 2008, when Somali parents began to express concern about disproportionately high numbers of Somali preschoolers in special education classes who were receiving services for autism spectrum disorder. Around the same time, disgraced former doctor Andrew Wakefield visited Minneapolis, teaming up with anti-vaccine groups to raise concerns that vaccines were the cause of autism, despite the fact that multiple studies have shown no connection between the MMR vaccine and autism.

From fall 2018 to early 2019, New York State experienced an outbreak of over 200 confirmed measles cases. Many of these cases were attributed to ultra-Orthodox Jewish communities with low vaccination rates in areas within Brooklyn and Rockland County. State Health Commissioner Howard Zucker stated that this was the worst outbreak of measles in his recent memory.

In January 2019, Washington state reported an outbreak of at least 73 confirmed cases of measles, most within Clark County, which has a higher rate of vaccination exemptions compared to the rest of the state. This led state governor Jay Inslee to declare a state of emergency, and the state's congress to introduce legislation to disallow vaccination exemption for personal or philosophical reasons.

==== Wales, measles (2013–) ====
In 2013, an outbreak of measles occurred in the Welsh city of Swansea. One death was reported. Some estimates indicate that while MMR uptake for two-year-olds was at 94% in Wales in 1995, it had fallen to as low as 67.5% in Swansea by 2003, meaning the region had a "vulnerable" age group. This has been linked to the MMR vaccine controversy, which caused a significant number of parents to fear allowing their children to receive the MMR vaccine. June 5, 2017, saw a new measles outbreak in Wales, at Lliswerry High School in the town of Newport.

==== United States, tetanus ====
Most cases of pediatric tetanus in the U.S. occur in unvaccinated children. In Oregon, in 2017, an unvaccinated boy had a scalp wound that his parents sutured themselves. Later the boy arrived at a hospital with tetanus. He spent 47 days in the Intensive Care Unit (ICU), and 57 total days in the hospital, for $811,929, not including the cost of airlifting him to the Oregon Health and Science University, Doernbecher Children's Hospital, or the subsequent two and a half weeks of inpatient rehabilitation he required. Despite this, his parents declined the administration of subsequent tetanus boosters or other vaccinations.

==== Romania, measles (2016–present) ====
Ovidiu Covaciu on how the Romanian antivaccine movement threatens Europe (2017)

As of September 2017, a measles epidemic was ongoing across Europe, especially Eastern Europe. In Romania, there were about 9300 cases, and 34 people (all unvaccinated) had died. This was preceded by a 2008 controversy regarding the HPV vaccine. In 2012, doctor Christa Todea-Gross published a free downloadable book online, this book contained misinformation about vaccination from abroad translated into Romanian, which significantly stimulated the growth of the anti-vaccine movement. The government of Romania officially declared a measles epidemic in September 2016 and started an information campaign to encourage parents to have their children vaccinated. By February 2017, however, the stockpile of MMR vaccines was depleted, and doctors were overburdened. Around April, the vaccine stockpile had been restored. By March 2019, the death toll had risen to 62, with 15,981 cases reported.

==== Samoa, measles (2019) ====
The 2019 Samoa measles outbreak began in October 2019 and as of December 12, there were 4,995 confirmed cases of measles and 72 deaths, out of a Samoan population of 201,316. A state of emergency was declared on November 17, ordering all schools to be closed, barring children under 17 from public events, and making vaccination mandatory. UNICEF has sent 110,500 vaccines to Samoa. Tonga and Fiji have also declared states of emergency.

The outbreak has been attributed to a sharp drop in measles vaccination from the previous year, following an incident in 2018 when two infants died shortly after receiving measles vaccinations, which led the country to suspend its measles vaccination program. The reason for the two infants' deaths was incorrect preparation of the vaccine by two nurses who mixed vaccine powder with expired anesthetic. As of November 30, more than 50,000 people were vaccinated by the government of Samoa.

== See also ==
- Chemophobia
- COVID-19 vaccine misinformation and hesitancy
- Measles resurgence in the United States
- Vaccine misinformation
- Therapeutic nihilism
- Vaccine shedding
