= Disneyland measles outbreak =

Event at Disneyland Resort, California

- Disease: Measles
- Pathogen: Measles morbillivirus
- Location: United States, Mexico, Canada
- First outbreak: December 2014
- First reported: January 5, 2015
- Confirmed cases: 131 in California; 16 in other US states; 159 in one Canadian community; One in Mexico
- Hospitalized cases: 10–20% of affected

The Disneyland measles outbreak began at the Disneyland Resort, California, in December 2014, and spread to seven states in the United States, Mexico, and Canada, before it was declared over in mid-April 2015.

The first case of measles was reported on January 5, 2015, in an unvaccinated 11-year-old Californian resident. Between December 2014 and March 2015, 131 Californians were infected, with almost 90% of cases occurring in southern California. Linked to the California cases were 16 cases in six other US states, 159 cases in a religious group in Québec, Canada, and one case in Mexico. Almost all the Canadian cases were unvaccinated. The source of the initial Disney theme park exposure was not identified, but specimens from several cases matched with the recent measles outbreak in the Philippines.

It triggered an international debate on vaccine hesitancy, particularly as it had spread to people who intentionally declined the vaccine and put vulnerable people who could not have the vaccine at risk. The outbreak prompted the California Senate Bill 277, laws that reverted the California personal belief vaccine exemption. Conclusions following examination of the outbreak pointed to undervaccination as a key cause.

== Background ==
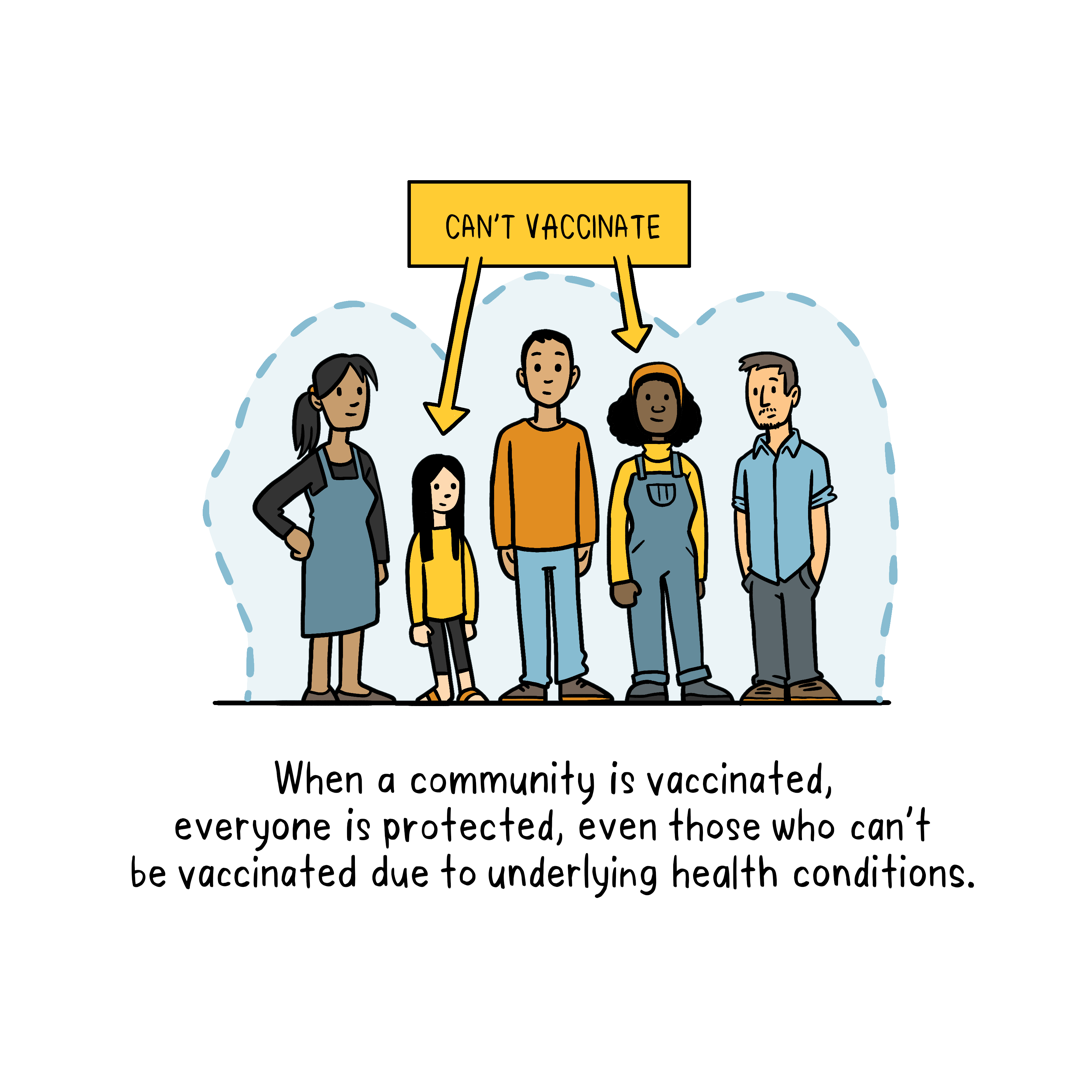
WHO: Herd Immunity

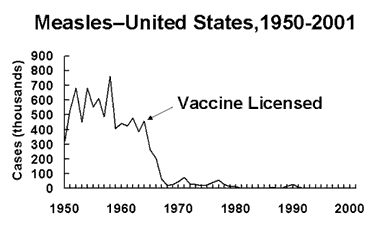
Measles incidence, showing decline to 2000 when US announced it was eliminated (CDC)

According to the Centers for Disease Control (CDC), the measles was a virus nearly all children obtained by the age of 15. There was an effort to make a vaccine against the measles that had success. Two doses of the measles vaccine provides 97% to 99% protection from acquiring the disease. Prevention of a measles outbreak requires around 95% of a population to be vaccinated with two doses of a measles vaccine. The few remaining that are unvaccinated or have not mounted an immune response from the measles vaccine, are protected by herd immunity. (Note: Looking at measles outbreaks in the 1980s, 65% were noted to have a first measles vaccine and analysis of the findings concluded that a failure to mount an immune response occurred in 4% of those vaccinated.)

In 2000, the US declared measles as eliminated due to an effective vaccination programme and public health response systems. Prior to the Disneyland measles outbreak of 2014–15, California saw increasing rates of non-medical vaccine exemptions, sometimes in clusters which left those communities susceptible to measles. Vaccine coverage at a quarter of California schools, including several around the Disneyland theme park, was too low for herd immunity. At the time, the Californian Disney theme parks received 24 million visitors a year.

== Outbreak ==
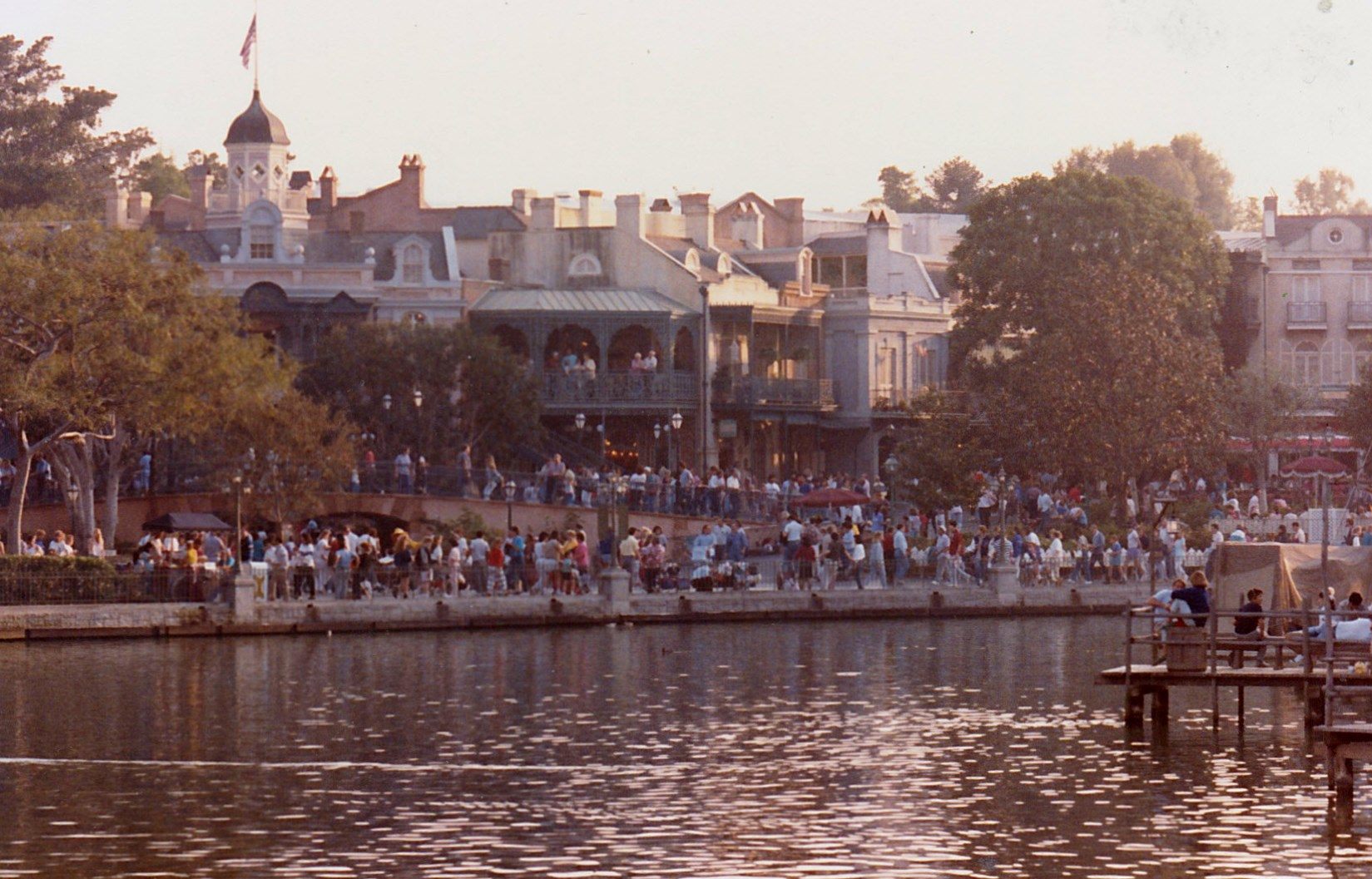
View of New Orleans Square from the island in 2014

On January 5, 2015, the California Department of Public Health (CDPH) first heard of a case of measles in a hospitalised 11-year old Californian resident whose rash started on December 28, 2014, and who had visited one of two neighbouring Californian Disney theme parks. Four more cases were reported on the same day, and all had visited the Disney theme parks between December 17 and 20. CDPH issued a press release on January 7, 2015, by which time there were seven cases.

By February 11, 2015, the Centers for Disease Control and Prevention (CDC) attributed 125 cases of measles across seven US states, 110 of which were in California, to the outbreak. 39 of the California cases had visited the Disney parks between December 17 and 20, and 34 were secondary contacts. Of the other 15 cases linked to the Disneyland outbreak, seven were in Arizona, one in Colorado, one in Nebraska, one in Oregon, three in Utah, and two in Washington. Cases linked to the outbreak were reported in Mexico, and in Canada its Public Health Agency reported more than 150 cases of measles that were linked to one imported case from the Disneyland outbreak. Of the 110 Californian cases by February 2015, at least 13 were vaccinated against the measles, 1 had had prior infection or vaccination, and at least 49 were unvaccinated, 28 of whom held anti-vaccine beliefs. 12 cases, included in the unvaccinated total, occurred in infants too young to have the vaccine; they relied on herd immunity for protection. The remaining 47 had unknown or undocumented vaccination status. Almost all the Canadian cases were unvaccinated. Some cases occurred in people who had been vaccinated with two doses of the measles vaccine.

Between December 2014 and March 2015, 131 Californians were infected, with almost 90% of cases occurring in southern California. Linked to the California cases were 16 cases in six other US states, 159 cases in a religious group in Québec, Canada, and one case in Mexico. The outbreak was declared over in mid-April 2015. Conclusions following examination of the outbreak pointed to undervaccination as a key explanation. The source of the initial Disney theme park exposure was not identified, but specimens from several cases matched with the recent measles outbreak in the Philippines, but was also detected in at least 14 countries.

Contact tracing was implemented by local health agencies. To encourage vaccination, Roald Dahl's 1986 "Measles: A dangerous illness" open letter was recirculated as a result of the outbreak. The incident prompted the California Senate Bill 277, laws that reverted the California personal belief vaccine exemption.

== Reaction and aftermath ==
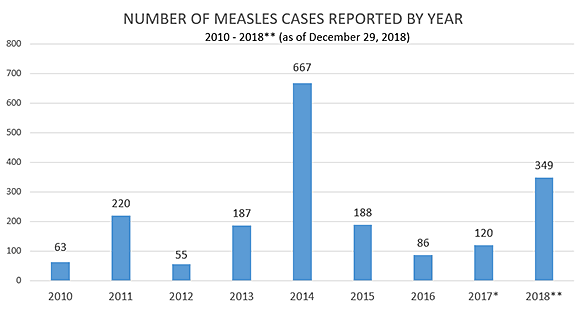
Resurgence of measles in US 2010–2018

Many people thought of measles as a disease of the past, and the Disneyland outbreak came as a surprise to them. It triggered an international debate on vaccine hesitancy, particularly as it had spread to people who intentionally declined the vaccine and put vulnerable people who could not have the vaccine, at risk. Headlines included "The good thing about the Disney measles outbreak", "Finally, California lawmakers say vaccination is a social responsibility", and "Oregon legislator wants to eliminate 'philosophical' vaccine exemption". One website reported "Mickey Mouse Gets the Measles" and one blog wrote "Space Mountain with a Side of Measles” and "Measles was not the name of an eighth 'Snow White' dwarf". Media coverage and social media posts focused on the harms of the "anti-vaxx" movement and resulted in a positive influence in vaccine uptake and the effect was dubbed by some as the "Disneyland effect". The term measles had its highest level of hits on Google Trends in over 10 years. National US surveys showed that more than half the population knew about the outbreak. Among Twitter users, the most common retweet was a post of a Forbes news article that described the outbreak as a "turning point in the vaccine wars." It argued that people generally wished to defend vaccination, although others doubted it.

Several studies subsequently looked at the effect of the Disneyland outbreak on people's views about vaccination. There was little inconsistency; a larger proportion of people reported more positive views towards vaccination. One study reported that a third of mothers showed more interest in the measles vaccine, another revealed that more than a third of pediatricians said that they had fewer requests for vaccine alternatives schedules, and a fifth reported stricter policies in vaccinating. Parents with higher educational levels felt more favourable towards vaccines in some studies, and one study reported more positive views towards vaccines in the white population and in those with higher incomes. Effect varied by population subgroup. Media coverage had likely encouraged favorable vaccine-related beliefs.

Between January 1 and December 31, 2019, 1,282 cases of measles were confirmed in 31 US states. One case that year was a person who visited Disneyland.

== See also ==
- Measles resurgence in the United States
