= California Senate Bill 277 =

Amendment to vaccination exemptions

California State Legislature
- Full name: California Senate Bill 277 (SB 277)
- Introduced: February 19, 2015
- Assembly voted: June 25, 2015 (46-31-3)
- Senate voted: June 29, 2015 (24-14-2)
- Signed into law: June 30, 2015
- Sponsor(s): Richard Pan, Ben Allen
- Governor: Jerry Brown
- Code: Health and Safety Code
- Section: 120325, 120335, 120370, 120375, 120338, and 120365
- Website: leginfo.legislature.ca.gov/faces/billNavClient.xhtml?bill_id=201520160SB277

Status: Amended

California Senate Bill 277 (SB277) is a California law that removed personal belief as a reason for an exemption from the vaccination requirements for entry to private or public elementary or secondary schools in California, as well as day care centers. The final version of the bill was enacted by the California Legislature in 2015 (passing the State Assembly on a 46–31 vote and the California State Senate on a 24–14 vote) and was signed into law by Governor Jerry Brown on June 30, 2015.

== Passage of bill ==
The bill, co-authored by California state Senators Richard Pan and Ben Allen, was prompted by the 2014 Disneyland measles outbreak and low levels of vaccination in pockets of California, with some schools having vaccination rates below 60%. SB277 was supported by the California Medical Association, as well as by the American Academy of Pediatrics' California affiliate; the California State PTA; the California Immunization Coalition; and the California Children's Hospital Association.

Opposition to the bill, albeit from "a tiny minority", has been characterized as "possibly the most strident outpouring of political dissent in recent memory". Prominent anti-vaccine activist Robert Sears argued against the bill's passage during an April 2015 Senate hearing; he claimed that access to non-medical exemptions was important because, in his experience, doctors often did not take reports of adverse vaccine reactions seriously and could not be relied upon to issue medically indicated exemptions. Anti-vaccine activists started a petition to have Pan removed by recall election, but failed to obtain the necessary number of voter signatures. Efforts by the Freedom Angels Foundation to place a referendum on the ballot to repeal SB 277 also failed. Opponents of the legislation vilified Pan on social media, comparing him to a Nazi; death threats were reported against both him and Ben Allen.

== Upheld by courts ==
During and after the passage of SB 277, legal scholars such as Dorit Rubinstein Reiss of the University of California, Hastings College of the Law and Erwin Chemerinsky and Michele Goodwin of the University of California, Irvine School of Law said that removal of non-medical exceptions to compulsory vaccination laws were constitutional, noting such U.S. Supreme Court cases as Zucht v. King (1922) and Prince v. Massachusetts (1944). After the passage of SB 277, groups of anti-vaccine parents challenged the law in court, arguing that it violated the right to an education, the right to religious freedom, and parental rights; these claims were rejected by the California state courts.

== Impact and limitations ==
Following the law's enactment, vaccination rates among California schoolchildren increased, although unjustified medical exemptions also increased. The 20% increase in medical exemptions was fueled by anti-vaccination parents who sought and received such exemptions. In Riverside County, the majority of medical exemptions reviewed by the county health department after the law's enactment were for all vaccinations indefinitely.

A 2019 study published in the journal Pediatrics, analyzing the effect of the law, determined that "the percentage of incoming kindergarteners up-to-date on vaccinations in California increased after the implementation of SB277," but there was a replacement effect: medical exemptions for independent study/homeschooled students largely offset "the decrease in the personal belief exemption rate from 2.37% to 0.56%." The study's correlational analysis also found "that previous geographic patterns of vaccine refusal persisted after the law's implementation."

In a separate 2019 study published in Pediatrics, Californian public health officials interviewed after SB 277's enactment said that, following the bill's passage, they faced an increasing amount of unusual reasons cited as justifications for medical exemptions, as well as the unethical practices by some physicians who charged parents a high fee in exchange for obtaining an unjustified medical exemption. SB 277 did not allow public health officials to oppose unjustified medical exemptions provided by physicians, and public health officials supported a change in the law to allow them to address abuses of the medical exemption process and thus decrease the possibility of infectious disease outbreaks.

A separate study, published in 2019 in PLOS Medicine used a synthetic control method to "implementation of the California policy that eliminated nonmedical childhood vaccine exemptions was associated with an estimated increase in vaccination coverage and a reduction in nonmedical exemptions at state and county levels," suggesting that the removal of non-medical vaccination exemptions "can be effective at increasing vaccination coverage." The study determined that the "observed increase in medical exemptions was offset by the larger reduction in nonmedical exemptions." The study found that the biggest gains in vaccine coverage were in the counties with the lowest vaccine coverage pre-SB 277.

== See also ==
- Measles resurgence in the United States
- Vaccination policy of the United States
