= Acquisition of 21st Century Fox by Disney =

Business acquisition held from 2017 to 2019

- Initiator: The Walt Disney Company
- Target: 21st Century Fox
- Type: Full acquisition; spin-off of certain assets
- Cost: US$71.3 billion
- Initiated: December 14, 2017; 8 years ago
- Completed: March 20, 2019; 7 years ago
- Resulting entity: Fox Corporation (spun-off assets)

The Walt Disney Company announced its acquisition of 21st Century Fox (21CF) on December 14, 2017. As part of their definitive agreement, Disney was to acquire Fox for $52.4 billion in stock (or 0.2745 Disney shares per 21CF share) and assume 21CF's debt obligations for $23.5 billion, totaling the transaction to approximately $66.1 billion. Due to Federal Communications Commission rules prohibiting a merger of two of the Big Four television networks, 21CF would spin-off certain assets, including the Fox Broadcasting Company, Fox Television Stations, Fox News, Fox Business, and Fox Sports, into a separate publicly-traded company immediately prior to the acquisition.

Disney's CEO Bob Iger came up with the idea of the acquisition after Disney acquired a majority control of BAMTech in 2015 as part of efforts to launch their own streaming service (ultimately named Disney+). Development of the acquisition began as early as November 2017, when Disney met with 21CF's CEO Rupert Murdoch to acquire 21CF's entertainment assets, including the 20th Century Fox film and television studios. Disney formally announced its acquisition of 21CF's entertainment assets the following month. Upon the initial announcement, concerns were raised about the acquisition's potential impact on the entertainment industry, as well as competition with other media companies.

In June 2018, following AT&T's acquisition of Time Warner (subsequently renamed WarnerMedia), Comcast initiated a rival all-cash bid of $65 billion for the targeted assets that Disney intended to purchase. In response, Disney increased its bid to $71.3 billion in cash and stock. After Fox agreed to Disney's amended offer, Comcast withdrew from the deal the following month to focus on its acquisition of Sky Group. The U.S. Justice Department gave antitrust approval to Disney on June 27, on the condition that Disney would divest Fox's regional sports networks. Disney and Fox shareholders approved the deal on July 27, 2018, and following approval from several worldwide regulators, the transaction closed on March 20, 2019.

Apart from the 20th Century Fox film and television studios, Disney also acquired Fox Networks Group, FX Networks, a 73% stake in National Geographic Partners, Indian television broadcaster Star India, and a 30% stake in Hulu. Most remaining assets, including the Fox network, Fox Television Stations, Fox News, Fox Business, Fox Sports 1, Fox Sports 2, Fox Deportes, and the Big Ten Network, were spun-off into Fox Corporation. Other assets such as the Fox Sports Networks and Sky were divested and sold off to Sinclair and Comcast, respectively. Following the acquisition, Disney slowly began phasing out the Fox branding to avoid confusion with Fox Corporation, starting with renaming 20th Century Fox, 20th Century Fox Television and Fox Searchlight Pictures, respectively, to 20th Century Studios, 20th Television and Searchlight Pictures in 2020. Disney also leased the Fox Studio Lot in Century City for seven years, after which 20th Century and other Disney assets formerly owned by Fox relocated to the Walt Disney Studios in Burbank, California.

== Background ==
21st Century Fox was an American media and entertainment company founded by Rupert Murdoch. It was created on June 28, 2013, when the entertainment and media assets of News Corporation were separated into a new company. The company began trading on the NASDAQ and the Australian Securities Exchange on July 1, 2013.

Murdoch served as chairman and CEO, and Chase Carey was president and chief operating officer. In 2014, the company created the roles of co-chairman and co-CEO, which were filled by Lachlan Murdoch and James Murdoch, respectively.

== History ==
=== Early developments (November 2017–April 2018) ===
==== Initial negotiations and strategic rationale (November–December 2017) ====
On November 6, 2017, CNBC reported The Walt Disney Company was negotiating a deal with Rupert Murdoch to acquire 21st Century Fox's filmed entertainment, cable entertainment, and direct broadcast satellite divisions, including 20th Century Fox, FX Networks, and National Geographic Partners. The deal would reportedly exclude the Fox Broadcasting Company, 20th Century Fox's studio lot (which would be leased to Disney for seven years), Fox Television Stations, Fox News Group, and Fox Sports, which would be spun off into a new independent company run by the Murdoch family.

According to Disney CEO Bob Iger, the idea of purchasing 21st Century Fox's assets came after Disney acquired majority control of the streaming company BAMTech with anticipation to develop its own streaming service, which would eventually launch in November 2019 as Disney+. It was less interested in 21st Century Fox's production capacities and more keen to acquire 21st Century Fox's own film and television libraries to help expand the streaming service's library. Additionally, as 20th Century Fox was the last major studio from the studio era to be acquired when Rupert Murdoch took full control in 1985, its film library was largely intact relative to its peers from that era such as MGM.

The two companies had done business in 2001, when Disney acquired Fox Family Worldwide from the original incarnation of News Corporation, which included the Fox Family Channel (afterwards rebranded to ABC Family and later Freeform), Saban Entertainment, and the international Fox Kids cable networks controlled by Fox Family Worldwide, among other assets.

The deal would also include 20th Century Fox's film rights to certain third-party franchises, such as X-Men, Deadpool, and Fantastic Four, the distribution rights to the original and prequel film trilogies of Star Wars (which were not owned by Marvel Entertainment and Lucasfilm, respectively, when Disney acquired those companies), as well as consolidate ownership of other franchises both share such as Home Alone, and give Disney access to adult animation with the ownership of The Simpsons (which Disney would fully embrace under the Disney moniker) and Family Guy (which in the following years after the acquisition would break the fourth wall by making inside jokes on what they were allowed to do now that they were owned by Disney).

Talks had stalled for the day without a deal being finalized, but it was reported on November 10 that the prospected deal had yet to be fully abandoned.

==== Competing bids and regulatory considerations (November 2017–February 2018) ====
The Comcast Center in Philadelphia, Pennsylvania

On November 16, it was reported that Comcast (parent company of NBCUniversal, Xfinity, and Comcast Spectacor), Verizon Communications, and Sony (parent company of Sony Pictures, Sony Music, and Sony Interactive Entertainment) had also joined Disney in a bidding war for 21st Century Fox. During a recent shareholders meeting, 21st Century Fox Co-chairman Lachlan Murdoch said 21st Century Fox was not in the category of "sub-scale" companies that were "finding it difficult to leverage their positions in new and emerging video platforms", but was instead a company that had "the required scale to continue to both execute on our aggressive growth strategy and deliver significant increased returns to shareholders".

Because Disney owns ABC, Comcast owns NBC, and 21st Century Fox owned the Fox Broadcasting Company, a full acquisition of 21st Century Fox by Disney or Comcast would have been illegal under the Federal Communications Commission (FCC)'s rules prohibiting a merger between any of two of the four major broadcast networks.

On November 28, while mentioning a rumor that the rumored negotiations between Disney and 21st Century Fox were progressing at a rapid pace, Mike Fleming Jr. of Deadline Hollywood commented, "given how Disney made the Marvel and Lucasfilm deals under the cone of silence, if this happens we'll probably only know it when it's announced. It is certainly being talked about today."

Rumors of a nearing deal continued on December 5, with additional reports suggesting the FSN regional sports networks would be included in the sale (assets that would likely be aligned with Disney's ESPN division).

On December 11, Comcast announced it was dropping its bid on the Fox assets. On December 14, Disney confirmed an all-stock transaction worth around $52.4 billion (0.2745 Disney shares per Fox share) to have Fox sell their entertainment assets to Disney, pending approval from the U.S. Department of Justice Antitrust Division.

In February, CNBC reported that, despite the Disney–Fox deal, Comcast might take action to outbid Disney's $52.4 billion offer, if AT&T's acquisition of Time Warner went through. Despite this, Fox President Peter Rice stated he was content with Disney's offer and that the Fox assets were "a great fit for Disney."

==== Legal challenges and corporate restructuring (March–April 2018) ====
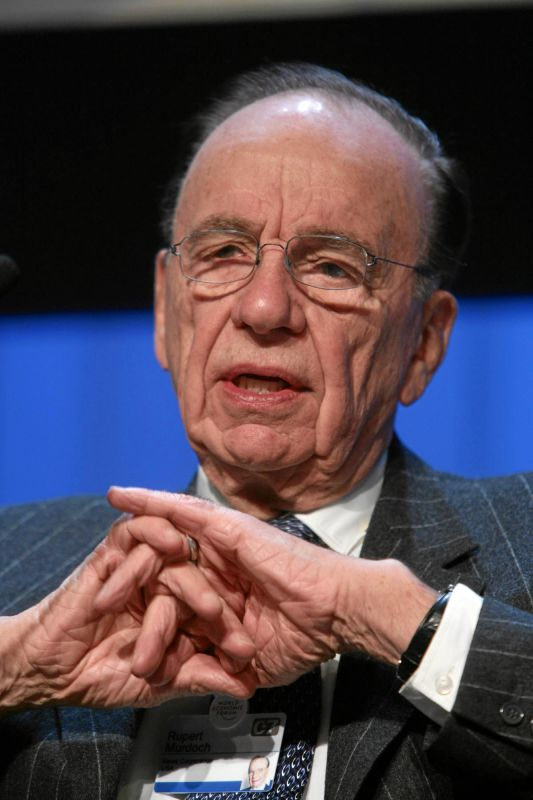
Rupert Murdoch at the World Economic Forum Annual Meeting Davos, 2007

Early in March, the non-profit group Protect Democracy Project Inc. filed a lawsuit against the U.S. Department of Justice (DOJ) on the hopes to seek any records of communications between the two groups over Disney's pending acquisition of Fox. The lawsuit also sought "any related antitrust enforcement efforts by the DOJ, to find out whether the president or his administration is improperly interfering with the independence of the DOJ out of favoritism for a political ally." Donald Trump congratulated Murdoch for the Disney–Fox deal while attacking AT&T's acquisition of Time Warner, particularly over the ownership of CNN, which he frequently criticized due to alleged bias.

On April 12, 2018, Rice revealed the acquisition was expected to close by summer 2019. Beginning in March 2018, a strategic reorganization of the Disney conglomerate saw the creation of two business segments, Disney Parks, Experiences and Products and Walt Disney Direct-to-Consumer & International. Parks & Consumer Products was primarily a merger of Parks & Resorts and Consumer Products & Interactive Media, while Direct-to-Consumer & International took over for Disney International and global sales, distribution, and streaming units from Disney–ABC Television Group, Studio Entertainment, and Disney Digital Network. Given that Iger described it as "strategically positioning our businesses for the future", The New York Times considered the reorganization done in expectation of the 21st Century Fox purchase.

=== Bidding war between Disney and Comcast (May–July 2018) ===
==== Early maneuvering and investor reactions (May 2018) ====
On May 7, 2018, it was reported that Comcast spoke to investment banks about topping Disney's offer to acquire Fox. Shortly afterwards, Iger stated he was willing to drop Sky plc from the deal to ensure the Fox acquisition.

Several Fox investors said they would be open to terminate the company's agreement with Disney if Comcast followed through on its plan to launch a rival all-cash bid for $60 billion. Murdoch's family trust controlled 39% of Fox due to shares it held with special voting rights. However, under the company's by-law, those special rights did not apply to a vote on the Disney/Fox deal when the Murdoch trust only controlled 17% of the vote, making it easier for other shareholders to defeat him, which was expected as early as next month. Later that month, it was confirmed that Lachlan Murdoch, rather than James Murdoch, would take charge of the new company tentatively known as "New Fox".

The following week, Comcast publicly announced it was looking into making an all-cash counter-offer for the Fox assets that Disney proposed to acquire. Shortly after, it was reported that Disney was looking into making its own all-cash counter-offer for Fox assets if Comcast went through with their offer.

The next day, Disney and Fox announced they had set their shareholder vote meetings for July 10, although both said Fox's meeting could be postponed if Comcast came through with their offer.

==== Escalating bids and antitrust approvals (June 2018) ====
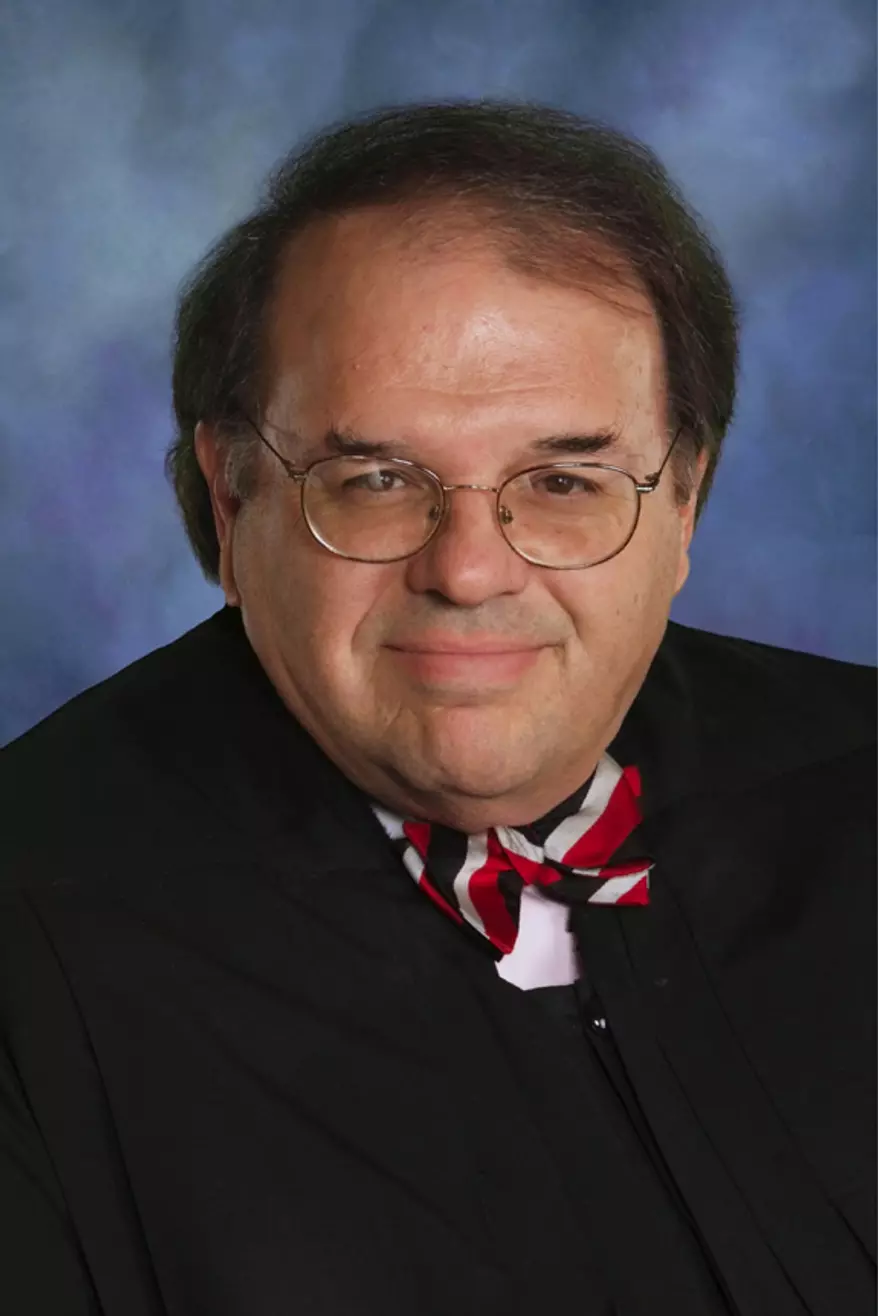
Judge Richard J. Leon

On June 12, AT&T was given approval by District Judge Richard J. Leon to acquire Time Warner, easing concerns Comcast had regarding whether government regulators would block their bid for Fox. Consequently, the next day, Comcast mounted an all-cash bid of $65 billion ($35 per share and a 19% premium over Disney's offer) for the 21st Century Fox assets that were set to be acquired by Disney.

On June 18, it was reported that Disney would upgrade its already-existing $52 billion claim to contest Comcast's proposed counter-offer for the Fox assets.

On June 20, Disney and Fox announced they had amended their previous merger agreement, upping Disney's offer to $71.3 billion (a 10% premium over Comcast's $65 billion offer), while also offering shareholders the option of receiving either cash ($38 per share) or stock (between 0.3324 and 0.4063 Disney shares per Fox share). On June 21, Murdoch said in response to Disney's higher offer: "We are extremely proud of the businesses we have built at 21st Century Fox, and firmly believe that this combination with Disney will unlock even more value for shareholders as the new Disney continues to set the pace at a dynamic time for our industry." That still would not have prevented other companies from making a bid, as the deal still needed to be voted on by shareholders.

Iger explained the reasoning behind the bid: "Direct-to-consumer distribution has actually become an even more compelling proposition in the six months since we announced the deal. There has just been not only a tremendous amount of development in that space, but clearly the consumer is voting—loudly."

On June 27, the United States Department of Justice gave antitrust approval to Disney under the condition the company sold Fox's 22 regional sports channels within 90 days of closing, to which the company agreed. The next day, Disney and Fox boards scheduled July 27, 2018 as the day shareholders voted on the sale of Fox's properties to Disney.

==== Lawsuits and conclusion of the bidding war (July 2018) ====
On July 9, a Fox shareholder filed a lawsuit to stop the acquisition from Disney, citing the absence of financial projections for Hulu. On the same day, CNBC reported Comcast was looking for companies that could take over Fox's Regional Sports Networks. The shareholder claimed that would've made Comcast's antitrust problems regarding the takeover of Fox assets easier as Comcast was preparing to make a new all cash counter-offer before July 27, 2018.

On July 12, the Department of Justice filed a notice of appeal with the D.C. Circuit to reverse the District Court's approval for AT&T's acquisition of Time Warner (which became WarnerMedia shortly afterward). Analysts said the chances of a victory by the DOJ were small, but would be the "final nail in the coffin for Comcast's Fox chase. This is a clear gift to Disney." On the next day, AT&T CEO Randall L. Stephenson gave an interview with CNBC, about Comcast's bid for Fox: "It probably can't help it. You're in a situation where two entities are bidding for an asset, and this kind of action can obviously influence the outcome of those actions."

On July 13, Disney received the support of the Institutional Shareholder Services and Glass Lewis, the two most prominent proxy adviser firms in the world. Fox shareholders were recommended by the advisers as means to provide for Disney's future.

On July 16, CNBC reported Comcast was unlikely to continue its bidding war with Disney to acquire Fox. Instead, Comcast would likely continue pursuing the 61% stake of Sky.

On July 19, Comcast officially announced it was dropping its bid on the Fox assets in order to focus on its bid for Sky. CEO Brian L. Roberts said "I'd like to congratulate Bob Iger and the team at Disney and commend the Murdoch family and Fox for creating such a desirable and respected company."

=== Road to completion (July 2018–March 2019) ===
==== Shareholder approvals and early regulatory review (July–October 2018) ====
On July 25, 2018, TCI Fund Management, the second largest shareholder of 21st Century Fox, indicated it voted to approve the Disney–Fox deal. On July 27, Disney and Fox shareholders approved the merger between the two companies.

There were reports on August 9 that Viacom CEO Bob Bakish wanted to license its television ad targeting tech to the entire industry, starting with Fox. On August 12, the Competition Commission of India (CCI) approved the Disney–Fox deal.

On September 17, the European Commission (EC) scheduled a merger review for October 19, which was later postponed to November 6.

On October 5, Disney announced the commencement of exchange offers and consent solicitations for 21st Century Fox.

==== Executive appointments and corporate restructuring (October 2018–January 2019) ====
Disney announced on October 8, 2018, 21st Century Fox's top television executives would join the company, including Peter Rice, Gary Knell, John Landgraf, and Dana Walden. Rice would serve as Chairman of Walt Disney Television and co-chair of Disney Media Networks, succeeding Ben Sherwood while Walden would be named Chairman of Disney Television Studios and ABC Entertainment. Disney announced on March 5, 2019, Craig Hunegs would lead the combined television operations at Disney Television Studios once the Disney–Fox deal closed. Hunegs would be president of the subsidiary, with oversight of all operations, including ABC Studios, ABC Signature, 20th Century Fox Television and Fox 21 Television Studios. He would report to Dana Walden, chairman of Fox Television Group who would be chairman of Disney Television Studios and ABC Entertainment.

On October 10, it was reported that the new, post-merger organizational structure of "New Fox" would be implemented by January 1, 2019, ahead of the closure of the Disney sale (which was still expected to occur during the first half of 2019).

On October 15, Disney offered a list of concessions to the EC, which extended the review deadline to November 6. On that day, the EC cleared the sale, pursuant to the divestment of certain factual television networks in Europe owned by A&E Networks, a joint venture between Disney and Hearst Communications, including Blaze, Crime & Investigation, History, H2, and Lifetime. Disney would continue to own 50% of A&E everywhere outside of the European Economic Area.

On October 18, 2018, Disney announced a new organizational structure for the Walt Disney Studios and the individual unit heads who would join the company except for Fox's filmed entertainment CEO Stacey Snider, including Emma Watts, Fox 2000 President of Production Elizabeth Gabler, Fox Searchlight Pictures Chairmen Nancy Utley and Stephen Gilula. Watts, who served as Vice Chairman and President of production at 20th Century Fox, would stay on in that post. All Fox film production units would report to Walt Disney Studios Chairman Alan Horn except for Fox Family and 20th Century Fox Animation reporting to Watts and Horn. By March 22, 2019, Fox Family only reports to Watts, with Fox Animation reporting only to Horn.

On November 18, the official name for "New Fox" was revealed to be "Fox Corporation."

On November 19, regulators in China approved the Disney–Fox deal, without any conditions. After obtaining approval from Chinese regulators, Disney said it still needed to obtain regulatory approval from several other regulators, though the approvals from the United States, European Union, and China were considered the most important hurdles to clear.

On December 3, Brazil's Administrative Council for Economic Defense (CADE) said the deal would concentrate the market of cable sports channels, and CADE recommended remedial measures.

On December 13, 2018, Disney announced a new organizational structure for its international operations and the individuals who would join the company, including Jan Koeoppen and Uday Shankar. Shankar, who served as chairman and President of Fox Networks Group Asia and Star India, would lead Disney's Asian operations and become the new Chairman of Disney India.

By December 14, the merger was subjected to regulation in Mexico, where Disney/Fox would account for 27.8% of content distribution across all genres. Disney would own 73% of all sports channels in Mexico. On January 31, Mexico's Federal Commission of Economic Competition (COFECE) approved the Disney–Fox deal after Disney agreed to sell its part in the Mexican distribution joint venture, Walt Disney Studios Sony Pictures Releasing de México, to Sony Pictures Entertainment Motion Picture Group.

On January 7, 2019, the registration statement for Fox Corporation, was filed with the U.S. Securities and Exchange Commission.

On January 11, it was reported that the deal was expected to close by either February or March 2019. However, on January 30, in a SEC filing by Disney, it was reported that the deal was expected to close by June 2019.

==== Final regulatory approvals and completion (February–March 2019) ====
Iger met with CADE on February 12, 2019, to discuss the deal. However, a decision on it still could not be reached. However, on February 20, Bloomberg said CADE would make its ruling on the deal on February 27. On February 21, Bloomberg reported Disney would divest Fox Sports in Brazil and Mexico to get approval in these countries, which were among the last major hurdles for the Disney–Fox deal. On February 27, CADE approved the merger with conditions requiring the aforementioned divestiture of the Brazilian Fox Sports, among other measures. The regulator said it coordinated with regulators in Mexico and Chile in evaluating the transaction. Brazil's approval cleared one of the final hurdles, allowing the deal to be completed in March.

In March, Disney tweaked Iger's compensation package he would receive upon closing the Disney–Fox deal, removing $13.5 million in potential salary and incentive awards available for the chief executive after the company closed its acquisition.

Mexico's telecom regulator Federal Telecommunications Institute (IFT) approved the deal on March 11, 2019, under the condition that Disney agreed to sell the country's Fox Sports within six months. It also had to keep the National Geographic brand separate from its A&E channels. This cleared the last major holdout on the deal. On March 12, 2019, Disney announced it was set to close the Fox deal in seven days.

Fox Corporation officially became a standalone, publicly traded company separate from 21st Century Fox on March 19, 2019, making Fox Corporation the owner of the assets that were not acquired by Disney. The announcement also included the appointment of the board of directors. Also on March 19, 21st Century Fox officially completed distribution of new Fox shares ahead of the completion of the Disney deal. The deal was officially completed that night. Under the terms of the acquisition, Disney would phase out Fox brand usage by 2024 to avoid consumer confusion in the marketplace.

== Assets ==
Disney acquired the majority of 21st Century Fox's entertainment assets. These assets included film studios such as 20th Century Fox (rebranded to 20th Century Studios in January 2020), Fox Searchlight Pictures (shortened to Searchlight Pictures that same month), and Fox 2000 Pictures (which was shut down on May 14, 2021); television production units 20th Century Fox Television (became 20th Television in August 2020) and Fox 21 Television Studios (becoming the second Touchstone Television that same month before being folded into 20th Television in December 2020); the international cable operations of Fox Networks Group (the U.S. operations, which included FX Networks, merged with Disney–ABC Television Group to form Walt Disney Television); a 73% stake in National Geographic Partners; and a 30% stake in the streaming service Hulu.

The Murdoch family kept ownership of 21st Century Fox's remaining assets under the Fox Corporation name. This remainder consists primarily of the Fox Broadcasting Company, Fox Television Stations (which retains the MyNetworkTV syndication service), Fox News Media (which includes the Fox News and Fox Business networks), and the U.S.-exclusive operations of Fox Sports (which retains cable channels such as FS1, FS2, Fox Deportes, and a 61% interest in the Big Ten Network). Fox Corporation also inherited the Fox Studio Lot in Century City; it has leased the lot to Disney for the acquired 21CF assets for licensing until 2026.

Several Disney and 21CF assets were initially included in the acquisition, but have since been sold off to third parties due to international regulations, competition from rival media companies, or Disney's lack of investment. One of the divested assets was Sky plc; 21CF sold its 39.14% stake in Sky to Comcast for £11.6 billion (US$15 billion) on September 26, 2018. Other divestments included the regional sports group Fox Sports Networks (sold to Sinclair Broadcast Group and Entertainment Studios on August 22, 2019, per U.S. Department of Justice mandate), a 50% stake in A&E Networks Europe (which was mandated by the European Commission and purchased by Hearst Communications in January 2019), the gaming assets of FoxNext (sold to Scopely in January 2020), Endemol Shine Group (which was a joint venture with Apollo Global Management and sold to Banijay on July 3, 2020), and a controlling interest in TeleColombia (sold to ViacomCBS (previously Paramount Global, later Paramount Skydance, now Skydance Corporation) on November 23, 2021).

== Criticism ==
Despite Disney passing antitrust approval from regulators in every country, there are significant antitrust concerns about Disney's purchase. The deal is a horizontal merger (i.e., in which a company buys up a corporation that produces the same goods and products) as opposed to a vertical merger (i.e., two companies that operate at separate stages of the production process for a specific finished product), much akin to the integrations of AT&T–Time Warner and Comcast–NBC Universal. Horizontal mergers are more likely to be disapproved than vertical mergers, as they affect a more tangible reduction in competition.

As both Disney and Fox create films and television series, the number of major film studios in Hollywood lowered from six to five. Some argued the operation would still leave many competitors around since Disney may compete with Netflix in the online streaming market with Disney+ and Hulu in equal conditions with its newly acquired properties. Opponents countered that these arguments do not hold much weight due to Disney's powerful box office and stock market shares, its practices and its purchase of Fox's many assets.

=== News media ===
A film reporter said, "They'll have more control over more things, so if they decide they don't like what you wrote and want to ban you from their screenings, eventually that will mean all of entertainment. For journalists and reporters trying to do their job, it is frightening to see the scope of one company expand in that way and know that your fate is kind of tied up with them." "We've seen a pattern in Disney's behavior. The more power they have, the more they wield it," one entertainment reporter said. A freelance critic and member of the New York Film Critics Circle said that they were troubled by the idea of the Disney–Fox deal.

On November 3, 2017, Disney banned the Los Angeles Times from attending press screenings of its films in retaliation for the paper's coverage of their political influence in Anaheim, California in September of that year. On November 7, however, Disney reversed its decision, after receiving massive protests and condemnation from a number of major publications and writers including The New York Times, The Boston Globe critic Ty Burr, The Washington Post blogger Alyssa Rosenberg, A Wrinkle in Time director Ava DuVernay, the websites The A.V. Club and Flavorwire, and film critic organizations which threatened to disqualify Disney films from their year-end awards in retaliation, specifically, the National Society of Film Critics, Los Angeles Film Critics Association, New York Film Critics Circle, and Boston Society of Film Critics.

Jason Bailey, the editor of Flavorwire, thought the way Disney treated the Los Angeles Times was "absolutely chilling", fearing it would only grow more common after the merger:

The idea of a major, multinational conglomerate being that petty and vindictive and really engaging in an act of retribution against an outlet, and against reporters who had nothing to do with the thing that they were angry about, gave some insight into the length they were willing to go against anyone who didn't toe the Disney company line. It's very worrisome, and is more worrisome if they're in control of this much more of the entertainment industry.

One film writer stated that "I personally worry that a studio this big will need the press less and less. I don't think anything drastic will change immediately, but I think it is more important than ever for entertainment reporters to uphold journalistic values. We are not their PR arms, no matter how much they'd like us to be." Another film reporter said, "As a critic, I've had Disney tell me they don't want to invite me to [its] film because I didn't like the last one. It really scares me to watch them get even more power."

=== Theaters ===
Disney has a reputation for imposing strict conditions for theater owners to screen its films, such as Star Wars: The Last Jedi. For that movie, Disney demanded a 65% cut of domestic ticket sales along with a four-week hold in each venue, and a 5% penalty to any theater owner who breaks any part of the contract, including taking the film off-screen. If the Disney–Fox deal had happened in late 2016, Disney's domestic box office in 2017 would have equaled $4.5 billion or 40% market share, a figure no major studio has ever hit. For some, the deal would give Disney unprecedented market power in the industry.

One distribution studio executive denounced the deal, saying that "If I was an independent mom-and-pop theater, I would just close down; there's no way to survive. With a 40% market share, how do you negotiate against that?" John Roper, the general manager of the Phoenix Theatre in Fort Nelson, British Columbia, said that Disney/Fox had him worried about even stricter rules in the future, stating, "It's not good for any type of industry when a company grows that large. Disney holds all the cards, and we have to play by their rules. Smaller cinemas are just left in the dust." Roper decided not to screen Star Wars: The Last Jedi because of Disney's strict conditions of requiring the theater to run the film four weeks straight and play it four times a day (as opposed to other studios, who only require a minimum of two weeks for a film run and play it one time a day). Elkader Cinema in Elkader, Iowa, opted out the movie for the same reason, with owner Lee Akin stating that "I can't get the entire town in my auditorium in one week's time let alone four."

In Brazil, Disney demanded a 52% cut of Coco's domestic ticket sales (rather than the historical 50% cut) and some theaters (with exceptions including foreign chains, such as Cinemark Theatres and Cinépolis) boycotted the film. Coco was shown in 618 theaters, compared to 919 theaters that showed Sony Pictures' Jumanji: Welcome to the Jungle, which premiered in Brazil at the same time.

On November 22, 2019, the U.S. Department of Justice formally filed its motion for a federal court order to nullify the Paramount Decrees, which was set in place after the 1948 case United States v. Paramount Pictures, Inc. that required movie studios to divest themselves of their theatrical arms, and prohibited certain anti-competitive practices in the distribution business. The department had cited the shifting realities of an industry that has come to rely on online revenue such as streaming services as a justification. David Sims of The Atlantic wrote that such move would be very disruptive to the theater industry.

=== Pay television industry ===
American Cable Association President and CEO Matthew M. Polka lambasted the deal and called on federal regulators to "fully investigate" the merger. He was concerned about his smaller subscription television constituents having to negotiate multichannel deals with a behemoth that combines Fox's regional sports networks with ESPN and its cadre of collegiate-conference-focused RSNs, as well as the majority stake in Hulu:

The Disney-Fox marriage not only will create one of the world's largest entertainment conglomerates but will give the combined company control of critical video programming that can be bundled together to harm consumers in local and national markets. In particular, Disney-Fox will become the largest holder of key local and national sports programming rights. It also will gain control of more national cable programming networks, and a significant stake in Hulu – an increasingly popular online distribution service. These assets will be in addition to Disney's national broadcast network (ABC) and multiple owned and operated ABC television stations. Because the combined company post-transaction could leverage these programming assets to undermine competition to the detriment of consumers, federal agencies must fully investigate the proposed combination to ensure that it neither violates antitrust laws nor is inconsistent with the public interest.

Many European telecommunication companies also expressed concerns about the Disney–Fox deal, considering that Sky plc and Sky UK were included in the package, as it serves almost 23 million households across Britain, Ireland, Germany, Austria, and Italy. Disney's takeover of Sky would be greater than RTL Group, Mediaset, ITV, ProSiebenSat.1 Media, Viasat, and Vivendi combined, according to Eikon estimates, and could allow Sky to expand into new markets and bid more for sports rights and other content. Some felt that a Disney-owned Sky UK would be most damaging to its pay-TV competitors since it has invested in content to cross-sell television with mobile services, in a bid to squeeze more out of customers. A hedge fund with a small stake in Sky has complained that the Disney–Fox deal could cost minority shareholders in the UK satellite broadcaster a hefty premium unless UK regulators intervene.

Dish Network CEO Erik Carlson said blockbuster mergers like the Disney–Fox deal could severely limit the number of content companies providing to their customers. Carlson said on CNBC's Squawk on the Street that "We really take the position that we think about the customer and the customer first."

=== Entertainment industry ===
The Writers Guild of America West, the union that represents writers of films, television, and other media, wrote that:

In the relentless drive to eliminate competition, big business has an insatiable appetite for consolidation. Disney and Fox have spent decades profiting from the oligopolistic control that the six major media conglomerates have exercised over the entertainment industry, often at the expense of the creators who power their television and film operations. Now, this proposed merger of direct competitors will make matters even worse by substantially increasing the market power of a combined Disney-Fox corporation. The antitrust concerns raised by this deal are obvious and significant. The Writers Guild of America West strongly opposes this merger and will work to ensure our nation's antitrust laws are enforced.

Tom Rothman, chairman of the Sony Pictures Entertainment Motion Picture Group and former co-chairman of Fox Filmed Entertainment, said the Disney–Fox deal was a dangerous proposition: "Consolidation under giant corporate mandates rarely promotes creative risk-taking. And in the long run, it is always a challenge to compete against horizontal monopolistic power."

James Mangold, director of Fox's Marvel adaptations The Wolverine and its R-rated sequel Logan, expressed concerns that the deal might lead to the approval of a similar film that may have more limited appeal than a conventional Marvel blockbuster, thereby limiting the opportunities for certain filmmakers as well as the consumers. Mangold said that "If they're actually changing their mandate, if what they're supposed to do alters, that would be sad to me because it just means less movies."

At the Critics' Choice Movie Awards on January 11, 2018, producer J. Miles Dale, who accepted the Critics' Choice Movie Award for Best Picture for The Shape of Water, urged Disney "not to mess" with 20th Century Fox's indie studio Fox Searchlight Pictures, saying, "they're making the kind of movies that we need to make, we want to make, and people need to see."

Writer Marc Guggenheim, known for his work for the Arrowverse for The CW, said that "As a writer, I'm not a big fan of these big corporate consolidations. I don't think they're necessarily good for writers, directors, producers, and actors. I also, as an American, don't love these big corporate mergers. I don't think they're necessarily good for the country."

The potential acquisition of Fox by Disney caused concern within the entertainment industry that smaller media companies, including Viacom, CBS Corporation, Lionsgate, and Metro-Goldwyn-Mayer (MGM), would need to consolidate or be sold in order to remain competitive. Of all these companies, Viacom and CBS Corporation would merge to form ViacomCBS in December 2019 and Metro-Goldwyn-Mayer was acquired by Amazon in May 2021, with the deal being finalized by March 2022.

On February 13, 2018, television producer Ryan Murphy, a long-time collaborator of 20th Century Fox Television, signed a five-year $300 million agreement with Netflix, a move considered to be a big blow to Fox and Disney. Murphy cited the Disney–Fox deal as the main reason for departure, arguing that his freedom under Disney might be severely limited in creating new, risk-taking content.

Jeff Bock of Exhibitor Relations expressed hope that the merger would force creativity in other studios like Paramount, which might focus on smaller-budget films knowing that it could not compete with Walt Disney (after the Fox acquisition) in making big-budget blockbusters.

Viacom CEO Bob Bakish has stated that the Disney–Fox deal provides a "very real opportunity" to hire new executive and creative talent at Paramount and other studios amid the "dislocation associated with change of ownership" at Disney and Fox. Bakish also suggested that Viacom and other companies can provide new content for streaming services such as Netflix once Disney removes their content from the service in 2019.

Walt Disney Studios co-chairman and CEO Alan F. Horn acknowledged that Disney has a stranglehold on the entertainment industry especially after the Fox acquisition, but defended against the monopoly accusations:

We do have an outsized share of the market for sure, that's because people get up, go to the theater, pay their money and watch our movies. I think, for me, I can't apologize for the collective market share we enjoy. I know we enjoy a huge segment of the market share available, but I don't want to apologize for it. I think our films are very different from one another, but it's fair to say, 'Gee whizz, these guys and ladies enjoy a very hefty percentage of the box office.' But that falls outside of my job description, my job is the shepherd the making of these movies as best I can.

Tom Reimann of Collider said that "Horn's bizarre, rambling rationalization veers towards seemingly deliberate obfuscation at several points" by saying that he "point[ed] out that Disney makes a wide variety of films (the two topics are wholly unrelated) while admitting only that Disney enjoys 'a very hefty percentage of the box office' without acknowledging that the studio has bought out most of its meaningful competition."

=== Political reaction ===
President Donald Trump praised both companies for the merger, believing it is best for American jobs. However, U.S. Representative David Cicilline of Rhode Island, the ranking Democrat on the House Antitrust Subcommittee, expressed concerns over the transaction. He said in a statement that "Disney's proposed purchase of 21st Century Fox threatens to put control of even more television, movie, and news content into the hands of a single media giant. If it's approved, this acquisition could allow Disney to limit what consumers can watch and increase their cable bills," he said. "Disney will gain more than 300 channels, 22 regional sports networks, control over Hulu, and a significant portion of Roku."

=== Other comments ===
Richard Greenfield, a BTIG Research analyst, wrote that the combined Disney and Fox assets would have a 39% theatrical market share:

Disney is already using its box office muscle to bully movie domestic exhibitors, extracting financial terms far beyond their studio peers... Adding Fox, which controls portions of the Marvel universe (X-Men, Deadpool) and the Avatar franchise, would enable Disney to gain unprecedented market power.

In response to the Disney–Fox deal, analyst Andy Hargreaves of KeyBanc Capital Markets Inc. downgraded Fox's stock from overweight to Sector Weight with no assigned price target. Hargreaves said that although the merger is positive for both companies, it comes with a high antitrust risk due to Disney's potential share of theatrical revenue, its share of domestic cable assets, its strong position in sports, and its power to already force preferential deals with cable, satellite, and theater owners.

David Balto, an antitrust lawyer and former policy director at the FTC, said that the inclusion of regional sports networks would give Disney greater leverage with cable and satellite distributors: "Any increase in Disney sports programming will be extremely problematic and will get intense scrutiny".

John Simpson of the activist group Consumer Watchdog said that the deal "would give far too much monopolistic power to Disney, which is known for cutthroat, hardball tactics", and "can only mean higher prices and less choice for consumers."

Barton Crockett, a media analyst at B. Riley FBR, said that "Disney is becoming the Wal-Mart of Hollywood: huge and dominant. That's going to have a big influence up and down the supply chain."

Ian Bezek, contributor to InvestorPlace, questioned the underlying rationale for the merger, asking why Disney needed to acquire Fox's film production and cable sports business (which they were eventually forced to sell) for such a "high price", given Disney's already healthy positions in both businesses:

Put another way, Disney is paying $66 billion, including the assumption of $13 billion in debt, to add more sports channels and film production to its already powerful place in both areas. Given the problems at ESPN, some would say this is doubling down on a struggling division. In any case, this deal significantly weakens the argument that Disney is a diversified powerhouse, as it will rely much more on just a couple revenue streams for the majority of its profits post-deal.

Jonathan Barnett, law professor at the University of Southern California Gould School of Law states that when considering streaming services under the same markets as theaters, worries about Disney's control "would be substantially diminished".

Matt Stoller, in his article for Pro-Market website, argued that:

Disney is not a corporation that pushes the bounds of artistic and technological possibility but a corporation that pushes the bounds of legal possibility under a radical pro-consolidation framework that has existed since the 1990s. Its new streaming service Disney Plus proves that the company is willing to lose money in order to generate market power that Disney can later use, often against consumers.

== See also ==
- Merger of AOL and Time Warner (2001)
- Acquisition of NBC Universal by Comcast (2011)
- Acquisition of Time Warner by AT&T (2018)
- 2019 merger of CBS and Viacom (2019)
- Merger of Discovery, Inc. and WarnerMedia (2022)
- Merger of Skydance Media and Paramount Global (2025)
- Acquisition of Warner Bros. Discovery by Paramount Skydance (2026)
- Concentration of media ownership
- List of largest media and entertainment mergers and acquisitions
