= Proxy statement =

Information published related to shareholder meetings

A proxy statement is a statement provided by a firm soliciting shareholder votes. This statement is useful in assessing how management is paid and potential conflict of interest issues with auditors.

The statement includes voting procedure and information, background information about the company's nominated directors, board compensation, executive compensation, and audit fees and committee members. Regulation may govern the requirements of proxy statements.

== Contents ==
The statement includes:

- Voting procedure and information.
- Background information about the company's nominated directors including relevant history in the company or industry, positions on other corporate boards, and potential conflicts of interest.
- Board compensation.
- Executive compensation, including salary, bonus, non-equity compensation, stock awards, options, and deferred compensation. Also, information is included about perks such as personal use of company aircraft, travel, and tax gross-ups. Many companies will also include pre-determined payout packages for if an executive leaves the company.
- Who is on the audit committee, as well as a breakdown of audit and non-audit fees paid to the auditor.

== Regulation ==
=== US regulation ===
In the US, Regulation 14A is the set of rules around proxy solicitations and Schedule 14A sets rules for the proxy statement. A proxy statement is required of a firm when soliciting shareholder votes. This statement is filed in advance of the annual meeting. The firm needs to file a proxy statement—otherwise known as a Form DEF 14A (Definitive Proxy Statement)—with the U.S. Securities and Exchange Commission. Per SEC proxy rules, the term proxy statement means the statement required by Section 240.14a-3(a) whether or not contained in a single document.

==== Proxy access ====
The Securities Exchange Act of 1934 also gave the SEC the power to regulate the solicitation of proxies, though some of the rules the SEC has since proposed (like the universal proxy) have been controversial. There has been some controversy over "proxy access" which is a method to allow certain shareholders to nominate candidates which appear on the proxy statement. Historically, only the nominating board can place candidates on the proxy statement. Activist investors typically had mailed their own ballots when running competing candidates. The United States Dodd–Frank Wall Street Reform and Consumer Protection Act specifically allowed the SEC to rule on this issue. In 2010, the SEC passed a rule which allowed certain shareholders to place candidates on the proxy statement; however, in Business Roundtable v. SEC the rule was struck down by the United States Court of Appeals for the District of Columbia Circuit in 2011.

Beginning in 2015, proxy access rules began to spread driven by initiatives from major institutional investors, and as of 2018, 71% of S&P 500 companies had a proxy access rule.

== Voting process ==
=== Proxy advisory ===
In many cases, shareholder votes—particularly institutional shareholder votes—are determined by proxy firms which advise the shareholders. In July 2010, the SEC announced that it was seeking public comment on the efficiency of the proxy system. Voting is important for corporate governance, but many of the votes are cast by institutional shareholders, including many who are passive investors. These organizations use proxy advisory firms, notably including Institutional Shareholder Services and Glass Lewis, to help them vote their shares in a responsible way.

=== Broker voting ===
Traditionally, broker-dealers have been permitted to vote for "routine" proposals on behalf of their shareholders if the shareholders do not return the proxy statement, and this practice has been controversial. In 2006 the NYSE Proxy Working Group recommended that the rules, e.g. Rule 452, be modified so that uncontested director elections were not considered routine and the SEC approved the rule on July 1, 2009. Broker voting is, for the most part, governed by Rule 452.

=== Universal proxy ballots ===
In contested elections for the board of directors, shareholders typically have to vote using either the management form ("card") listing management candidates or separately listing the contesting candidates in a dissident form. In 2016, the SEC proposed a rule requiring a "universal" proxy card so that shareholders could vote on a mix of candidates, which as of 2019 had not passed.

=== Electronic voting ===
Prior to 2009, companies in the United States were required to send proxy materials via postal mail, but following a rule change effective in 2009, companies, can handle voting electronically. According to one study, about 31% of voting happened electronically in 2019. One major vendor, Computershare, reported that 27% of votes occurred on the web in 2017. Broadridge is another major vendor.

== Retail investors ==
When retail investors own stock via investment funds such as mutual funds, the investor cannot vote the shares as the investment manager has that power. According to one estimate, retail investors voted 46% of the time between 2011 and 2016. According to a 2013 estimate, between 23 and 38% of stocks are held directly, compared to 20% held by mutual funds and 16% held by pensions.

== See also ==
- Proxy fight
- Proxy voting
