= IIAS =

IIAS could refer to

- International Institute for Asian Studies
- International Institute of Administrative Sciences
- Indian Institute of Advanced Study
- Indonesia International Auto Show
- Inventory information approval system
- International Institute for Advanced Studies in Systems Research and Cybernetics
- Institutional Investor Advisory Services
- Israel Institute for Advanced Studies
