= Proxy Governance, Inc. =

Proxy Governance, Inc., was one of four prominent independent proxy advisory services (proxy firm) in the United States. (The others are Glass Lewis & Co., Egan-Jones Proxy Services and Institutional Shareholder Services, Inc.) As such, it provided proxy voting recommendations on U.S. and non-U.S. publicly reporting companies. Additionally, it provided an online voting platform that permits clients to vote their shares.

The company was often quoted in the media when they issue recommendations to shareholders during high-profile proxy fights, and in cases involving proposed mergers and acquisitions.

== Demise ==
In February 2011, PGI was acquired by Ernst & Young. Prior to the acquisition, the firm had transferred their client base to Glass Lewis, and ceased operations.
