= 3300 =

3300 or variant, may refer to:

== In general ==
- A.D. 3300, a year in the 4th millennium CE
- 3300 BC, a year in the 4th millennium BCE
- 3300, a number in the 3000 (number) range

== Products ==
- International 3300, a bus model usually used as a school bus

=== Electronics ===
- CDC 3300, a mainframe computer in the CDC 3000 series
- Datapoint 3300, one of the first computer terminals
- Nokia 3300, a cellphone
- Wang 3300, a minicomputer from Wang Laboratories

=== Motor Engines ===
- CAMit 3300, an aero engine
- GM 3300 engine, an automotive engine
- Jabiru 3300, an aero engine

=== Rail ===
- GWR 3300 Class steam locomotive class
- Keisei 3300 series electric multiple unit train class
- Meitetsu 3300 series electric multiple unit train class
- NS 3300 steam locomotive class
- Queensland Railways 3300 class electric locomotive class

== Other uses ==
- 3300 McGlasson, an asteroid in the Asteroid Belt, the 3300th asteroid registered
- 3300 (District of Gramsh), one of the postal codes in Albania

== See also ==
- USS Western Light (ID-3300), a WWI U.S. Navy cargo ship
