= Steven Wallman =

Commissioner of the United States Securities ad Exchange Commission

Steven Wallman is the former commissioner of the U.S. Securities and Exchange Commission (SEC). Wallman held this position from 1994 to 1997. He has also founded several companies, including Folio Financial, Inc. and Proxy Governance, Inc.

== Biography ==
Steven Wallman was sworn in as a commissioner of the SEC on July 5, 1994, having been appointed by Bill Clinton. Wallman previously was a partner at law firm Covington & Burling. Wallman received a J.D. from Columbia University and a B.S. and M.S. from MIT.

In his time with the SEC, he fought for the "decimalization" of stock prices (i.e., using decimals instead of the then-standard fractions, e.g., $10.25 instead of $10¼) on the New York Stock Exchange, NASDAQ, and AMEX. After much testing and various pilot programs, the first day of decimalized stock prices took place on March 26, 2001.

Wallman is the founder of several companies, including Folio Financial, Inc. (acquired in 2020 by Goldman Sachs) and Proxy Governance, Inc.

In late September 2008, Wallman published a commentary in the San Francisco Chronicle to help solve the credit crisis without a bailout by using taxpayer-provided funds to make money available to homeowners who live in their homes (and not speculators) to stabilize housing.

Wallman's plan is to provide financial institutions a government guarantee in lieu of any penalties or foreclosure to homeowners that have a mortgage in distress the current or missed payments under the mortgage. When a borrower agrees to have the government take over the mortgage payments, the mortgage company notify the government, then the government to make the payments, and the borrower would sign a note agreeing to repay the government with interest at the same rate currently required under the borrower's mortgage.

In late September 2008, FOLIOfn released a media advisory that Wallman is available to comment on the proposed Proposed bailout of United States financial system.

Wallman currently serves on FINRA's FinTech Industry Committee.
