= PIRC =

PIRC may refer to:

- Vasja Pirc, chess grandmaster
- Parental Information and Resource Centers, a program in the U.S. Department of Education
- Pensions & Investments Research Consultants, a proxy advisor in the UK
- Pittsburgh International Race Complex, a race track in Wampum, Pennsylvania
- Police Investigations and Review Commissioner, a public body of the Scottish Government

== See also ==
- Pirc Defence, a chess opening starting with the moves 1. e4 d6
