= Amtran =

Amtran may refer to:

- AmTran, a manufacturer of school buses
- The former holding company (and radio callsign) of ATA Airlines
- Altoona Metro Transit
