= 1954 in rail transport =

This article lists events related to rail transport that occurred in 1954.

== Events ==
=== January ===
- January 3 – The last steam locomotive powered passenger train departs Washington Union Station; Richmond, Fredericksburg and Potomac Railroad engine number 622 Carter Braxton pulls the train, leaving at approximately 1:40 PM bound for Richmond, Virginia.
- January 8 – Southern Pacific Railroad's Sunset Limited becomes the first train to use the new New Orleans Union Passenger Terminal.

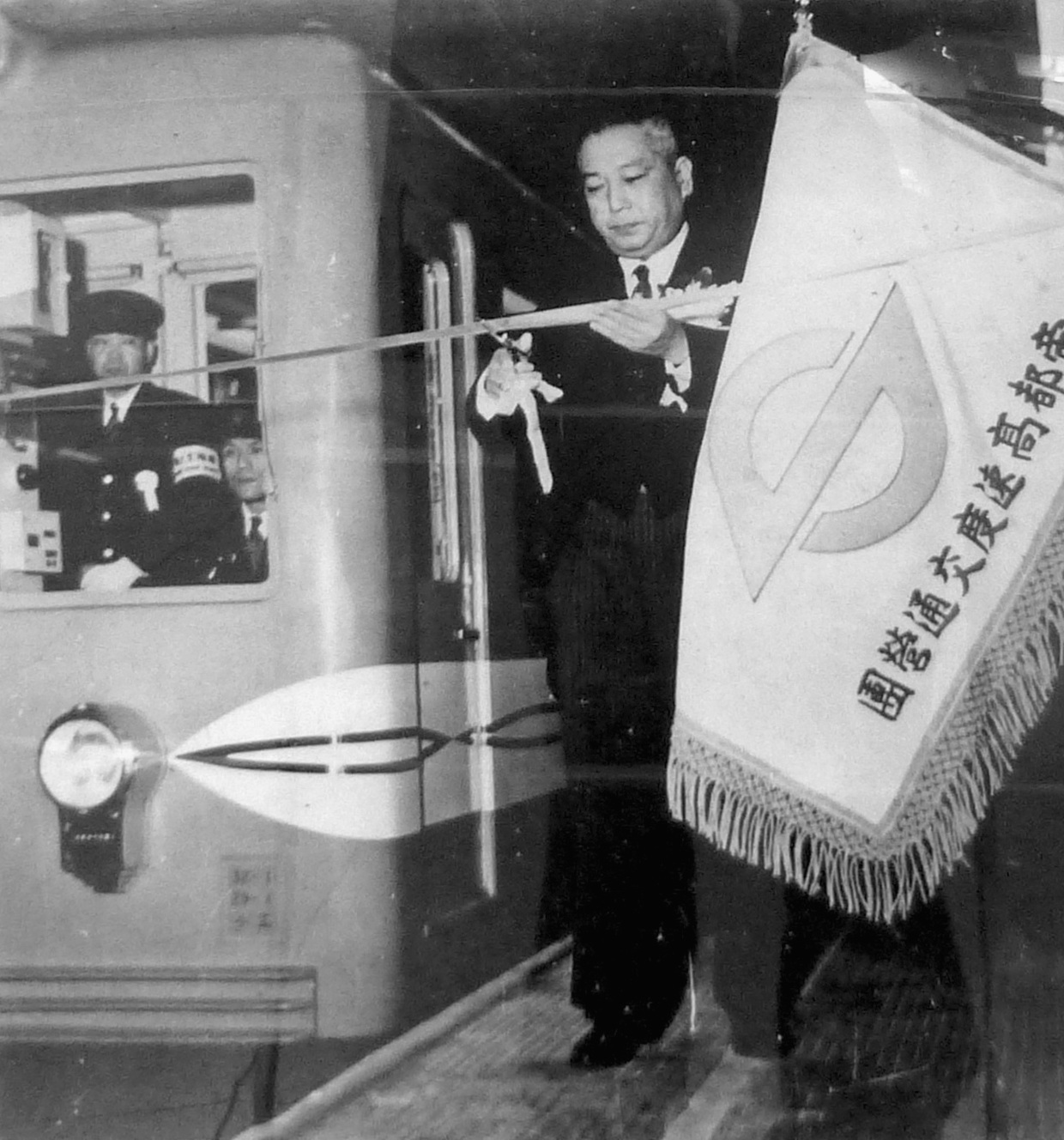
Part of the opening ceremony for the Marunouchi Line at Ikebukuro Station.

- January 20 – The Tokyo Metro Marunouchi Line, the second line in the system and the first built after World War II, is opened between Ikebukuro and Ochanomizu stations.
- January 24 – Cleveland, Ohio, streetcars make their last revenue run.
- January – General Motors Electro-Motive Division introduces the EMD F9 and GP9.

=== February ===
- February 21 – An SNCF electric train hits 151 mph (243 km/h) in tests, setting a world’s record.
- February – General Motors Electro-Motive Division introduces the EMD FP9.

=== March ===
- March 30 – Yonge subway, the first segment of the Toronto subway and the first underground rapid transit line in Canada, begins operation.

=== April ===
- April 20 – The Chicago, Milwaukee, St. Paul and Pacific Railroad ("Milwaukee Road") opens a new station in Tacoma, Washington.
- April 30 – Last day of steam locomotive operations and passenger train service on the Clinchfield Railroad.

=== May ===
- May – General Motors Electro-Motive Division introduces the EMD E9.

=== June ===
- June 6 – The Atchison, Topeka and Santa Fe Railway introduces the San Francisco Chief passenger train between Chicago and San Francisco.
- June 13 – Last day of steam locomotive operation on the Maine Central Railroad.
- June 14 – New York Central management loses a proxy fight for control of the railroad to Robert Ralph Young and his Alleghany Corporation.
- June – General Electric delivers the first diesel-electric locomotives built for the narrow gauge White Pass and Yukon Route.

=== July ===
- July 2 – SNCF electrifies first section of Valenciennes–Thionville line, the first non-experimental 25 kV AC railway electrification.
- July 4 – Budd delivers the first Château series car, Château Bienville, to Canadian Pacific Railway in Montreal.
- July – New Zealand Railways Department introduces DF class (built by English Electric) into service, the country's first mainline diesel-electric locomotives.

=== August ===
- August 7 – The last streetcars operate on the Altoona and Logan Valley Electric Railway in Altoona, Pennsylvania.

=== October ===
- October 16 – The Southern Pacific dieselized its 3 foot (914 mm) gauge Keeler branch.
- October 20 – To commemorate the 100th Anniversary of Horseshoe Curve, the Sylvania Electric Products Corporation sponsors a night photograph of the Curve using more than 6500 flashbulbs.

=== November ===
- November 29 – The first dome cars built by Budd Company enter revenue service on Spokane, Portland and Seattle Railway's North Coast Limited.

=== December ===
- December – Louisville and Nashville Railroad and Nashville, Chattanooga and St. Louis Railway open the new Radnor Yard in Nashville, Tennessee.
- December – Pullman-Standard builds the first bilevel commuter coaches for the Southern Pacific Railroad to use in the south San Francisco Bay Area.
- December – The last steam locomotive on the Southern Railway (U.S.) is retired from standby service.

=== Unknown date ===
- Circular Koltsevaya Line of the Moscow Metro completed.
- American Car and Foundry officially changes its name to ACF Industries, Inc.
- Atchison, Topeka and Santa Fe Railway divests itself of the Grand Canyon Hotel and other buildings at the north end of the Grand Canyon Railway.
- Netherlands Railway Museum moves to the former Maliebaan station.

== Deaths ==
=== January deaths ===
- January 5 – Death Valley Scotty (born Walter Edward Scott; pictured), con man who chartered the Scott Special record-breaking run on the Atchison, Topeka and Santa Fe Railway in 1905, dies (born 1872).

=== December deaths ===
- December 15 – Ernest Lemon, Chief Mechanical Engineer (1931–1932) and later Vice President of the London, Midland and Scottish Railway (born 1884).
