= Underweight (stock market) =

Term used within the stock market

In financial markets, underweight is a term used when rating stock by a financial analyst. A rating system may be three-tiered: "overweight," equal weight, and underweight, or five-tiered: buy, overweight, hold, underweight, and sell. Also used are outperform, neutral, underperform, and buy, accumulate, hold, reduce, and sell.

If a stock is deemed underweight, the analyst is saying they consider the investor should reduce their holding, so that it should "weigh" less within the investment portfolio. For example, if an investor has 10% of their stocks in Retail, 25% in Manufacturing, 50% in Hi-Tech, and 15% in Defense, and the broker says that Retail is "underweight," then they are implying a smaller percentage of the stocks should be in Retail. The stock's total return is expected to be below the average total return of the analyst's industry (or industry team's) coverage universe, on a risk-adjusted basis, over the next 12-18 months.

== See also ==
- Securities research
- Overweight (stock market)
- Buy and hold
