= Securities research =

Discipline within the financial services industry

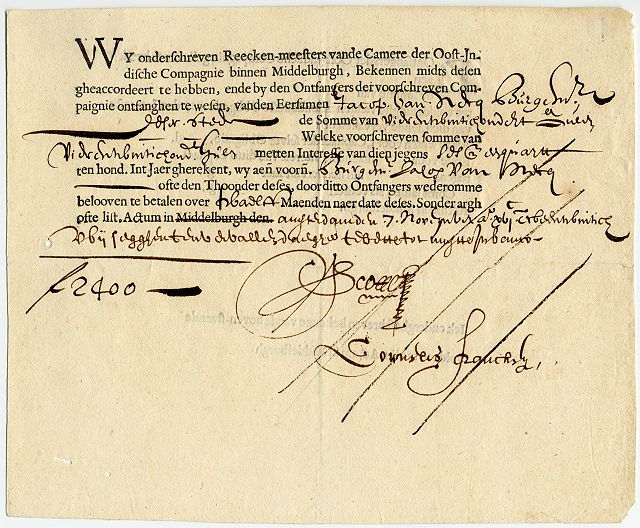
An example of a bond.

Investment banks

- Atlantic Equities
- Baird
- Bank of America Securities
- Barclays
- BMO Capital Markets
- BNP Paribas
- Cantor Fitzgerald
- Citigroup
- CLSA
- Cowen, Inc.
- Credit Suisse
- Daiwa Securities Group
- Deutsche Bank
- Evercore Partners
- Fundamental Research
- Goldman Sachs
- Haitong International
- HSBC
- Jefferies Financial Group
- JPMorgan Chase
- Lazard
- Loop Capital
- Macquarie Group
- Mizuho Securities
- Morgan Stanley
- Needham
- Nomura Holdings
- Piper Sandler
- Raymond James
- RBC Capital Markets
- SMBC Nikko Securities
- Tigress
- UBS
- Wells Fargo

Independent

- Argus Research Company (premier independent investment research firm)
- Bloomberg (independent institutional global research firm)
- Monness & Crespi
- Morningstar, Inc. (independent institutional global research firm)
- Standard & Poor's, which provides its reports through some discount brokerages (e.g. TD Ameritrade)
- The Motley Fool, which provides private financial and investing advice
- Zacks Investment Research

Securities research is a discipline within the financial services industry about securities. Securities research professionals are known most generally as "analysts", "research analysts", or "securities analysts"; all the foregoing terms are synonymous. Research analysts produce research reports and typically issue a recommendation: buy ("overweight"), hold, or sell ("underweight"); see target price and trade idea.

These reports can be accessed from a number of sources, and brokerages will often offer the reports free to their customers. Research can be categorized by the security type, as well as by whether it is buy-side research or sell-side research; analysts further focus on particular industries. Although usually associated with fundamental analysis, research also focuses on technical analysis, and reports will often include both. See also Financial analyst § Securities firms.

== Analyst specialization ==
Securities analysts are commonly divided between the two basic kinds of securities: equity analysts (researching stocks and their issuers) and fixed income analysts (researching bond issuers); there are various other financial instruments. There are some analysts who cover all of the securities of a particular issuer, stocks and bonds alike.

Securities analysts are usually further subdivided by industry specialization (or sectors)—among the industries with the most analyst coverage are biotechnology, financial services, energy, and computer hardware, software and services. Analysts will regularly attend quarterly earnings conference calls; see also earnings guidance.

Fixed-income analysts are also often subdivided by asset class—among the fixed income asset classes with the most analyst coverage are convertible bonds, high yield bonds (see high-yield debt), and distressed bonds (see distressed securities). Although technically not securities, syndicated bank loans typically fall within the domain of fixed income analysts, and are covered, as if they were bonds, by reference to the industry of their borrowers or asset class in which their credit quality would place them. See Corporate bond § Risk analysis.

Research can be further categorized as buy-side research or sell-side research. Sell-side research is conducted by sell-side analysts at investment banks and independent equity research boutiques, and is sold to buy-side investors. Buy-side research, however, is usually not published as it is created for internal use at an asset manager or hedge fund. Sell-side research is offered as part of a broad set of financial services including broking and corporate finance.

New regulation in Europe, Markets in Financial Instruments Directive II (MiFID II), is set to change how research is bought. Research must be "unbundled" from execution costs and priced by the research provider. It has typically been accessed by institutional investors through Thomson Reuters subscription services or Bloomberg terminals but marketplaces like Research Exchange Ltd have emerged where individual research reports or subscriptions can be purchased.

Independent equity research has largely sprung into existence as a result of scandals such as Enron, Lernout & Hauspie and Worldcom where investment banks wrote positive research despite deteriorating fundamentals or fraudulent management. Credit rating agencies such as Moody's, Fitch, and S&P provide a similar service for bond securities. There are also a few retail investor firms such as Morningstar, SEENSCO, Value Line, Zacks Investment Research and AC Investment Research.

== Regulations ==
=== Qualifications ===
Qualifications for investment professionals vary by country, with many countries having specific examination boards which handle certification. A notable certification is the CFA.

==== In the United States ====
In the US, as of 2002, investment professionals seeking to become sell-side equity research analysts must pass the Research Analyst examination administered by FINRA. The exam is divided into two parts: 86 and 87. The Series 86 Research Analyst exam is the Quantitative portion consisting of material from introductory economics and financial accounting. The Series 87 Research Analyst exam is the Regulatory portion consisting of material from the Securities Act of 1933, Securities Exchange Act of 1934, NASD and NYSE Rules. Prior to the update to the FINRA licensing exams in 2018, the Series 7 examination/license was a pre-requisite for the Research Analyst exams. Now, candidates must pass the Securities Industry Essentials exam before taking the Series 86 and 87. The Series 7 Top-Off and Series 63 exams are sometimes required at the state-level for research analysts. Successful completion of the CFA level I & II exams provides a waiver for the Series 86 exam, but not the Series 87 examination.

==== In Hong Kong ====
In Hong Kong, investment professionals must pass the Paper 1 administered by the Hong Kong Securities Institute. Passing this exam allows the individual to receive the Type 4 license to be a publishing research analyst in Hong Kong.

=== Industry rules ===
Buy-side and independent research are generally unregulated. Sell-side research is subject to regulation by the securities authorities of the locales where it is performed. The large majority of all sell-side research is performed either in the United Kingdom or the United States. UK sell-side research is regulated by the Financial Services Authority. US sell-side research has a more complex regime of regulation. The U.S. Securities and Exchange Commission has prescribed certain relevant rules (among them Regulation AC and Regulation FD) but has generally delegated research regulation to the self-regulatory organizations. The principal SROs (the National Association of Securities Dealers and the New York Stock Exchange) have issued detailed regulations of equity research, and much more cursory regulation of fixed income research. (With respect to the latter, the NYSE and the NASD have re-delegated the substance of regulation to the broker-dealer trade group Securities Industry and Financial Markets Association as the merger successor of the Bond Market Association, to whom the role was originally assigned.) The impact upon securities research regulation of the pending merger of the NASD with the regulatory arm of the NYSE is currently uncertain.

In the immediate aftermath of the excesses of the 1990s referred to above, Eliot Spitzer, Governor of the State of New York, asserted a significant role in policing securities research performed by New York-based analysts; it is unclear whether oversight by the New York State Attorney General will become a long-term meaningful component of securities research. The going-forward conduct provisions of a master settlement agreement between (on the one hand) most of the aforesaid U.S. regulators and (on the other hand) many of the largest U.S. broker-dealers, is an important source of ongoing regulation, with the force of law for the broker-dealers who are party to it, and a strong, if not formally legally binding effect, on broker-dealers not party to it.

The latest rule changes are coming into effect in Europe under MiFID II. Research has been deemed an inducement to trade and must be "unbundled" from execution costs. The new rules around Research Unbundling are viewed as a major challenge by asset managers as they materially alter the way in which research has been consumed. Research budgets must be set in advance, payments for research separated from execution, the quality of research regularly assessed, and auditable records of consumption and payments kept. New platforms launched in anticipation of the rules coming into effect. At the same time, accelerator-type initiatives like Boost Research are being created to help independent analysts set up their own businesses for providing independent research and analysis.

== See also ==
- Active management
- Discretionary investment management
- Earnings call
- Earnings guidance
- Earnings management
- Financial analyst § Securities firms
- Financial risk management § Investment management
- Financial roadshows
- Grossman-Stiglitz Paradox
- Investor relations
- Investment banking § Research
- Material non-public information
- Mosaic theory
- Neglected firm effect
- Preannouncement § Corporate Earnings
- Target price
- Trade idea
