= Hokuso 7260 series =

Japanese train type

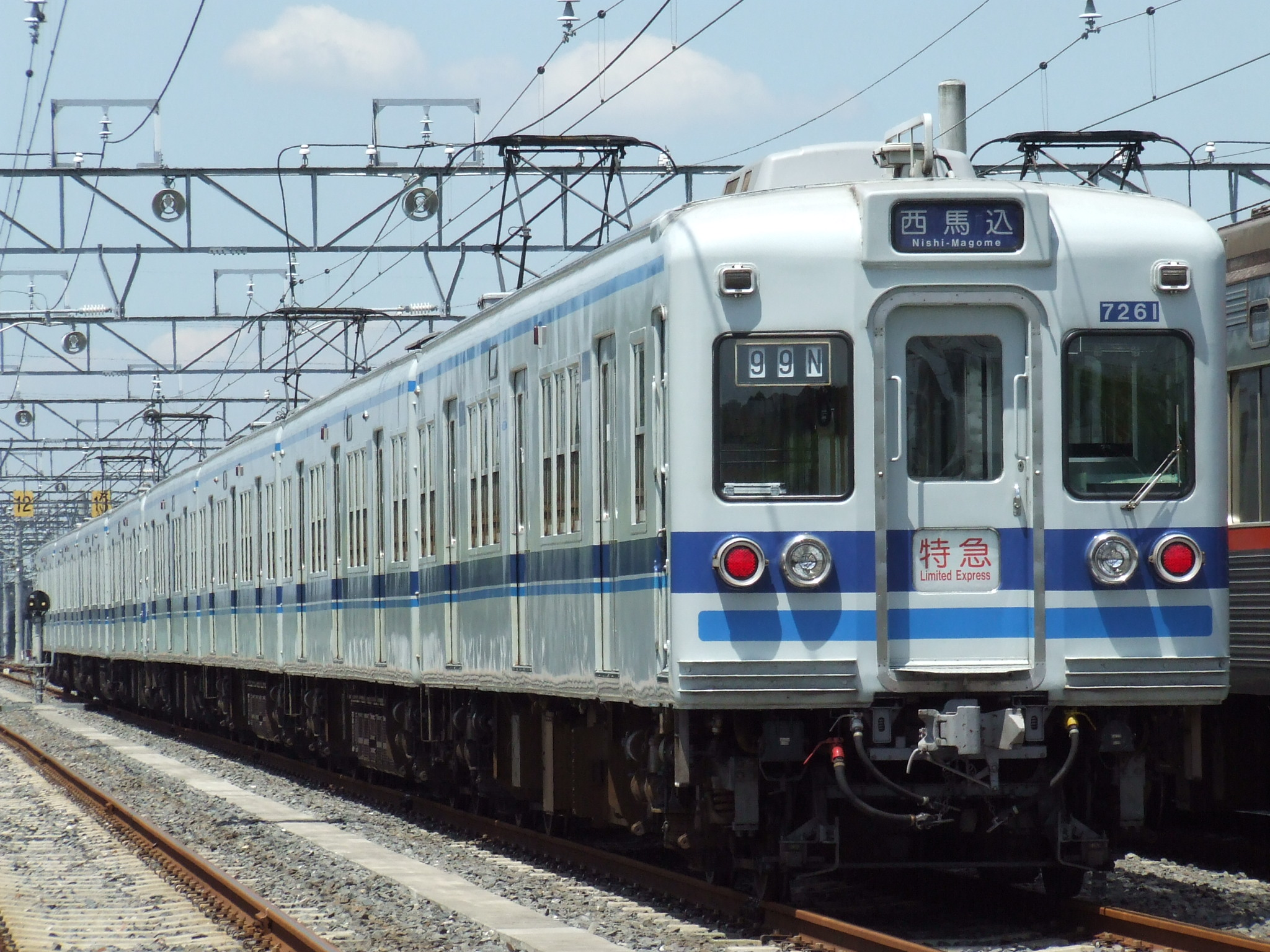
- 7260 series set 7261 in August 2007
- In service: March 2006 - March 2015
- Number built: 8 vehicles (1 set)
- Number scrapped: 8 vehicles (1 set)
- Formation: 8 cars per trainset
- Fleet numbers: 7261
- Operator: Hokuso Railway
- Depot: Inba
- Lines served: Hokuso Line, Keisei Main Line, Toei Asakusa Line, Keikyu Main Line

Specifications
- Car body construction: Steel
- Car length: 18 m (59 ft 1 in)
- Doors: 3 pairs per side
- Electric system: 1,500 V DC
- Current collection: Overhead catenary
- Track gauge: 1,435 mm (4 ft 8 1/2 in)

The Hokuso 7260 series (北総鉄道7260形) was a commuter electric multiple unit (EMU) train type owned and operated by the third-sector railway company Hokuso Railway on the Hokuso Line in Japan from March 2006 until March 2015. The single eight-car train was formed from two former Keisei 3300 series four-car EMU sets leased from Keisei Electric Railway.

== Formation ==
The fleet consisted of a single eight-car set formed of two permanently coupled four-car sets as shown below, with all cars motored, and car 1 at the southern end.

Car No.	1	2	3	4	5	6	7	8
Designation	M2	M1'		M2	M2	M1'		M2
Numbering	7268	7267	7266	7265	7264	7263	7262	7261

The "M1" cars each had one lozenge-type pantograph.

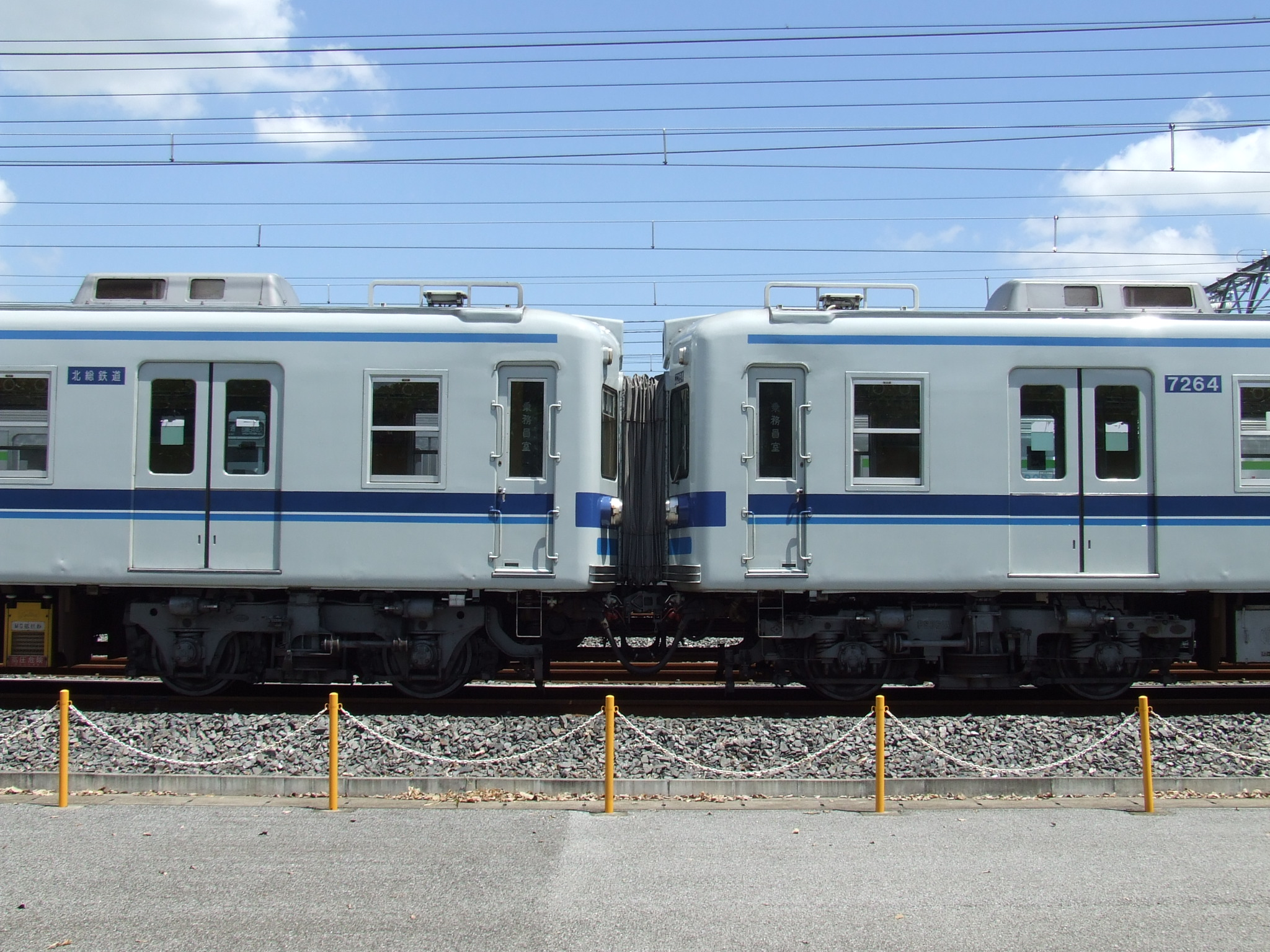
The permanently coupled inner cab ends on cars 7265 and 7264

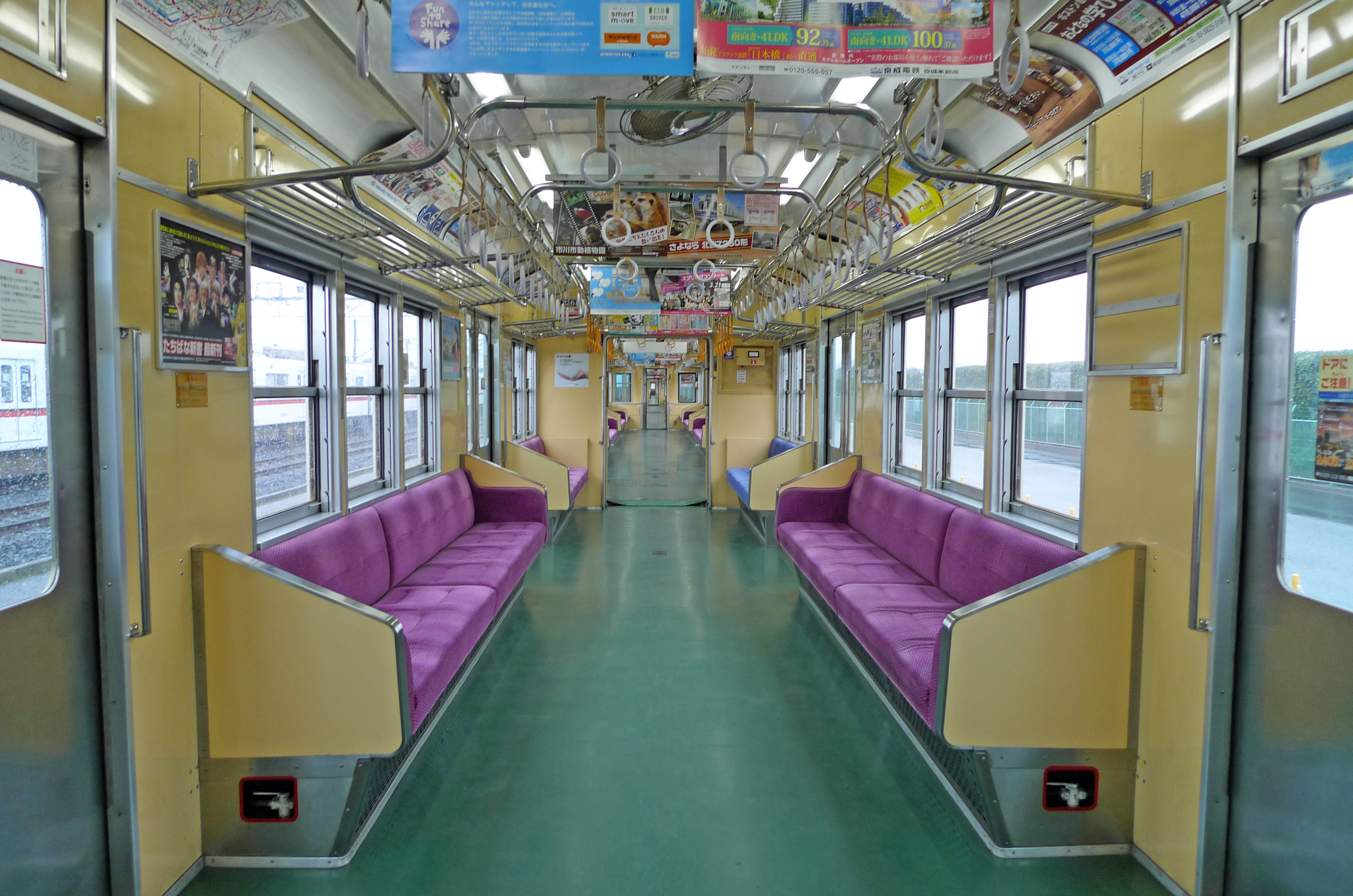
The interior of car 7266 in March 2015

== History ==
Formed of two former Keisei 3300 series four-car sets, the 7260 series trainset entered service on the Hokuso Railway in March 2006.

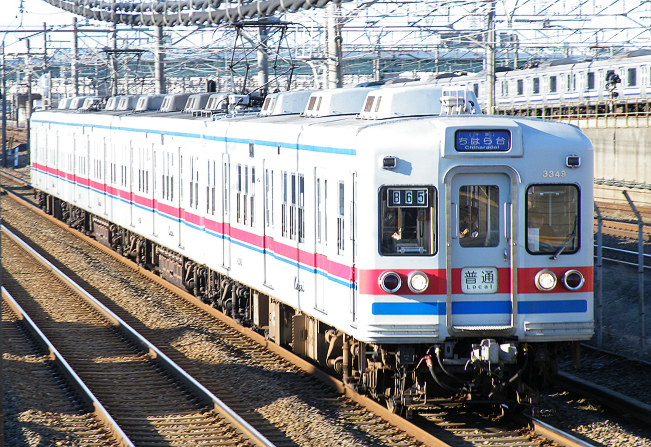
A Keisei 3300 series 4-car EMU

== Withdrawal ==
The 7260 series trainset was withdrawn following its final day in revenue service on 22 March 2015.
