= NS 3300 =

Dutch railways steam locomotive

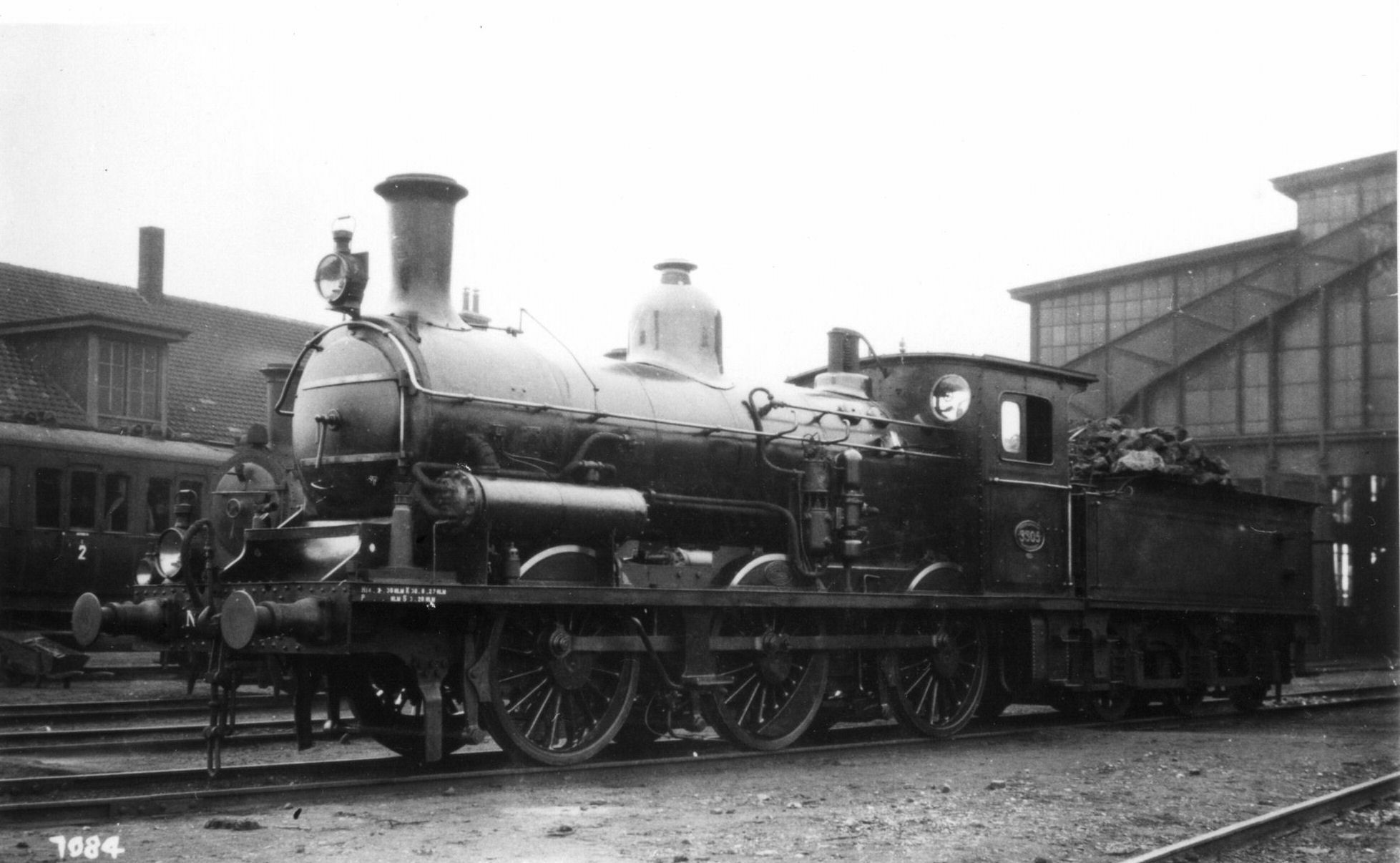
- NS 3305 in Roosendaal. (April 1930)
Type and origin
- Power type: Steam
- Builder: Werkspoor
- Build date: 1912 - 1915
- Total produced: 15
Specifications
- Configuration
  - Whyte: 0-6-0
  - UIC: C 2G
- Gauge: 1,435 mm (4 ft 8 1/2 in)
- Driver dia.: 1,520 mm (5 ft 0 in)
- Tender wheels: 1,105 mm (3 ft 7.5 in)
- Length: 16,343 mm (53 ft 7.4 in)
- Height: 4,365 mm (14 ft 3.9 in)
- Loco weight: 48.4 t (53.4 short tons; 47.6 long tons)
- Tender weight: 32.5 t (35.8 short tons; 32.0 long tons)
- Fuel type: Coal
- Fuel capacity: 3 t (3.3 short tons; 3.0 long tons)
- Water cap.: 12.7 m^{3} (2,800 imp gal)
- Firebox
  - Grate area: 2.04 m^{2} (22.0 sq ft)
- Boiler pressure: 10.5 bar (152 psi)
- Heating surface
  - Firebox: 10 m^{2} (110 sq ft)
  - Tubes: 66 m^{2} (710 sq ft)
- Superheater
  - Heating area: 23 m^{2} (250 sq ft)
- Cylinders: 2
- Cylinder size: 500 mm × 610 mm (20 in × 24 in)
- Valve gear: Stephenson
- Loco brake: Air brake
Performance figures
- Maximum speed: 75 km/h (47 mph)
- Tractive effort: 72.28 kN (16,250 lbf)
Career
- Operators: HSM, NS
- Power class: HSM: GV^{1} NS: GO^{1}
- Withdrawn: 1947 - 1954
- Disposition: All scrapped

The NS 3300 was a series of goods steam locomotives of the Dutch Railways (NS) and its predecessor Hollandsche IJzeren Spoorweg-Maatschappij (HSM).

After the success of the goods locomotives HSM 601-647 with their three coupled axles from 1895-1907, the HSM ordered fifteen similar goods locomotives from Werkspoor, but with superheaters. These were delivered in 1912 (HSM 671-675), 1914 (HSM 676-680) and 1915 (HSM 681-685). The locomotives performed excellently.

When the fleet of the HSM and the SS was merged in 1921, the locomotives of this series were given the NS numbers 3301-3315. During the Second World War, the 3311 was taken to Germany and did not return after that. In 1950 this locomotive was administratively removed. The rest were taken out of service between 1947 and 1954 and designated for scrapping up to and including 1954.

Builder	Lot No.	Date	HSM number	NS number	Withdrawn	Notes
Werkspoor	300-304	1912	671-675	3301-3305	1951-1954	
Werkspoor	342-346	1914	676-680	3306-3310	1947-1954	
Werkspoor	367-371	1915	681-685	3311-3315	1949-1952	

== Gallery ==
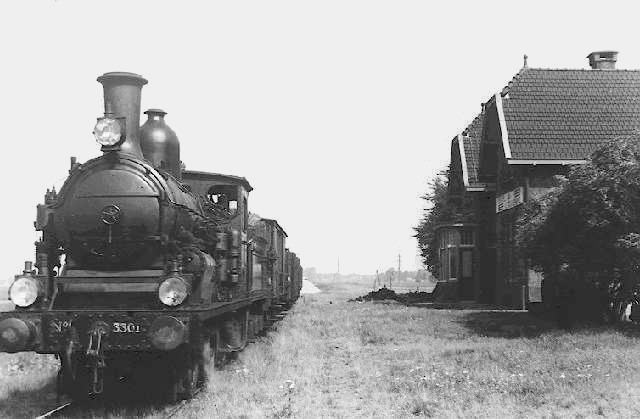
Ter Apelkanaal-Vetstukkenmond station. (1950)

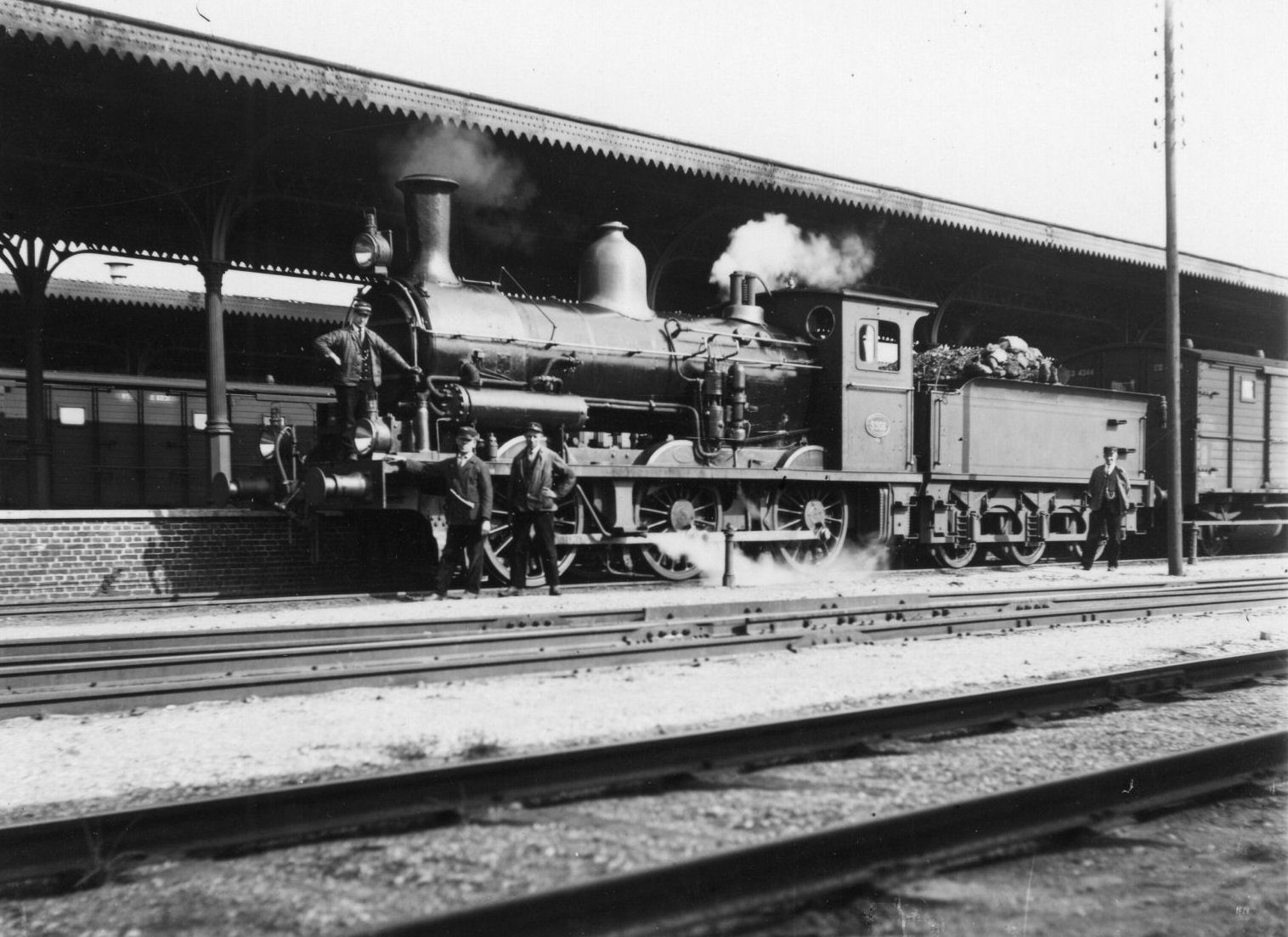
NS 3301 besides the platform of Vlissingen station. (August 1931)

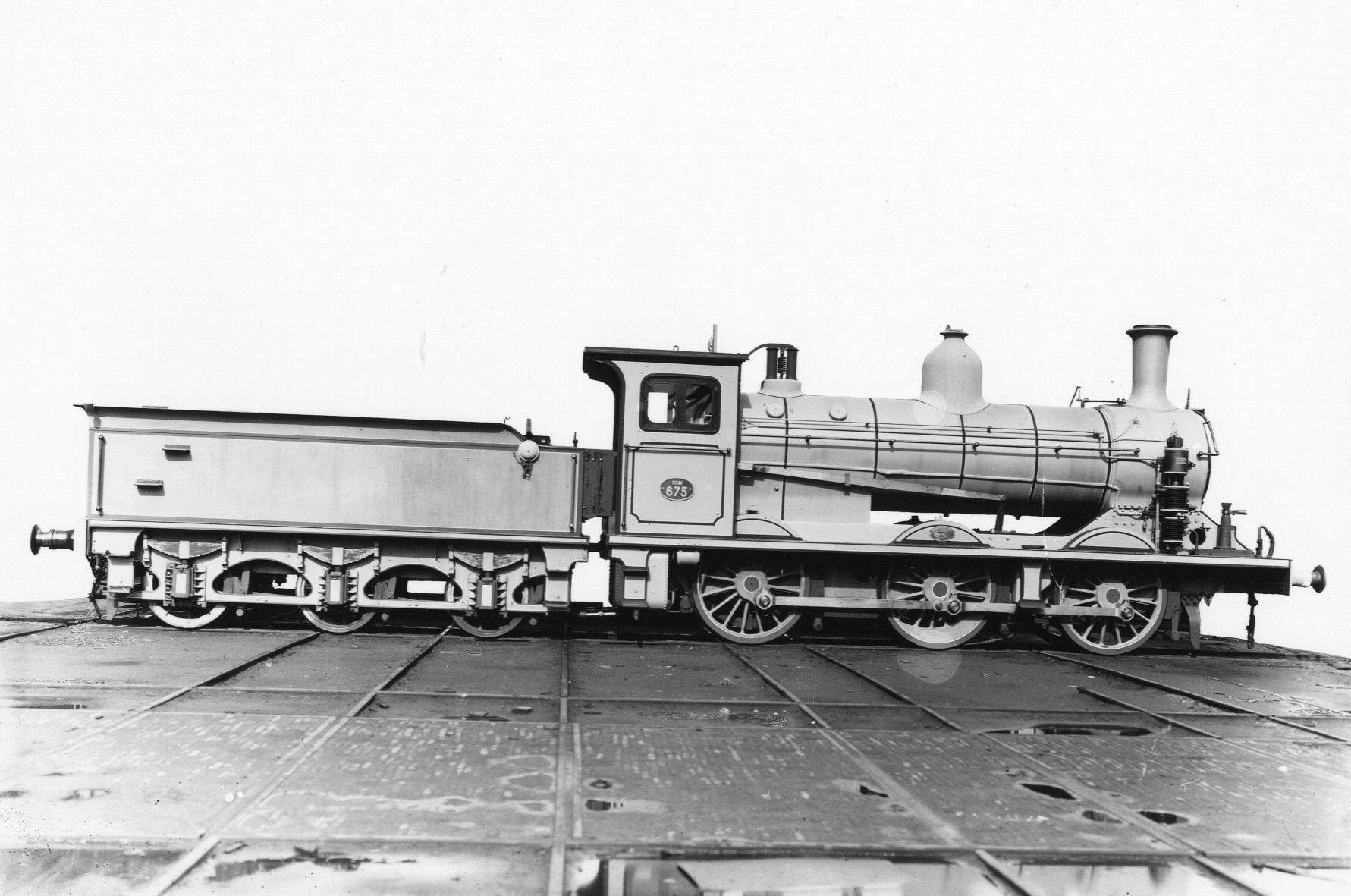
NS 3301 / HSM 675 (1912)

== Sources and references ==
- Waldorp, H. (1981). Onze Nederlandse stoomlocomotieven in woord en beeld. Alkmaar: De Alk. pp. 21–22. ISBN 90-6013-909-7.
- van der Meer, Jacq. (2009). De Hollandsche IJzeren Spoorweg-Maatschappij. Rosmalen: Uquilair. ISBN 978-90-71513-68-8.
- "Het Utrechts archief".
