= Proxy fight =

Shareholder contest for company control

A proxy fight, proxy contest or proxy battle is an unfriendly contest for control over an organization. It is a form of shareholder activism. This usually occurs when a corporation's stockholders develop opposition to some aspect of the corporate governance, often focusing on directorial and management positions. Corporate activists may attempt to persuade shareholders to use their proxy votes (i.e., votes by one individual or institution as the authorized representative of another) to install new management for any of a variety of reasons. Shareholders of a public corporation may appoint an agent to attend shareholder meetings and vote on their behalf. That agent is the shareholder's proxy.

In a proxy fight, incumbent directors and management have the odds stacked in their favor over those trying to force the corporate change. These incumbents use various corporate governance tactics to stay in power, including: staggering the boards (i.e., having different election years for different directors), controlling access to the corporation's money, and creating restrictive requirements in the bylaws. As a result, most proxy fights are unsuccessful; except those waged more recently by hedge funds, which are successful more than 60% of the time.

Previous studies have found that proxy fights are positively correlated with an increase in shareholder wealth.

== The process ==
Activist campaigns that lead to a proxy fight typically begin with an investor accumulating a minority stake in a public company. Crossing a 5% ownership threshold triggers a required disclosure to the U.S. Securities and Exchange Commission. Activists ordinarily first press their case in private with the board, seeking cost cuts, asset sales, a sale of the company, or a leadership change, and turn to public letters and presentations only if those talks stall. A proxy contest follows if negotiations fail.

Under the SEC's universal proxy rules, effective for meetings after August 31, 2022, each side's proxy card must list all duly nominated candidates. Those candidates are grouped by who nominated them and listed alphabetically within each group so shareholders voting by proxy can mix candidates from both slates up to the number of open seats. A dissident using the rule must solicit holders of shares representing at least 67% of the voting power entitled to vote in the election. Many contests are settled before any vote is cast.

== Examples ==
- An acquiring company, frustrated by the takeover defenses of the management, may initiate a proxy fight to install a more compliant board of the target.
- Internal opponents of a proposed takeover may initiate a proxy fight if they believe the deal would reduce shareholder value or increase the company’s risk. This occurred at Hewlett-Packard in 2002, when a faction of shareholders opposed the company’s merger with Compaq, then led by chief executive Carly Fiorina.
- Absent any looming takeover, proxy fights emerge from shareholders unhappy with management, with or without legal and equitable derivative suit grounds, as with Carl Icahn's effort in 2005–06 to oust most of the board of Time Warner.
- An early history of proxy fighting, detailing such 1950s battles as the fight for control of some of the largest U.S. corporations, including the Bank of America and the New York Central Railroad, can be found in David Karr's 1956 volume, Fight for Control.

== Key players ==
Due to their outsized influence with many institutional investors, proxy advisors play a key role in many proxy fights. In many cases, the proxy firms end up determining the result of the contest. The Securities Exchange Act of 1934 also gave the Securities and Exchange Commission (SEC) the power to regulate the solicitation of proxies. Some of the rules the SEC has since adopted, like the universal proxy, have been controversial because opponents have suggested that they would increase the amount of proxy fights.

== See also ==
- Proxy statement
