= International Institute for Advanced Studies in Systems Research and Cybernetics =

The International Institute for Advanced Studies in Systems Research and Cybernetics (IIAS) is a non-profit educational organization registered in Tecumseh, Ontario, Canada. Founded in 1980, the IIAS is committed to the development and promotion of Cybernetics and Systems Research and the advancement of interdisciplinary studies in the sciences, engineering, arts and humanities.

The IIAS hosts an annual conference in Baden-Baden, Germany with several interdisciplinary symposia in Baden-Baden, Germany, where researchers from around the world submit and share their papers on topics ranging from artificial intelligence and nanotechnology to risk analysis. The IIAS annual conference is known as the "InterSymp [Year] Conference" in academic circles.
