= Overweight (stock market) =

Term used within the stock market

Within the stock market, the term overweight can be used in two different contexts.

1. A rating of a stock by a financial analyst as having better value for money than other stocks. The other possible ratings are "underweight" and "equal weight", to indicate a particular stock's attractiveness.
2. A judgement of an investment portfolio that it holds proportionately more than the benchmark weight of a certain asset (a share, bond, industry/sector, country, currency, or asset class, etc.).

== Examples ==
=== Financial analysis rating ===
Definition 1: If a particular stock is selling for $500 and the analyst feels that the stock is worth $600, the analyst would be declaring the stock to be overweight.

Definition 2: Suppose that Technology stocks make up 10% of the relevant stock index by market value. For example, the weight of the Technology sector in the index could be 10%.

=== Investment portfolio ===
Overweight — Suppose that an investor holds 15% of his/her investment in Technology stocks. The investor's stock portfolio is then 15% weight in Technology stocks.

Suppose further that the investor is advised by his broker or financial adviser that technology stocks should be "overweight." The investor is being advised to hold more investments in Technology, as a percentage, than the weight of that asset in the index/market. In this example, the recommendation is to hold more than 10% of the value of Technology shares.

Underweight — In contrast to overweight holdings, if the broker advises that technology stocks should be "underweight," the recommendation to the investor is to hold less than 10% of the value of Technology shares.

Equal weight - The third possibility is that the broker advises that technology stocks should have "equal weight." In which case, the recommendation is to hold 10% of the value of Technology shares.

== See also ==
- Securities research
- Underweight (stock market)
- Buy and hold
