= Keisei 3300 series =

Japanese train type

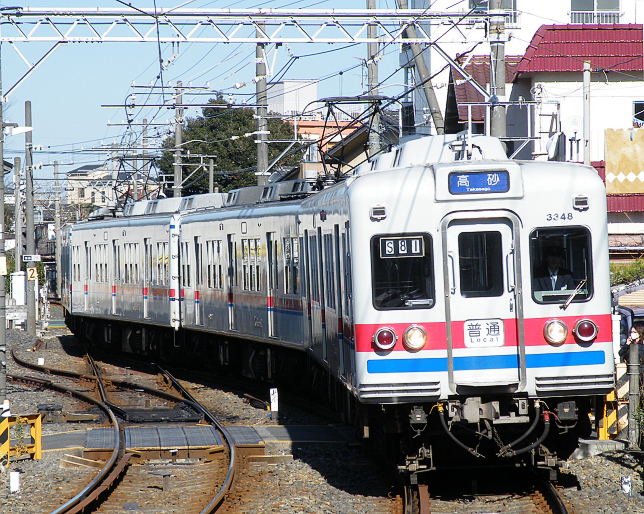
- A Keisei 3300 series EMU, January 2009
- In service: November 1968– February 2015
- Manufacturers: Tokyu Car Corporation, Nippon Sharyo, Kisha Seizo
- Constructed: 1968–1972
- Refurbished: 1989–1992
- Scrapped: 2003–2015
- Number built: 54 vehicles
- Number in service: None
- Formation: 4/6 cars per set
- Operator: Keisei Electric Railway
- Lines served: Keisei Main Line, Toei Asakusa Line

Specifications
- Car body construction: Steel
- Car length: 18 m (59 ft 1 in)
- Doors: 3 pairs per side
- Maximum speed: 100 km/h (60 mph)
- Traction system: Resistor control
- Electric system: 1,500 V DC
- Current collection: Overhead catenary
- Track gauge: 1,435 mm (4 ft 8 1/2 in)

The Keisei 3300 series (京成3300形) was a commuter electric multiple unit (EMU) train type formerly operated by the private railway operator Keisei Electric Railway in the Tokyo area of Japan from 1968 until February 2015.

== Operations ==
In their later years, the 3300 series sets normally operated on all-stations "Local" services on the Keisei Main Line.

== Formations ==
By 1 April 2014, the fleet consisted of just two four-car sets, formed as follows.

Designation	M2	M1'	M1'	M2

All cars were motored, and the two M1' cars were each fitted with one lozenge-type pantograph.

== History ==
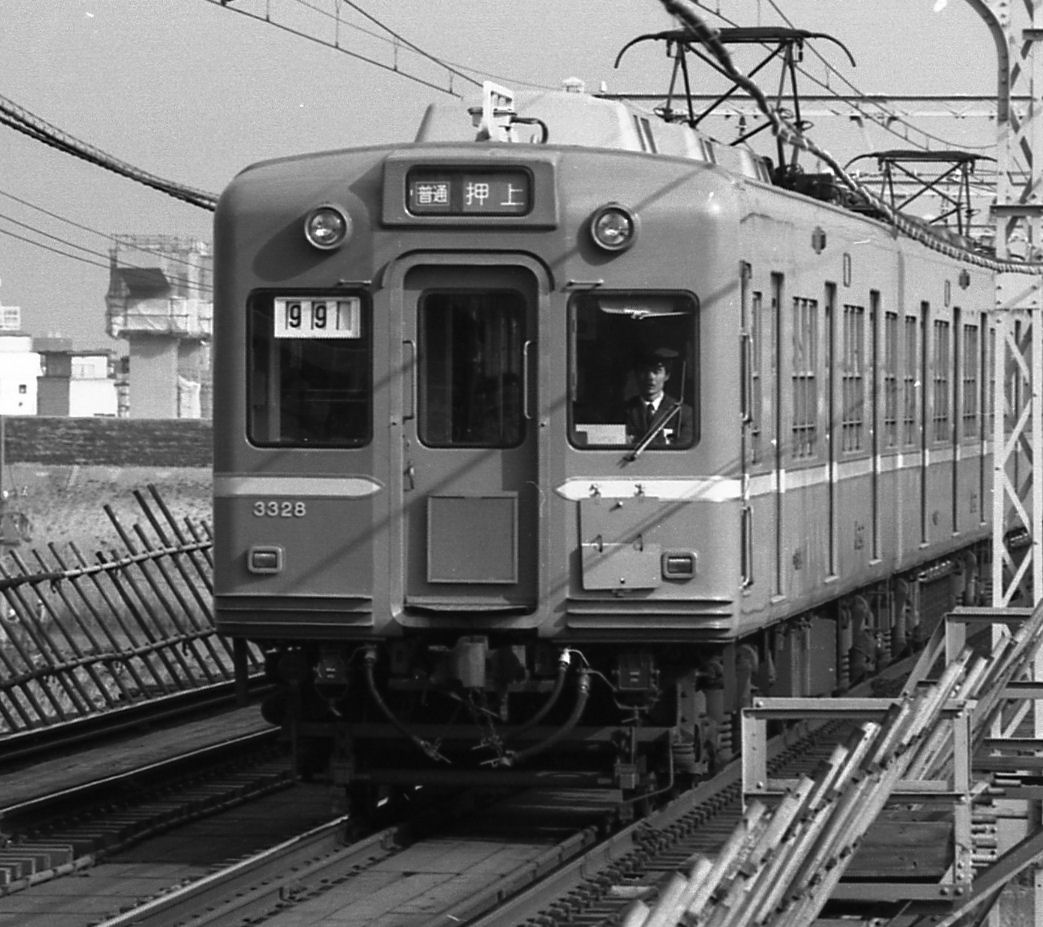
A 3300 series set in all-over orange livery before refurbishment, December 1984

The 3300 series trains entered service in November 1968. A total of 54 vehicles were built between 1968 and 1972. Initially without air-conditioning, roof-mounted air-conditioning units were installed to the fleet from 1984. The fleet was refurbished between 1989 and 1992, with the front headlamps moved to below the cab windows.

Withdrawals began in 2003 due to accident damage. The last remaining sets were withdrawn from service on 28 February 2015, following special commemorative limited express services run from Keisei Ueno to Narita.

== Liveries ==
The trains were initially painted in a two-tone livery of ivory and "fire orange" separated by a silver waistline stripe. From 1981, the livery was changed to all-over "fire orange" with an ivory waistline stripe, and from 1993, the trains were repainted into a new livery of "active silver" with "human red" and "future blue" bodyside stripes.

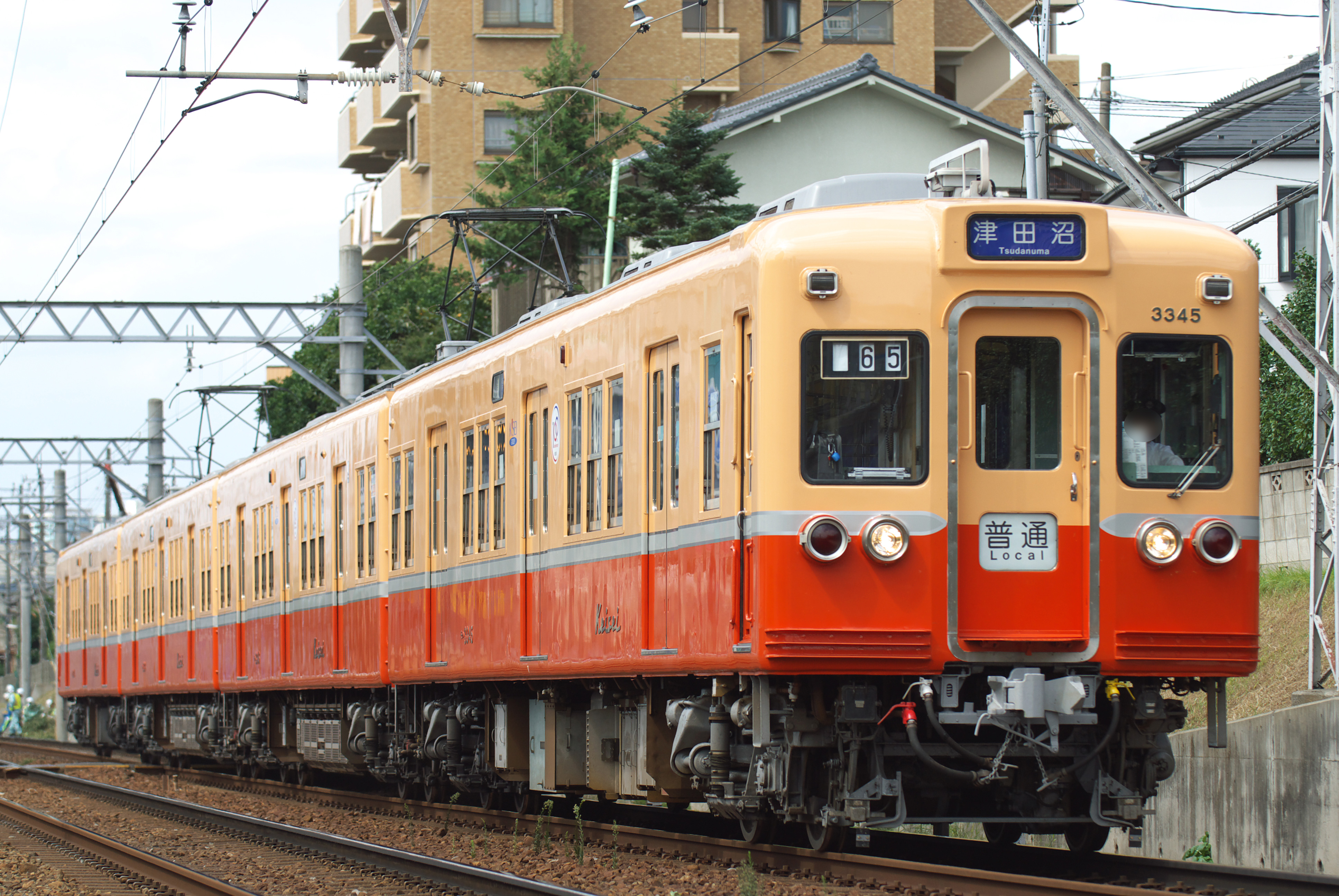
Set 3324 repainted into ivory and "fire" orange livery, September 2009

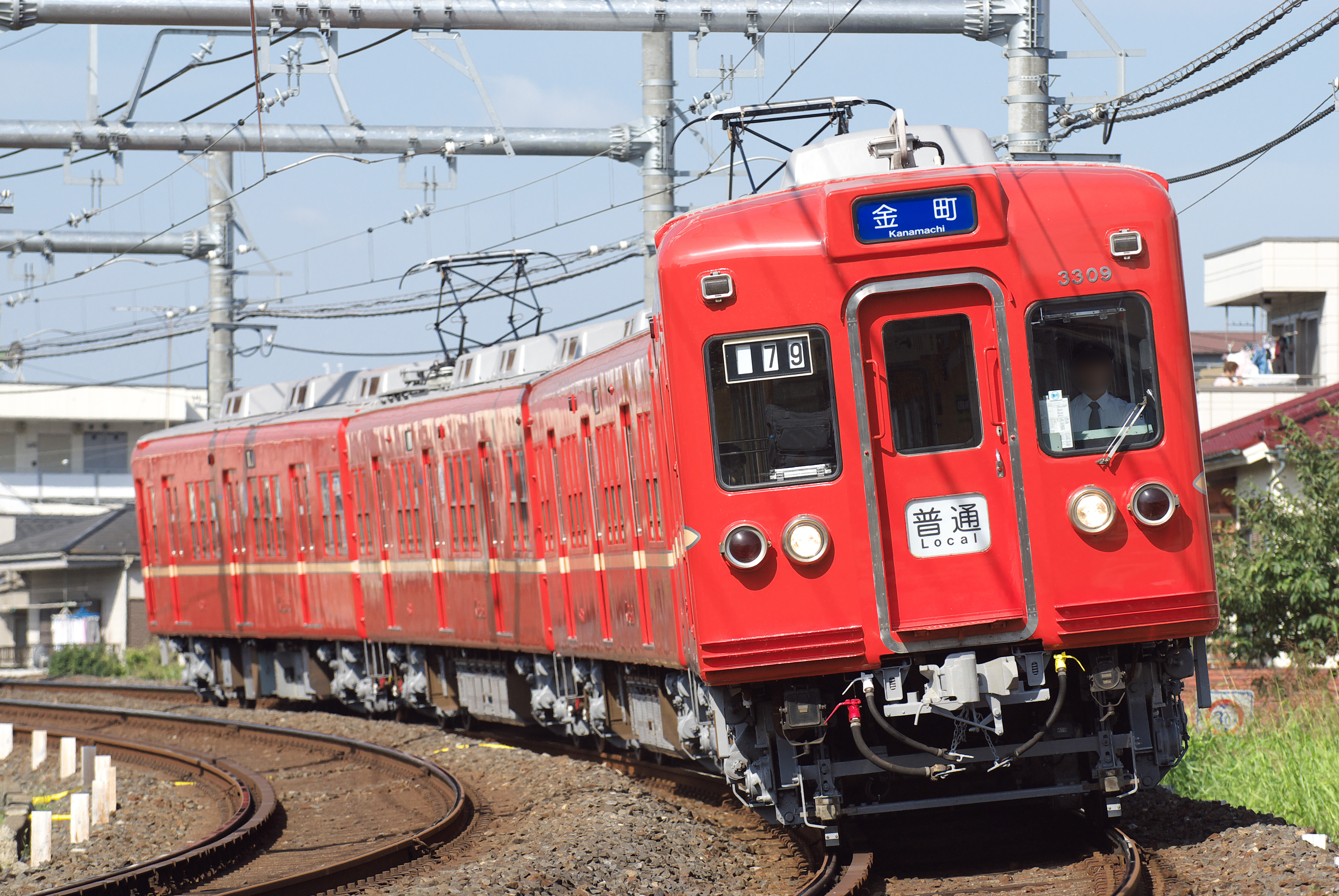
Set 3309 repainted into all-over "fire" orange livery, September 2009

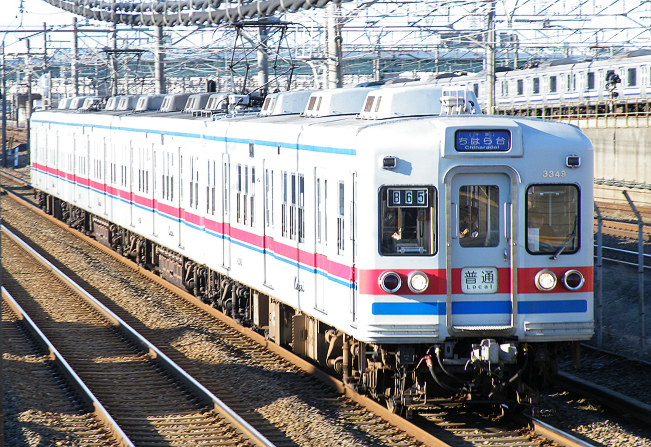
A 3300 series set in "Active" silver livery, January 2009

== Lease to Hokuso Railway ==
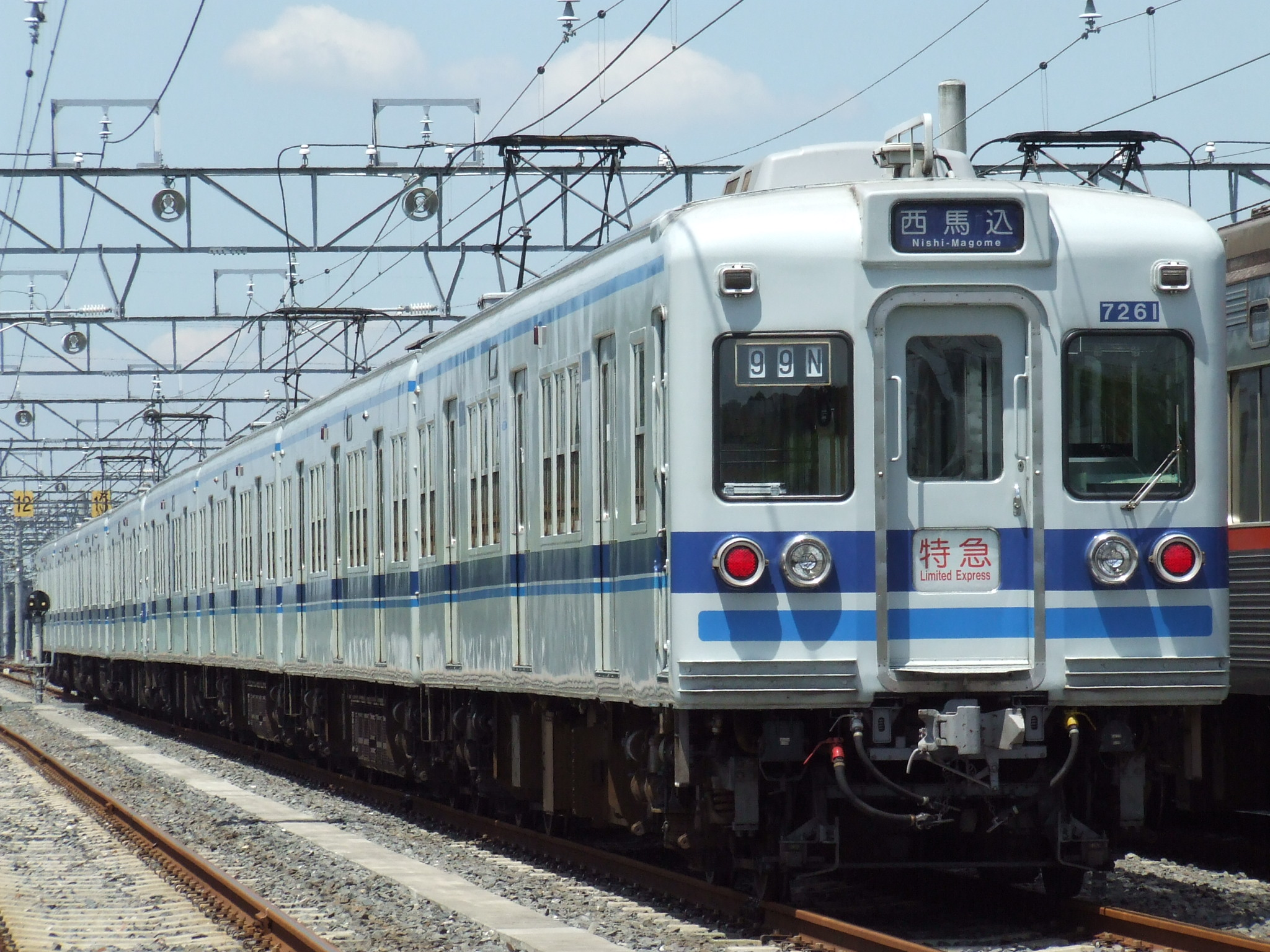
Hokuso Railway 7260 series set 7261, August 2007

Two four-car sets were leased to the third-sector Hokuso Railway in 2006, operating as an eight-car 7260 series unit, numbered 7261, until March 2015.
