= Altoona Metro Transit =

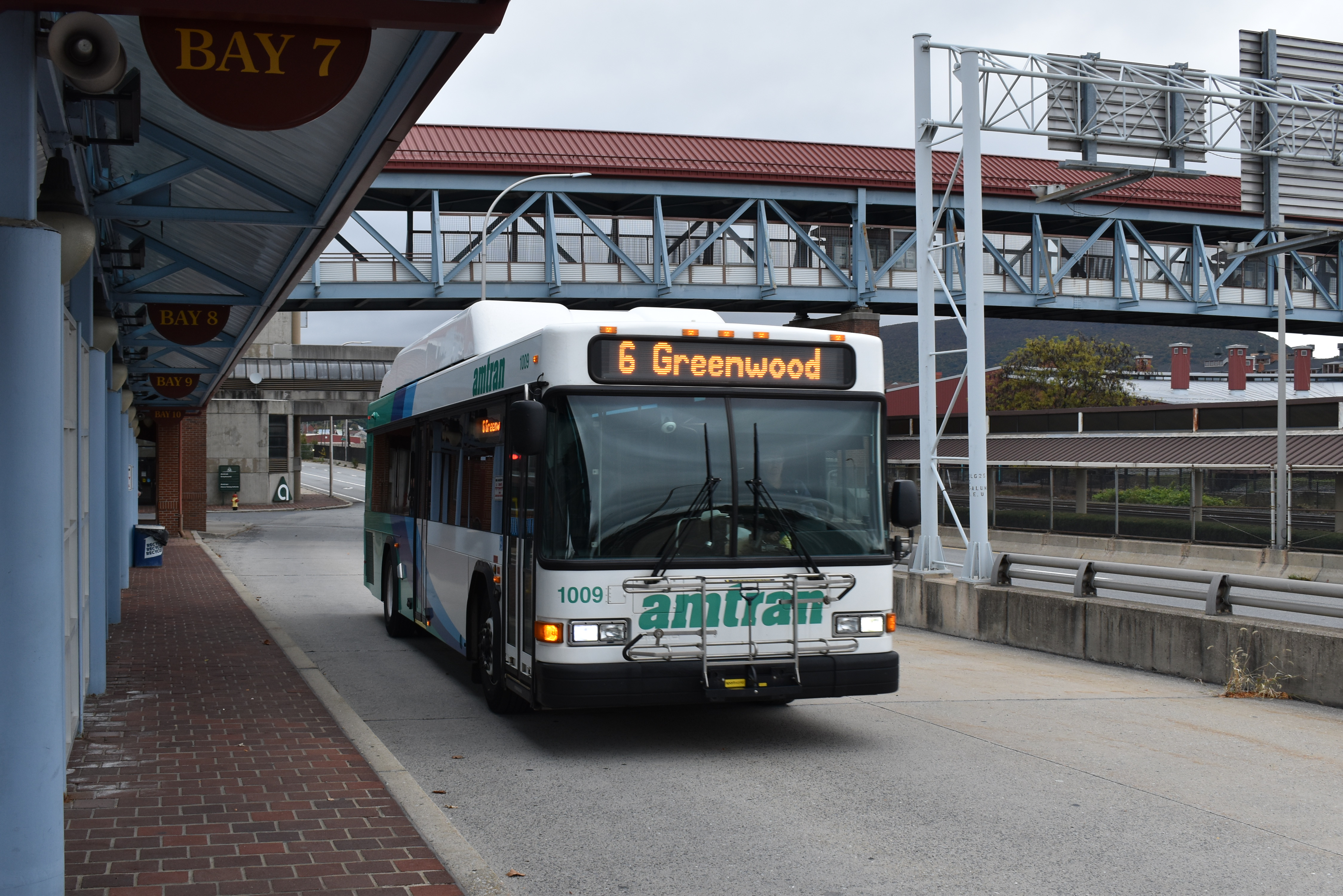
- An AMTRAN bus at the downtown transit center
- Founded: July 4, 1882; 143 years ago
- Headquarters: 3301 Fifth Avenue; Altoona, Pennsylvania
- Service area: Blair County, Pennsylvania
- Service type: Bus
- Routes: 13
- Daily ridership: 1,700 (weekdays, Q4 2025)
- Annual ridership: 492,500 (2025)
- Fuel type: CNG
- Website: amtran.org

Altoona Metro Transit (AMTRAN) is a public transportation service serving Blair County, Pennsylvania. It provides bus and paratransit service to Altoona, Hollidaysburg, and select communities in the region. Amtran offers a tripper for school students as well as shuttle services for Penn State Altoona. In 2025, the system had a ridership of 492,500, or about 1,700 per weekday as of the fourth quarter of 2025.

== See also ==
- Altoona and Logan Valley Electric Railway
