= Altoona and Logan Valley Electric Railway =

Pennsylvanian Railway Company

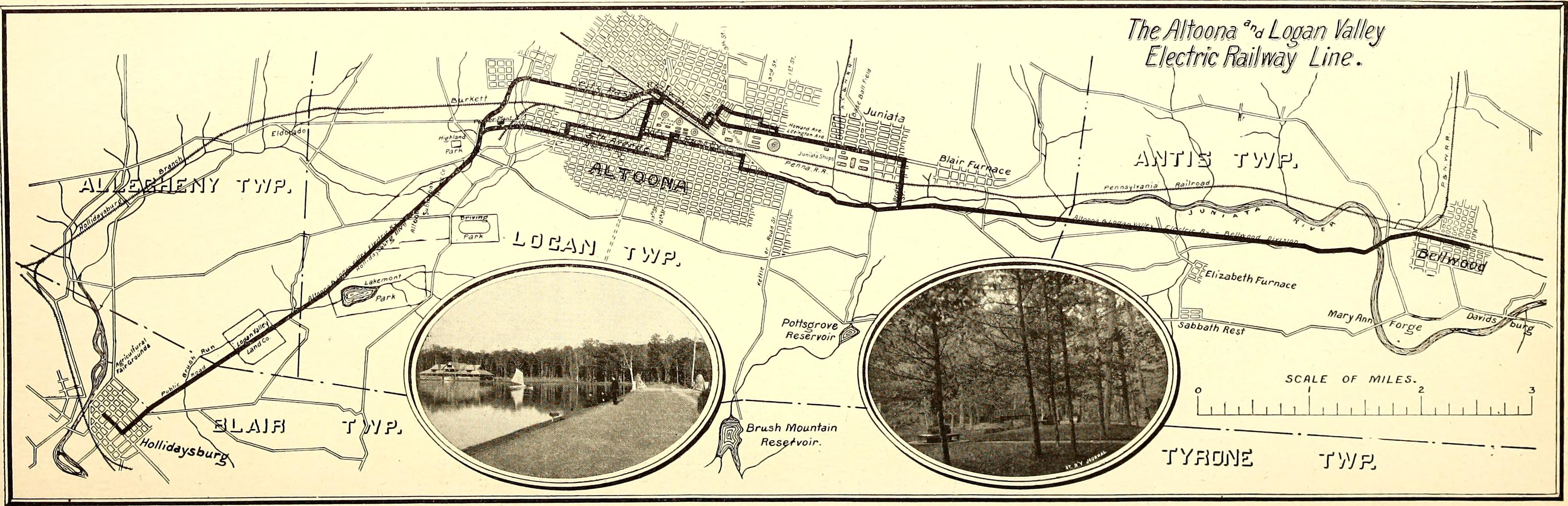
- Map of the Altoona and Logan Valley Electric Railway in 1894 with the then-under-construction Bellwood extension shown.

Overview
- Locale: Altoona, Pennsylvania
- Dates of operation: 1882–1954
- Predecessor: City Passenger Railway Company of Altoona
- Successor: Altoona and Logan Valley Bus Authority (Bus Service)

Technical
- Track gauge: 5 ft 3 in (1,600 mm)
- Electrification: 1891

The Altoona and Logan Valley Electric Railway was a streetcar and interurban company serving Altoona, Pennsylvania and its environs. It was built to an odd broad gauge of 5 ft 3 in (1,600 mm).

Horsecar service in Altoona began on July 4, 1882 under the City Passenger Railway Company of Altoona. The motive power was changed to electric in 1891, and the Altoona and Logan Valley Electric Railway was established. A new line to Hollidaysburg opened in 1893, and the company additionally built a trolley park at Lakemont Park to generate traffic. The Bellwood line opened the following year and was extended to Tyrone in 1902. The constituent companies which built the lines were consolidated under the name of the Altoona and Logan Valley Electric Railway in 1903. The company operated the city railway system, with the Tyrone line operated with interurban equipment.

In 1905, the railway was purchased by American Railways Company, a holding company that also owned the Scranton Railway, the People's Railway, the Springfield Railway Company, and other electric railways. (Note: The ARC also owned various electric utility companies through a 1901 merger with the Electric Company of America. In 1906, the Electric Company became the American Gas and Electric Company, which would be renamed American Electric Power in 1958.)

Tyrone service ended on April 1, 1938, with pieces of the final trolley dismantled by riders as souvineers. The Hollidaysburg streetcar finally ceased service on August 7, 1954. Bus service was initially slated to cease on March 31, 1957, though an order from the state's Public Utility Commission delayed this. The public Altoona and Logan Valley Bus Authority was formed to take over mass transit operations in the area (later known as Altoona Metro Transit).
