= Institutional Investor Advisory Services =

IiAS: Institutional Investor Advisory Services
- Type: Public Company
- Industry: Finance
- Founded: 2010
- Headquarters: Mumbai, Maharashtra, India
- Key people: Anil Singhvi (Founder Director); Amit Tandon (Founder & MD)
- Services: Corporate Governance and Proxy voting
- Website: iiasadvisory.com

Institutional Investor Advisory Services India Limited (known colloquially as IiAS) is an Indian proxy firm that provides voting recommendations on shareholder resolutions of Indian listed companies.

IiAS analyses shareholder resolutions to be addressed at AGMs, EGMs, postal ballots and Court Convened Meetings of nearly 300 companies listed on the Bombay Stock Exchange and National Stock Exchange of India, and provides voting recommendations on these resolutions to institutional shareholders. The company was founded in 2010 and commenced operations in 2011.

IiAS has been founded by Anil Singhvi and Amit Tandon. Anil Singhvi is a well-known financial expert in Indian markets and currently runs his own firm, ICAN Investors. Amit Tandon was earlier the CEO of Fitch Ratings in India.

India's proxy advisory industry is relatively nascent – there are three firms, of which IiAS is the largest and the most established.

== Board of directors ==
1. Anil Singhvi, Founder non-executive director
2. Deven Sharma
3. Robert Pavrey
4. Renuka Ramnath
5. Amit Tandon, Founder and managing director

== Shareholder rights and activism ==
There is a greater amount of participation by both retail and institutional shareholders in India. In 2014, several resolutions have been defeated by shareholders. In some cases, retail shareholders have taken legal action to stop companies from undertaking transactions.

=== SEBI regulations ===
In 2010, the Securities and Exchange Board of India (SEBI), India's market regulator, announced that mutual funds were required to disclose, annually, how they have voted on shareholder resolutions. Some mutual funds took notice and began voting on shareholder resolutions. Others remained passive and continued to abstain from voting.

To prompt resolute voting decisions, in 2014, SEBI asked mutual funds to publish the rationale for their voting decision. Additionally, SEBI shortened the reporting period – mutual funds were required to disclose their voting decisions on a quarterly basis.

=== E-voting ===
SEBI has mandated that all listed companies must enable e-voting on all resolutions through the depositories. Earlier, in shareholder meetings, votes were counted by show of hands. This meant that for shareholders to cast their votes, they had to physically attend meetings. So e-voting was introduced in India, which has allowed a dispersed set of investors to voice their opinion. While, e-voting has not materially increased voter turnout as yet, it has started to do so. But, the real implication of e-voting is in the manner in which the votes are counted. E-voting counts one vote per share held, which dramatically changes the counting from the show-of-hands method (of counting one vote per hand).

=== Changing regulations ===
SEBI guidelines, and in some instances, the Companies Act 2013, does not allow promoters or controlling shareholders to vote on transactions in which they have an interest: these transactions include all related party transactions (save where the transactions are with wholly owned subsidiaries or between two government entities), mergers and acquisitions with promoter-owned or promoter-controlled entities, and delisting resolutions. The revision in regulation has been brought in to give public shareholders a stronger voice; it enhances the power of public/ minority investor. This has brought on a significant change and has enabled non-promoter shareholders to defeat resolutions.

== Concerns raised by IiAS ==
One of the earliest cases IiAS took up was Akzo Nobel's (BSE: 500710 | NSE: AKZOINDIA | ISIN: INE133A01011) proposal to merge some privately owned companies with itself. Led by IiAS, institutional investors such as ICICI Prudential Life Insurance, Life Insurance Corporation (LIC) and UTI expressed their uneasiness with the deal as the private companies were valued steeply and this would have led to the promoter's stake going up in the listed entity after the merger. Though the company maintained that the deal added value, investors held their ground. Eventually, three days before a court-convened meeting of the shareholders, the company announced a buyback proposal to provide non-promoter shareholders with an exit option.

IiAS also raised concerns over the sudden return of Narayan Murthy in 2013 to Infosys (BSE: 500209 | NSE: INFY | ISIN: INE009A01021) – one of India's most respected companies. Not only did Narayan Murthy return to Infosys, he came with his son Rohan Murthy. IiAS argued that Infosys had compromised the very principles it strongly advocated during its rise to the top: having a retirement age for directors (both executive and non-executive), and that founders' children must not take up executive roles. But, following an exodus of key management personnel, Infosys appointed Dr. Vishal Sikka as CEO and Managing Director in 2014. Narayan Murthy and Rohan Murthy (whose term was co-terminus with Narayan Murthy) stepped down from Infosys upon Dr. Sikka's joining the board. At the time of his appointment to lead Infosys, Dr. Vishal Sikka was possibly one of the highest paid professionals in India, with an estimated compensation (including restricted stock options) of around US$7.1 million. IiAS recommended that shareholders vote for Dr. Sikka's appointment and his remuneration. IiAS reckoned that Infosys' decision to appoint Dr. Sikka must be looked at as an investment in its leadership that will bear returns in the future. Additionally, over 80% of his total remuneration, including restricted stock, was variable and based on target achievement.

In 2013, IiAS opposed Holcim's plan to restructure its holdings in India – by changing the ownership structures of Ambuja Cements (BSE: 500425 | NSE: AMBUJACEM | ISIN: INE079A01024) and ACC (BSE: 500410 | NSE: ACC | ISIN: INE012A01025). By virtue of the restructuring, ₹3.5 bn would flow out from the Indian companies to Holcim, with non-promoter shareholders in both companies getting no piece of it. IiAS called the deal unfair to minority shareholders of Ambuja Cements. Non-promoter shareholders in Ambuja Cements raised concerns regarding the deal, and following the outcry, Holcim decided to do a call with the Indian proxy advisory firms to explain the transaction. This was, arguably, the first time that an MNC directly engaged with Indian proxy advisory services.

In 2014, IiAS took on India's largest passenger car manufacturer, Maruti Suzuki's (BSE: 532500 | NSE: MARUTI | ISIN: INE585B01010) decision to let its parent company, Suzuki Motor Company, Japan, set up its third plant in Gujarat through a 100% subsidiary. IiAS believed this decision was not in favour of minority interest. Institutional investors wrote to Maruti raising concerns on the transaction. Following the investor outcry, Maruti made changes to the deal and announced that it would be put to vote – a decision in which the promoters would not vote. The vote is slated for the later part of 2014.

In 2014, IiAS made some bold recommendations of removing promoters from boards. IiAS recommended that Tulsi Tanti, owner and promoter of Suzlon Energy (BSE: 532667 | NSE: SUZLON | ISIN: INE040H01021), should not be reappointed to the board. IiAS also recommended that Dr. Vijay Mallya not be reappointed to the board of United Spirits (BSE: 532432 | NSE: MCDOWELL-N | ISIN: INE854D01016) – a company he established and later sold to Diageo plc.

In 2014, IiAS also questioned if India's largest real estate company, DLF (BSE: 532868 | NSE: DLF | ISIN: INE271C01023), should remain part of the CNX Nifty following a three-year ban by SEBI from accessing capital markets.
