= Institutional Shareholder Services =

Proxy advisory firm

Institutional Shareholder Services Inc.
- Type: Private
- Industry: Investment Management
- Founded: 1985; 41 years ago
- Headquarters: Rockville, Maryland, United States
- Key people: Gary Retelny (CEO)
- Services: Proxy advisory SRI advisory Corporate governance Market intelligence
- Parent: Deutsche Börse Group
- Subsidiaries: ISS-Ethix; FWW Fund Services
- Website: issgovernance.com

Institutional Shareholder Services Inc. (ISS) is an American proxy advisory firm. Hedge funds, mutual funds and similar organizations that own shares of multiple companies pay ISS to advise (and often vote their shares) regarding share holder votes. As the leading firm in the industry, ISS commands a 48 percent market share as of 2021, with its nearest rival, Glass Lewis, holding a 42 percent market share.

In response to ISS's recommendations to vote against fee-shifting provisions in the event of securities fraud litigation, some have criticized ISS and suggested that it needs to be regulated.

As of November 2025, ISS and Glass Lewis were the subject of an FTC antitrust investigation focused on how proxy advisors steer investors on controversial topics. In December 2025, President Donald Trump signed an executive order to reassess existing rules around proxy advisory firms, stating that they "regularly use their substantial power to advance and prioritize radical politically-motivated agendas."

In January 2026, JPMorgan announced that it will no longer use proxy advisors for shareholder votes, becoming the first major asset manager to end its reliance on such firms through the use of alternative AI tools.

== History ==
ISS was founded in 1985.

With Disney announcing the combination of the CEO and chairman positions on October 6, 2011, past the date of shareholder proposal deadline, and increase CEO/chair pay, ISS called for a no vote against the four Nominating and Governance Committee board members at the 2012 annual meeting. ISS recommended to clients two candidates nominated by billionaire investor Carl Icahn to the drugmaker Forest Laboratories’ board of directors in a 2012 proxy contest.

In 2013, ISS agreed to pay the SEC a fine of $300,000 and retain an independent compliance consultant to settle charges that it failed to safeguard the confidential proxy voting information of clients. ISS was highlighted in a 2014 opinion piece in the New York Times by Cornell University law professor Lynn Stout as having an outsized power in the selection of CEOs of major corporations in the United States with ramifications for the U.S. economy. It was owned by MSCI until April 30, 2014 when it was purchased by Vestar Capital Partners.

Ethix SRI Advisors was purchased by ISS to help ISS expand into Europe. Ethix was renamed with the acquisition to ISS-Ethix and would lead ISS's sustainable and responsible investment activities. In 2017, ownership of ISS switched to Genstar Capital. In March 2018, ISS also acquired the German ESG rating agency oekom research AG. In November 2020, Deutsche Börse announced the acquisition of a majority in ISS-shares for about 1.5 billion Euro.

=== Acquisitions ===
In September 2015, ISS acquired Ethix SRI Advisors, a provider of sustainable and responsible investment (SRI) research and solutions such as corporate engagement, screening, monitoring and assessing companies’ performance.

In January 2017, ISS acquired IW Financial, a U.S.-based firm offering environmental, social, and governance (ESG) research, consulting, and portfolio management solutions.

In June 2017, ISS acquired Climate Neutral Investments (CNI), the Investment Climate Data division of the South Pole Group.

In February 2018, ISS acquired EVA Dimensions, a provider of cash-flow-based analysis of corporate performance.

In March 2018, ISS acquired oekom AG, a provider of environmental, social, and governance (ESG) ratings and data.

In February 2019, ISS acquired CAER, a Canberra-based research company that has worked with institutional investors seeking to monitor portfolio companies’ ESG policies, practices, and disclosures since 2000.

In October 2020, ISS acquired FICO Cyber Risk Score Business, which helps organizations in their efforts to measure, manage and reduce cyber risk.

In February 2021, ISS acquired ACRe Data, a provider of ESG Scoring for the U.S. Municipal marketplace.
