= Proxy firm =

Firm advising shareholders or voting on their behalf

A proxy firm (also a proxy advisor, proxy adviser, proxy voting agency, vote service provider or shareholder voting research provider or proxy voting advisory businesses (PVABs)) provides services to shareholders (in most cases an institutional investor of some type) to vote their shares at shareholder meetings of, usually, listed companies.

The typical services provided include agenda translation, provision of vote management software, voting policy development, company research, and vote administration including vote execution. According to their websites, not all firms provide voting recommendations and those that do may simply execute client voting instructions.

The votes executed are called "Proxy Votes" because the shareholder usually does not attend the meeting and instead sends instructions - a proxy appointment - for a third party, usually the chairman of the meeting to vote shares in accordance with the instructions given on the voting card.

== Industry regulation ==
In the United States, on July 22, 2020, following years of complaints and lobbying by issuers and their associations about the role and influence of some proxy research firms, the SEC voted to regulate of proxy research firms. Issuers had alleged that proxy research firms were exercising undue control over substantial parts of the annual meeting vote thereby effectively forcing issuers to purchase expensive consulting services should those same publicly traded companies wish proposals on executive compensation and similar issues to receive a positive vote. However, in 2022 the SEC adopted certain amendments that rescinded those rules, including:

- Rule 14a-2(b)(9)(ii), and related safe harbors and exclusions, which provided proxy voting advisory businesses with two conditions for exemption from the proxy rules’ information and filing requirements:
  - PVABs must make their advice available to the companies that are the subject of their advice at or before the time that they make the advice available to their clients; and
  - PVABs must provide their clients with a mechanism by which they could reasonably be expected to become aware of any written statements by registrants who are the subject of the advice regarding the PVAB’s proxy voting advice.
- Note (e) of Rule 14a-9 (Liability Rule), which provides examples of material misstatements or omissions related to proxy voting advice.
- Supplemental Proxy Voting Guidance to investment advisers about their proxy voting obligations as set forth in Rule 14a-2(b)(9)(ii).

In the United Kingdom, to achieve compliance with the Shareholders Rights Directive, proxy advisors are required to be listed on the Financial Conduct Authority's website.

== Global industry ==
Firms in the industry include:

- Egan-Jones Proxy Services, part of Egan-Jones Ratings Company (United States)
- Glass, Lewis & Co (United States)
- Institutional Shareholder Services (United States)
- Institutional Investor Advisory Services India Limited (IiAS) (India)
- IVIS (United Kingdom)
- Minerva Analytics Ltd (United Kingdom)
- PIRC Ltd (United Kingdom)
- Sustainalytics (part of MorningStar) (United States)
- GIR inc. (Canada)

== Controversial role ==
The role of proxy firms has come under considerable scrutiny in recent years, most notably from the corporate lobby in the United States.

In 2013, the US Securities and Exchange Commission fined ISS $300,000 for revealing non-public information in respect of clients proxy votes.

In May 2018, the Rock Center for Corporate Governance at Stanford University published an overview of the Proxy Advisor industry authored by J. Copland, D. Larcker and B. Tayan. Some of the most concerning key findings of this report include:

1. Number one player, ISS, and number two, Glass, Lewis & Co, together would have 97% market share of the industry.
2. Limited transparency on the process these firms use to amend their proxy voting guidelines, although ISS at least gives some insight into its process.
3. Neither of these two largest players discloses any of its past or current recommendations publicly, making it impossible to verify the historical validity of their voting recommendations.
4. While evidence suggests that ISS recommendations are more influential on ultimate investor voting decisions than those from Glass, Lewis & Co, both have an impact, which can range from shifting 5%-30% of shareholder votes.
5. Most of the academic research suggests that the proxy advisor recommendations do not add shareholder value, and that they in fact result in negative outcomes for shareholders.
6. These firms have no fiduciary duty to anyone and therefore it is very difficult to hold them accountable for their work.
7. These firms can succumb to conflicts of interest, which are often not disclosed.
8. These firms may have resource constraints, which could negatively impact the quality of their recommendations.

The researchers conclude that the industry exhibits signs of market failure, in that despite their demonstrated poor track record and questionable practices, the market has not been able to gradually eliminate them and they have in fact thrived.

These findings stand in contrast to the 2015 report of the European Securities Markets Authority ("ESMA"), which concluded that, after a comprehensive public investigation process, there was "no clear evidence of market failure in relation to proxy advisors’ interaction with investors and issuers".

== Conflicts of interest ==
A potential conflict of interest identified by the Government Accountability Office is that some owners of proxy firms do business with both issuers and investors. Analysis of executive remuneration, or executive pay, is a notable feature of the work of shareholder voting research. Some policymakers believe that increasing competition in the industry may improve service quality. For example, in 2010 a Securities & Exchange Commission consultation document asked whether certain issues in the proxy advisory industry, including conflicts of interest, are affected by limited competition.

In April 2019, Glass, Lewis & Co controversially did not recuse itself from issuing voting recommendations in a proxy contest at Knight Therapeutics, a Canadian company. In advance of the May 7th, 2019 vote, Glass, Lewis & Co sided with the slate of nominees which included Kevin Cameron, a co-founder and past senior executive at Glass, Lewis & Co itself. This precedent could encourage future activist shareholders to include past proxy advisor senior executives in their nominee slates to unfairly obtain favorable recommendations.

== Code of conduct ==
Following a number of regulatory reviews by securities regulators, including the Canadian Securities Administrators and the European Securities and Markets Authority (ESMA) a number of firms have published a Code of Conduct: the Best Practice Principles for Shareholder Voting Research. The Code was developed with an independent chairman, Dr Dirk Zetsche, Propter Homines Chair for Banking and Securities law at the Institute for Financial Services of the University of Liechtenstein and Director of the Center for Business & Corporate Law at Heinrich Heine University in Duesseldorf/Germany.

== See also ==
- Proxy statement
