= Glass Lewis =

American proxy advisory services company

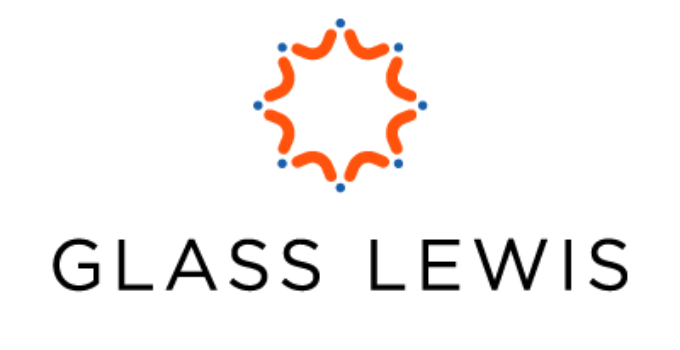
- Company type: Private
- Industry: Governance Solutions
- Founded: 2003; 23 years ago
- Headquarters: 225 California Street, Suite 1100; San Francisco, California, United States
- Area served: Worldwide
- Key people: Bob Mann, CEO; Kevin Cameron, Cofounder; Carrie Bush, President
- Products: Proxy vote management software; proxy paper research reports; governance hub
- Services: Active ownership engagement solution; controversy alerts; equity compensation plan advisory; proxy voting policies; M&A and other financial transaction research; regulatory reporting; class-action settlements; share recall support
- Owner: Peloton Capital Management; Stephen Smith
- Number of employees: 360
- Subsidiaries: Glass Lewis Europe Ltd, IVOX Glass Lewis, CGI Glass Lewis, Glass Lewis Corporate (affiliate)
- Website: www.glasslewis.com

Glass, Lewis & Co. (Glass Lewis) is a major American proxy advisory services company. As of spring 2019, Glass Lewis controlled 28% of the proxy advisory market for mutual funds; this makes it the second-largest company in the market behind Institutional Shareholder Services. The primary services provided by Glass Lewis are research and recommendations for shareholder votes by institutional investors, including a digital platform for managing these votes and reporting. A large fraction of those investors follow the recommendations of Glass Lewis in lockstep, giving it outsize importance and impact on governance across the corporate sphere.

Founded in 2003, Glass Lewis is headquartered in San Francisco and has offices in New York, Washington DC, Kansas City, Ireland, Germany, and Australia.

In September 2006, Glass Lewis acquired Sydney-based proxy advisory firm Corporate Governance International which then became known as CGI Glass Lewis. In November 2008, Glass Lewis acquired Washington Analysis, a political and economic advisory firm based in Washington, D.C. Founded in 1973 and rated among the Best Analysts of the Year by Institutional Investor magazine, Washington Analysis anticipates and analyzes the impact of political, legislative and regulatory developments on the financial markets.

In June 2015, Glass Lewis acquired IVOX GmbH, Germany's leading independent provider of proxy advisory and governance services for institutional investors.

Until March 2021, Glass Lewis was owned by the Ontario Teachers' Pension Plan, and the Alberta Investment Management Corp. In March 2021, Peloton Capital Management, a private equity firm, and Stephen Smith, a financial services entrepreneur, acquired Glass Lewis from Ontario Teachers' Pension Plan and the Alberta Investment Management Corp.

In October 2025, under pressure from Republican lawmakers, the company announced plans to fundamentally change the way it provides research findings and voting recommendations, including no longer offering uniform voting recommendations to clients. Specific benchmarks will no longer be used in the future.

== Knight Therapeutics board slate controversy ==
In April–May 2019, Glass, Lewis & Co controversially did not recuse itself from issuing voting recommendations in a proxy contest at Knight Therapeutics, a Canadian company. In advance of the May 7th, 2019 vote, Glass, Lewis & Co sided with the slate of nominees which included Kevin Cameron, a co-founder and past senior executive at Glass, Lewis & Co itself. This precedent could encourage future activist shareholders to include past proxy advisor senior executives in their nominee slates to unfairly obtain favorable recommendations. Additionally, Cameron did not disclose in any of his publicly released biographies at the time the fact that he was on the board of directors of two separate public companies as they filed for bankruptcy (ECOTality - ticker:ECTY and Reddy Ice - ticker:FRZ). This raised concerns about neutrality and disclosure which are particularly significant given the company's outsize impact on the broader corporate sphere and access to extensive sensitive information where neutrality is difficult to confirm and tempting to discard.

== Notable policies ==
Glass Lewis' benchmark policy may recommend voting against boards of directors that are not adequately diverse.
