= List of anti-vaccination groups =

Swedish CDC. (FHoM) they are restricting vaccine to a very narrow group

A list of groups who are anti-vaccine, vaccine-critical, or vaccine hesitant.

== Global ==
- White Rose (disinformation group)
- World Chiropractic Alliance

== Europe ==
=== Austria ===
- Democratic – Neutral – Authentic
- MFG Austria – People Freedom Fundamental Rights

=== Denmark ===
- Freedom List

=== Finland ===
- Crystal Party
- Power Belongs to the People
- Freedom Alliance (Finland)

=== France ===
- National League for Liberty in Vaccination

=== Germany ===
- Grassroots Democratic Party of Germany
- WiR2020

=== Greece ===
- Free People

=== Hungary ===
- Normális Élet Pártja

=== Iceland ===
- Responsible Future

=== Italy ===
- 3V Movement
- Vita
- ENZIAN-Südtirol

=== Netherlands ===
- List30

=== Slovenia ===
- Resni.ca

=== Turkey ===
- New Welfare Party
- Party of Life without Imposition

=== United Kingdom ===
- Humanitarian League (historical)
- JABS
- Let London Live
- National Anti-Vaccination League (historical)
- Pioneer Club (historical)

== North America ==
=== Canada ===
- Vaccine Choice Canada
- Free Party Canada

=== United States ===
- Anti-Vaccination League of America
- Anti-Vaccination Society of America
- Association of American Physicians and Surgeons
- The Autism Community in Action (TACA; formerly Talk About Curing Autism)
- Children's Health Defense
- Children's Medical Safety Research Institute
- Freedom Angels Foundation
- Health Freedom Idaho
- Informed Consent Action Network
- Learn The Risk
- National Vaccine Information Center
- New Jersey Coalition for Vaccination Choice
- Ohio Advocates for Medical Freedom
- Palmetto Family Council
- Put Children First
- Stop Mandatory Vaccination
- Texans for Vaccine Choice

== Oceania ==
=== Australia ===
- Australian Vaccination-risks Network
  - Church of Conscious Living
- Health Australia Party
- Homeopathy Plus!
- Informed Medical Options Party

=== New Zealand ===
- Advance New Zealand
- NZ Outdoors & Freedom Party
- New Zealand Public Party
- The Freedoms & Rights Coalition
- Voices for Freedom
- Warnings About Vaccination Expectations NZ
