= IAS =

IAS may refer to:

== Science ==
- Institute for Advanced Study, in Princeton, New Jersey, United States
- Image Analysis & Stereology, the official journal of the International Society for Stereology & Image Analysis.
- Iowa Archeological Society, United States
- Iranian Arachnological Society, for the study of arachnids in Iran
- International AIDS Society, an association of HIV/AIDS professionals
- Institute of Agricultural Sciences, Banaras Hindu University, in India
- Institute for Advanced Study at University of Minnesota in Minneapolis, Minnesota
- Institute of Advanced Study (Durham) in Durham, North East England
- IEEE Industry Applications Society
- International Association of Sedimentologists

== Government ==
- Indian Administrative Service, the Indian administrative civil service
- Intergovernmental Affairs Secretariat (Canada)
- Internal Audit Service (European Commission)

== Finance ==
- International Accounting Standards
- Investment Analysts Society of Southern Africa
- various numbered International Financial Reporting Standards

== Religion ==
- International Association of Scientologists
- International Association of Sufism

== Politics ==
- Institute for Anarchist Studies
- Izquierda Asturiana, a political party in Spain
- Immunisation Awareness Society, a New Zealand anti-vaccination group
- International Aviation and Shipping emissions, specifically greenhouse gas emissions arising from those sectors (the term also used in the United Kingdom Climate Change Act 2008)

== Aeronautics ==
- Indicated airspeed
- Institute of Aerospace Sciences, in the United States
- Institut aéronautique et spatial, in France
- Iași International Airport, IATA designation for the airport in Iași, Romania
- IAS Cargo Airlines, a British airline

== Computing ==
- IAS machine, the first electronic computer built at the Institute for Advanced Study
- Interactive Application System, a DEC PDP-11 operating system
- Internet Application Server, alternate name for Oracle Application Server
- Internet Authentication Service, a component of Windows Server

== Other uses ==
- Instituto Ayrton Senna, an NGO in Brasil
- Insulin autoimmune syndrome, a rare cause of reversible autoimmune hypoglycemia
- Integral Ad Science, an American technology company that analyzes the value of digital advertisements
- International Automated Systems, an American company
- IAS Limited an Australian-based gambling company
- Internal anal sphincter, human anatomy

== See also ==
- Institute for Advanced Study (disambiguation)
