= Stephen Shore (professor) =

American autistic professor of special education

- Born: Stephen Mark Shore; September 27, 1961 (age 65)
- Education: University of Massachusetts Amherst (BA); Boston University (MA & Ed.D)
- Known for: Autism education research Autism Speaks; Anti-vaccine activism
- Spouse: Yi Liu (m. 1990)
- Scientific career
- Fields: Special education
- Workplaces: Adelphi University
- Website: Official website

Stephen Mark Shore (born September 27, 1961) is an American autistic professor of special education at Adelphi University. He has authored, co-authored or edited several books on autism, including College for Students with Disabilities, Understanding Autism for Dummies, Ask and Tell, and Beyond the Wall. He serves on the board of controversial nonprofit Autism Speaks, and is one of the first two openly autistic board members in its history. He once headed the Asperger's Association of New England and was on the board of the Autism Society of America (ASA).

Shore has falsely speculated that vaccinations given in early childhood make people more likely to be autistic and questioned the safety of the vaccine preservative thiomersal. He collaborated with other anti-vaccine activists to write Understanding Autism for Dummies.

== Early life ==
Shore began displaying various autistic traits (including becoming unable to speak) at 18 months of age. At 2-and-a-half years of age, doctors labeled him "psychotic" (with "atypical development" and "strong autistic tendencies") and recommended institutionalization. Instead, Shore's parents began what he would later describe as "an intensive, home-based early intervention program emphasizing music, movement, sensory integration, narration, and imitation." At age 4, Shore started speaking again and was re-labeled "neurotic." At that time, his parents were able to enroll him in a therapeutic nursery school that had previously refused to admit him. By age 5, his speech had normalized.

In elementary school, Shore was bullied by classmates and struggled to perform at grade level in math and reading. According to Shore, he was initially unable to communicate with his classmates in a way they could understand, repeating sounds rather than using the spoken language he had learned. He has also said his teachers did not know how to reach him and that he voraciously read books on topics that interested him.

At age 9, Shore took a job as a paperboy. In middle school, he became a restaurant busboy, but lost that job due to slow work performance caused by the sensory overstimulation he experienced. His next job was repairing bicycles, something he continued to do to earn money during the rest of his secondary education and while studying at the undergraduate level. Shore's academic performance improved while attending middle school and high school, where he learned to play several musical instruments.

Shore grew up in Newton, Massachusetts.

== Post-secondary education ==
Shore was awarded two Bachelors of Arts (one in accounting and information systems and the other in music education) by the University of Massachusetts Amherst in 1986. He was awarded a Master of Arts in music education and a Doctor of Education in special education by Boston University in 1992 and 2008, respectively.

Shore did well academically and socially as an undergraduate student, falsely leading him to assume he had "outgrown" autism. While studying for his master's degree, he experienced significant difficulty on a portion of a qualifying exam, which prompted him to undergo another neuropsychological evaluation. At that time, he was given a diagnosis of "learning disorder not otherwise specified with characteristics consistent with childhood autism." Shore has difficulty completing assignments presented in unfamiliar formats, which motivated him to switch his academic concentration from music education to special education while earning his doctorate.

== Autism-related views and activities ==
=== "Regressive autism" and vaccines ===
Shore has labeled the presentation of autistic traits following an early period of apparently typical neurological development "regressive autism" and an "autism bomb."

While testifying before the United States House of Representatives in 2002, Shore stated the following:

Most of us here today have involuntarily been inducted into this community by the autism [bomb]. What happens? A child is born and develops typically until 18 to 24 months, suddenly hit with a bomb that spreads its shrapnel from the child to the family, to education, the community, and humanity at large. The child loses verbal ability; withdrawal from the environment occurs. We often see self-abusive and self-stimulatory behaviors, tantrums. I was hit with that very same bomb at age 18 months with all those wonderful characteristics that we see going with it.

In the 2006 book Understanding Autism for Dummies, Shore and his co-authors falsely speculated that such a presentation was caused by certain vaccines (such as the MMR vaccine), certain vaccine ingredients (such as thiomersal), or too many vaccines given within a short period and suggested parents consider an alternative vaccination schedule. A chapter in the book written by Andrew Wakefield collaborator Jane El-Dahr also falsely suggested that thiomersal could cause mercury poisoning in autistic children and recommended chelation therapy as a potential remedy. Temple Grandin, who wrote the book's foreword and who Shore wrote "read every chapter and made helpful suggestions," has also falsely speculated that vaccines cause autism, especially in cases in which children become non-speaking after being vaccinated. Anti-vaccine activist Jeff Bradstreet was acknowledged in the book (along with El-Dahr and others) for providing medical guidance; anti-vaccine activist and ASA co-founder Bernard Rimland was also thanked for his assistance.

In 2003, Shore had engaged in similar false speculation, telling USA Today that vaccines and thiomersal were potential catalysts for autism and that he believed autistic traits closely resembled the symptoms of mercury poisoning. Shore also said he believed that removing thiomersal from vaccines was a positive step, "Because you shouldn't be injecting mercury into anyone." That same year, in the book Asperger Syndrome: A Guide for Professionals and Families, Shore stated the following:

Where exactly does autism come from? There are many different ideas. I think there's a strong hereditary component, which seems to get triggered by something else—maybe a vaccination, maybe sensitivities to diet, maybe something from the environment.

In 2008, Shore once again speculated that vaccines, diet or environmental factors could trigger autism in the genetically predisposed while speaking at a World Health Organization seminar in Japan. During the seminar, Shore also replaced his usual "autism bomb" metaphor with an "autism dragon" metaphor.

During a 2013 Radio New Zealand podcast appearance, Shore falsely speculated that a subset of autistic children was "susceptible to a bad immune-system reaction from a vaccine" and suggested researchers investigate such a possibility. Shore also said he supported the development of "safe vaccinations."

It is scientific consensus that there is no link between any vaccine or vaccine ingredient and autism and that the thiomersal used as a preservative in some vaccines is not harmful. Chelation therapy is unproven as an autism treatment and potentially life-threatening when improperly administered. Autism is typically diagnosed between the ages of 18 and 24 months, the same age range in which Shore told Congress the "autism bomb" detonates.

=== Autism Speaks leadership role ===
In December 2015, Shore and consultant Valerie Paradiz became the first two openly autistic people to sit on the national board of directors of controversial autism-focused nonprofit Autism Speaks. Prior to their board appointments, they both sat on the organization's family services committee. At the time, Shore said he believed Autism Speaks was in a period of transition precipitated by the resignations of various members of leadership (including cofounder and board chairman Bob Wright and president Liz Feld) and stated the following:

After ten years of telling us, "[I]t's time to listen," Autism Speaks now visibly listening to people on the autism spectrum is a very good sign.

The Autistic Self Advocacy Network (ASAN), an autistic-led nonprofit, stated that Shore and Paradiz's appointments did not rectify the damage the organization had done to the autistic community, signal an appreciation of that damage or reflect a willingness to change course. ASAN criticized Autism Speaks for systemically excluding autistic people from leadership, siphoning funds from local communities, spending a disproportionate amount of money on biomedical research and fundraising (while neglecting services and supports), and spreading "profoundly harmful language and rhetoric."

Roughly two years before Shore and Paradiz joined its board of directors, autistic author John Elder Robison resigned from Autism Speaks' science and treatment advisory boards following a written statement made by cofounder Suzanne Wright that contained stigmatizing and pathologizing language and themes. At the time of his resignation, Robison stated the following:

Autism Speaks says it's the advocacy group for people with autism and their families. It's not, despite having had many chances to become that voice. Autism Speaks is the only major medical or mental health nonprofit whose legitimacy is constantly challenged by a large percentage of the people affected by the condition they target.

In response to the Shore and Paradiz appointments, Robison said he hoped Autism Speaks would adopt a more constructive focus and stated, "I wish Valerie and Stephen all the success in the world in moving Autism Speaks onto a healthier course." Referring to Robison, Shore said that he and Paradiz stood "on the shoulders of giants."

In 2017, Julia Bascom (then ASAN's executive director) told Mother Jones that Autism Speaks was still focused too heavily on funding genetic research and accused the organization of failing to listen to or amplify the voices of autistic people. Shore told the publication he believed Autism Speaks was engaging with autistic people in a more meaningful way than in the past, but it would take more time for the organization to transition away from its focus on genetic research. He also said he would like to see more autistic people in positions of leadership; at that time, only two of the organization's 30 board members (including Shore) were openly autistic.

In the 2020 book Autistic Community and the Neurodiversity Movement: Stories from the Frontline, Robison once again commented on Shore and Paradiz joining Autism Speaks' board, stating that, while he applauded their appointments, he had yet to see the organization implement any "substantive autistic-led initiatives."

As of April 2025, ASAN's main points of criticism toward Autism Speaks had not changed. Further, ASAN noted that openly autistic members of the board still comprised a small minority (two of 29 members) and current and former representatives of major corporations comprised the majority (19 of 29 members).

As of October 2026, Shore still sits on Autism Speaks' board. Paradiz sat on the board through December 2018. The organization installed another openly autistic board member, former consultant and venture capitalist Judy Benardete, in April 2023. In 2026, it added openly autistic film and television composer John Frizzell to its website's list of board members.

=== Opposition to functioning and severity labels ===
In April 2024, Shore and clinical psychologist Robert Naseef co-authored an op-ed for the website Autism Spectrum News, opposing the use of all autistic functioning and severity labels (including "profound," "severe," and "high-functioning"), which they considered divisive, stigmatizing, and contrary to the neurodiversity paradigm. In the piece, they stated, "As opposed to more levels and splits, we propose personalized services for all Autistics, ranging from those having advanced education and fulfilling employment to more challenged individuals who are nonspeaking or have medical or mental health conditions." They also accused proponents of the "profound autism" label of ignoring autistic voices and cautioned that a community split on the issue combined with the United States' "toxic political environment" could endanger the 2024 reauthorization of the Autism CARES Act.

=== Carl the Collector ===
Shore acted as an advisor during the initial production of PBS Kids animated series Carl the Collector. The show's protagonist, Carl, and a supporting character, Lotta, are autistic. It premiered in November 2024.

== Personal life ==
Shore married musician Yi Liu on June 10, 1990 in Cape Cod, Massachusetts. The two met while attending a graduate-level music theory class at Boston University.

Shore is Jewish. He often plays the Yiddish love song Tumbalalaika on the piano, having originally been exposed to it by his parents in early childhood. He began frequently attending religious functions and giving lectures at Chabad houses in the mid-2010s after seeking a place to worship near Adelphi University during the High Holy Days.
