= Bernard Selz =

Fund manager and anti-vaccination supporter

- Born: February 7, 1940 (age 86)
- Occupation: Businessman
- Known for: Founder of Selz Capital
- Spouse: Lisa Selz
- Children: 2

Bernard Thierry Selz (born February 7, 1940) is a fund manager and anti-vaccination supporter based in Manhattan. His wife Lisa serves as president of the Selz Foundation, a charitable group. They are major financiers of anti-vaccination groups.

== Early life and education ==
Selz earned a bachelor's of art degree from Columbia College in 1960. He is married to Lisa Selz; they have two adult children.

In 1961, Selz was driving an automobile that hit actor John Payne while Payne was crossing Madison Avenue in New York City. Payne was severely injured and had to recover in the hospital. Selz claimed not to have seen Payne.

== Businesses ==
Selz founded Selz Capital in November 2003. The firm is headquartered in New York City. It has approximately $750 million from 24 high net worth clients under management. It employs four people.

Previously, he served as the Senior Managing Director at ING Furman Selz. He founded that firm in 1973. He began his career in the securities industry in 1960 at Lazard Freres.

== Charitable activities ==
The Selz Foundation has been described operating "with a focus on humanitarian, educational, geriatric, homeopathic, animal causes and the arts." The foundation has been a major supporter of LaGuardia Community College in Queens and Columbia University where it has endowed professorships in medieval art and Pre-Columbian art and archaeology. The foundation does not accept unsolicited requests.

The Selz Foundation provides roughly three-fourths of the funding for the Informed Consent Action Network, an anti-vaccination charity led by Lisa Selz and Del Bigtree. The foundation also gave $1.6 million to two non-profits, one of which (AMC Foundation) funded Autism Media Channel LLC, the group that produced the 2016 American documentary film Vaxxed. . In total, the Selz Foundation is estimated to have donated over $3 million to the anti-vaccine movement.

Bernard Selz sits on the board of World Monuments Fund and has sat on the boards of the Center for Jewish History, and the Frick Collection.
