= Stephen Shaw =

Stephen Shaw may refer to:

- Stephen Shaw (ombudsman) (born 1953), prisons and probation ombudsman in the UK
- Stephen William Shaw (1817–1900), California pioneer artist
- Steve Shaw (tennis) (born 1963), British professional tennis player

== See also ==
- Steven Shaw (disambiguation)
- Stephen Shore (born 1947), American photographer
- Stephen Shore (professor) (born 1961), professor of special education at Adelphi University
