= Informed Consent Action Network =

American anti-vaccination group

- Abbreviation: ICAN
- Formation: 2016
- Founder: Del Bigtree
- Purpose: Anti-vaccination advocacy group
- Location: Austin, Texas
- Official language: English
- CEO: Del Bigtree
- Chief Operating Officer: Catharine Layton
- Public Relations: James Scherrer
- Budget: $23 million (2023)
- Staff: 5 (2019)
- Website: icandecide.org

The Informed Consent Action Network (ICAN) is one of the main anti-vaccination groups in the United States. Founded in 2016 by Del Bigtree, it spreads misinformation about the risks of vaccines and contributes to vaccine hesitancy, which has been identified by the World Health Organization as one of the top ten global health threats of 2019. Arguments against vaccination are contradicted by overwhelming scientific consensus about the safety and effectiveness of vaccines.

== Funding and activities ==
ICAN was founded in 2016 by television producer Del Bigtree, after the release of the movie Vaxxed: From Cover-Up to Catastrophe, which he wrote and produced, with anti-vaccination activist Andrew Wakefield directing. The national attention Bigtree gained with the movie and its promotion tour allowed the newly-formed group to quickly assume a leading role among the anti-vaccination movement. Scientists have countered many of ICAN's statements, arguments against vaccination being contradicted by overwhelming scientific consensus about the safety and efficacy of vaccines.

ICAN was established with a $100,000 grant from the Selz Foundation. Its budget ballooned to $1.4 million in 2017, with one million coming from the Selz Foundation, making ICAN the most well-funded anti-vaccination group in the United States that year. In 2019, the Selz had stopped their funding, but ICAN received $2.46 million funneled through the donor-directed charitable trust investment firm T. Rowe Price, out of total revenue of $3.46 million. ICAN reported making $5.5 million in revenue in 2020, a 60% increase from the previous year. The group received a significant part of its funding in the early days of the pandemic from the charitable foundations from investment firm that anonymize donations: $235,000 from Fidelity Investments' foundation (2021-22), $600,000 from The Vanguard Group's foundation (2020 to 2022), $400,000 from Schwab Charitable (2020 to 2022), $135,000 from the Morgan Stanley Global Impact Funding Trust (2020 and 2021). It also received $15,000 from Donors Trust (2021). In 2022, ICAN received a total of $13.4 million in funding, then $23 million in 2023.

In 2019, ICAN paid a salary of $232,000 to Del Bigtree as its CEO, $162,000 to its Executive Producer Jenn Sherry Parry, $138,000 to its Chief Administrative Officer Catharine Layton, and 111,000 to Patrick Layton as Creative Director. An article in Rolling Stone states that Layton stumbled upon the anti-vaccine movement on social media after her two sons were diagnosed with autism. By 2022, Bigtree's compensation had increased to $284,000. In 2023, the CEO earned $234,000 while also working on Robert F. Kennedy Jr. 2024 presidential campaign.

Despite spreading misinformation about vaccines, the group received a federal loan of $165,600 through the Paycheck Protection Program in 2020. It also holds Facebook fundraisers, this contributing $23,000 to its bottom line in 2021. Like other anti-vaccination groups, ICAN directs their Instagram followers to a fundraising tool.

Much of the group's funding is spent on legal fees, with a total approaching $20 million being paid to law firm Siri & Glimstad.

Given the impact they had during the height of the COVID-19 pandemic, ethicist Arthur Caplan commented that funding ICAN and similar groups might have grave consequence in future epidemics.

In 2019, Bigtree was a keynote speaker at several anti-vaccination events targeting the ultra-Orthodox Jewish in Brooklyn and in Rockland County. He has been criticized by the Anti-Defamation League and the Auschwitz-Birkenau Memorial and Museum for wearing a Star of David at an anti-vaccination event, attempting to compare the treatment of those opposed to vaccination with the persecution of the Jewish people. Bigtree's anti-vaccine advocacy has been described by anti-vaccination movement critic physician David Gorski as "fear mongering based on misinformation".

In 2020, Facebook and Youtube removed Del Bigtree's anti-vaccination show The Highwire from their social media platforms, as part of efforts to limit the spread of disinformation about COVID-19. ICAN sued them for that, alleging the audience of the videos have decreased by half since they had to relocate it on their own website, although it continued streaming on Twitter. ICAN lost the court case in early 2022.

Experts observing the anti-vaccination movement believe ICAN is crafting its communications in order to appeal to the segment of the population that distrusts expertise and government. Bigtree regularly appears in events that cater to those ideologies, including an event in October, 2020, at Trump National Doral Miami, a Florida resort owned by Donald Trump, where several leading figures of the QAnon movement also spoke.

== Access to information lawsuits ==
ICAN spends a large part of its budget on legal fees, paid to Siri & Glimstad. The law firm has made a specialty out of challenging vaccine mandates during the COVID-19 pandemic.

In 2018, ICAN filed Freedom of information lawsuits to force the Food and Drug Administration, the National Institutes of Health and the Department of Health and Human Services (HHS) to release administrative reports on childhood vaccine injury HHS is required to file with Congress. HHS replied that they could not find any such reports. While ICAN claimed the absence of these reports means that the federal government has neglected to properly study the effect of vaccines, scientists and the fact-checking site PolitiFact pointed out a large number of in-depth studies were undertaken and their results shared with the public, even though HHS failed to file the required reports.

Dorit Reiss, a Professor of Law at the University of California, explained, "ICAN uses FOIA requests as a query, asking questions that likely do not have government records." She added, "when the government, predictably, says they do not have such records (because many of CDC's statements on scientific matters are based, for example, on scientific literature rather than government records), ICAN misrepresents that as showing there is no evidence - where all the answer shows is that there is no specific record."

== See also ==
- Herd immunity
- Science Moms
- Lancet MMR autism fraud
