= New Jersey Coalition for Vaccination Choice =

State-level anti-vaccination group

- Abbreviation: NJCVC
- Formation: 2008
- Founder: Maureen Drummond
- Purpose: Anti-vaccination group
- Region served: New Jersey
- Official language: English

The New Jersey Coalition for Vaccination Choice (NJCVC) is a state-level anti-vaccination group advocating against mandatory vaccination. Scientists and medical experts have countered many of these statements, arguments against vaccination being contradicted by overwhelming scientific consensus about the safety and efficacy of vaccines.

== Goals ==
Since its foundation in 2008 by Sue Collins and Maureen Drummond, the group's spokespersons have been advocating against mandatory vaccination for school children. While they reject the "anti-vaccine" label, they repeat messages common to other anti-vaccination groups about the alleged lack of testing of multiple vaccines, while denying vaccination was effective in eliminating infectious diseases such as polio.

Several experts such as Paul Offit have said campaigns by groups such as the New Jersey Coalition for Vaccination Choice contribute to vaccine hesitancy, even as New Jersey's vaccination rates decline, putting the population in increasing danger.

== New Jersey vaccine exemptions ==
New Jersey Coalition for Vaccination Choice was instrumental to bringing some 400 protesters to the New Jersey State House on December 12, 2019, as legislators were debating a measure meant to tighten the state's vaccine exemption regulations. Supported by anti-vaccination activist Del Bigtree, some of the parents said they would take their children out of school rather than have them vaccinated. A call for action by the group brought an angry crowd to committee hearings in 2018 when state legislator were debating a similar measure.

A 2009 meeting between representatives of the group, including anti-vaccination activist Louise Kuo Habakus, and New Jersey governor Chris Christie put the governor in political difficulty when he seemed to agree with the debunked belief that vaccines cause autism.

== See also ==
- Herd immunity
- Science Moms
- Vaccination and religion
- Vaccination policy
