= Steven Shaw =

Steven Shaw may refer to:

- Banachek (Steven Shaw, born 1960), American mentalist and magician
- Steve Shaw (actor) (1965–1990), American actor
- Steve Shaw (tennis) (born 1963), British tennis player
- Steven A. Shaw (1969-2014), American food critic

== See also ==
- Stephen Shaw (disambiguation)
