= Steven A. Shaw =

American lawyer and food critic (1969–2014)

Steven Anthony Shaw (June 10, 1969 – April 8, 2014) was an American lawyer and food critic. He was one of the first writers to start a food blog. He was the co-founder of eGullet, a popular online message board for the restaurant community.

== Early life and education ==
Shaw was born in Manhattan, New York City, on June 10, 1969. His mother Penelope Shaw was a former soloist with the Erick Hawkins Dance Company. She later was the director of sports programs for the disabled at Hunter College. She is of Jewish and Italian descent. His father Peter Shaw was a professor of English at Stony Brook University.

Shaw graduated from Stuyvesant High School and the University of Vermont. In 1994, he received a Juris Doctor degree from Fordham University School of Law.

== Career ==
After college, Shaw worked for the Manhattan law firm Cravath, Swaine & Moore. He practiced law for about five years before he started his food blog. He learned a great deal about food while on his firm's open-ended expense account. From his experiences, he prepared a restaurant "survival guide" for the city of Wilmington, Delaware where his firm often was in court. The guide was popular among many New York law firms. In late 1999, he quit the firm to work in online journalism. The early death of his father of a heart attack at the age of 58 inspired him to pursue a career that he would truly enjoy.

In 1998, Shaw created his website The Fat Guy's Big Apple Dining Guide (www.shaw-review.com). He was known online by the name "Fat Guy". By 2002, it had hundreds of restaurant reviews, essays on food, and dining out, and had around 250,000 visitors per month.

In 2001, Shaw co-founded eGullet with Jason Perlow, officially known as the eGullet Society for Culinary Arts & Letters, an online message board for the restaurant community. As of 2005, it received over 3 million page views per month and had more than 16,000 registered members. The website was considered one of the first global online food communities. Anthony Bourdain used the website to do research for his television program. He made posts asking for help finding people from places where he was going to film who could provide guidance on local food.

In 2000, Shaw wrote the article "The Zagat Effect" for Commentary in which he was deeply critical of the Zagat guide.

In 2002, Shaw took a trip across Canada. He wrote a six-part series on the meals he had for the Ottawa Citizen and its sister newspapers.

Before his death, Shaw was the Director of New Media Studies at the International Culinary Center and was the community manager for Quirky.

He was a contributor to numerous publications including Food & Wine, Saveur, Food Arts, and The New York Times.

== Awards and honors ==
In 2002, Shaw won a James Beard award for Internet Column and Feature Writing for his piece A Week in the Gramercy Tavern Kitchen which was published on his website Fat-Guy.com. That same year, he was also nominated for a James Beard award for Best Magazine or Newspaper Writing on Nutrition or Consumer Food Issues for his piece Mad Cows & Englishmen in Commentary Magazine.

== Personal life ==
Shaw was married to Ellen Shapiro. Together they had a son.

Shaw died in Manhattan on April 8, 2014, at the age of 44.

== Books ==
- Asian Dining Rules: Essential Strategies for Eating Out at Japanese, Chinese, Southeast Asian, Korean and Indian Restaurants (William Morrow Cookbooks, 2008)
- Turning the Tables: The Insider's Guide to Eating Out (HarperCollins, 2006)
- The Menu New York: The Best Restaurants and Their Menus (Ten Speed Press, 2003)
