= Institut aéronautique et spatial =

- Company type: Incentive
- Industry: ISO
- Founded: 1980; France
- Headquarters: Toulouse

Institut aéronautique et spatial (IAS) is the French aeronautical industry's education coordinator. IAS was created in 1980 and is located in Toulouse. It is directly under the supervision of GIFAS (French Aerospace Industries Association) international committee. IAS’members are the major aeronautics & space companies such as EADS Group, Safran Group, Thales Group, Dassault Aviation, Airbus, Eurocopter, and the aerospace equipment group, including SME's. IAS is member of Institut au service du spatial, de ses applications et technologies.

== Aim ==
The aim of IAS is to develop a network of international partners, major players in the aeronautical space field in their countries, using 3 main vectors:

- Academic training with graduation;
- Continuing education and professional trainings;
- Support for research cooperation.

== See also ==
- IAS (disambiguation)
