= Institute for Advanced Study (disambiguation) =

Institute for Advanced Study is a center for theoretical research in Princeton, New Jersey, US.

Institute for Advanced Study or Institute of Advanced Studies may also refer to:

== Organizations ==
=== Some Institutes for Advanced Study ===
- Some Institutes for Advanced Study (SIAS), members:
  - Institute for Advanced Study, Princeton, New Jersey, US
  - Radcliffe Institute for Advanced Study, Cambridge, Massachusetts, US
  - Netherlands Institute for Advanced Study, Amsterdam, the Netherlands
  - Berlin Institute for Advanced Study, Berlin, Germany
  - Israel Institute for Advanced Studies, Jerusalem, Israel
  - Swedish Collegium for Advanced Study, Uppsala, Sweden

=== Germany ===
- Frankfurt Institute for Advanced Studies, Frankfurt
- Freiburg Institute for Advanced Studies, Freiburg
- Lichtenberg-Kolleg Institute for Advanced Study, Göttingen Observatory
- TUM Institute for Advanced Study, Garching

=== Hong Kong ===
- Hong Kong Institute for Advanced Study, City University of Hong Kong
- HKUST Jockey Club Institute for Advanced Study, Hong Kong University of Science and Technology

=== Hungary ===
- Institute of Advanced Studies Kőszeg, Kőszeg
- Institute for Advanced Study at Central European University, Budapest

=== United States ===
- Hagler Institute for Advanced Study, Texas
- Institute for Advanced Study at University of Minnesota, Minneapolis, Minnesota
- Krasnow Institute for Advanced Study, Fairfax, Virginia

=== Elsewhere ===
- Dublin Institute for Advanced Studies, Dublin, Ireland
- IMT Institute for Advanced Studies Lucca, former name of IMT School for Advanced Studies Lucca, Italy
- Indian Institute of Advanced Study, Shimla, India
- Institute for Advanced Study, Tsinghua University, Beijing, China
- Institute for Advanced Studies (Vienna), Vienna, Austria
- Johannesburg Institute for Advanced Study, Johannesburg, South Africa
- Korea Institute for Advanced Study, Seoul, Korea
- Libyan Institute for Advanced Studies, Tripoli, Bayda, and Tobruk, Libya
- Peter Wall Institute for Advanced Studies, British Columbia, Canada
- Institute for Advanced Studies, University of Luxembourg
- Institute of Advanced Study, Durham University, England

== See also ==
- Adventist International Institute of Advanced Studies, Silang, Cavite, Philippines
- European Institute for Advanced Studies in Management, Brussels, Belgium
- IAS (disambiguation)
- Institut des Hautes Études Scientifiques, Bures-sur-Yvette, France
- Institute for Advanced Studies in Basic Sciences, Zanjan, Iran
- Institute for Advanced Studies in the Humanities, University of Edinburgh, Scotland
- Institute for Advanced Study of Human Sexuality, San Francisco, California, US
- Institute of Advanced Legal Studies, London, England
- Institute of Advanced Studies in Education, Rajasthan, India
- International Institute for Advanced Studies in Systems Research and Cybernetics, Baden-Baden, Germany
- National Institute of Advanced Studies, Bengaluru, Karnataka, India
- Ramanujan Institute for Advanced Study in Mathematics, Chennai, India
- Research Institute for Advanced Studies, Baltimore, Maryland, US
- School of Advanced Study (SAS), University of London, England
