= Learn The Risk =

American anti-vaccination group

- Legal status: Non-profit
- Purpose: Anti-vaccination group
- President: Tina Marie
- Founder: Brandy Vaughan (deceased 2020)
- Website: https://learntherisk.org/

Learn The Risk is an American anti-vaccine group founded in 2015. It is known for its billboard campaigns asserting vaccines are responsible for a large number of deaths of young children. Arguments against vaccination are contradicted by overwhelming scientific consensus about the safety and effectiveness of vaccines.

Founder Brandy Vaughan died in December 2020; no replacement executive director has been named. Five and a half years before she died, she made a video stating that she was in fear for her life and that she was not suicidal. The coroner report states she died of a blood clot.

== Mission ==
Learn The Risk was founded in 2015 by Brandy Vaughan, as a branch of an organization she also founded, the Council for Vaccine Safety. Vaughan led both groups as executive director. She described herself as a former employee of pharmaceutical company Merck and an activist for natural health.

The group is widely described as being anti-vaccination.

With an annual budget of less than US$100,000 according to tax filings, Learn The Risk does not have the wide reach of larger anti-vaccination groups such as Informed Consent Action Network and Children's Health Defense. The organization got some funding out of the Amazon Prime program, which allowed consumers to donate a small portion of their purchase to the charity of their choice. The program helped fund several similar groups until Amazon moved to exclude anti-vaccine activists from the program, in the Spring of 2019.

== Billboard campaigns ==
In the Fall of 2018, the organization bought space on more than 30 billboards in West Virginia, New York, Missouri and other states, provoking concerns from health professionals that parents may delay or disregard vaccinations for their children. The message used on the billboards claimed vaccines kill children, portraying specific cases even though there was no evidence supporting the claims.

A similar billboard campaign in the Summer of 2018 in Perth, Australia, met with resistance from health professionals and calls for its removal.

The World Health Organization has identified vaccine hesitancy as one of 2019's ten global health threats to watch. Although a small fraction of vaccine doses provoke serious adverse reactions, health professionals agree the benefits of being protected against a wide range of infectious diseases far outweigh the risks. Among other public health agencies, the Public Health Agency of Canada stated that the science on vaccines is unequivocal, but laments the actions of "a small but vocal anti-vaccination community that spreads false information. They use powerful emotional images and misinformation with their message. This creates confusion and fear for parents who are trying to make the best decisions for the health and wellbeing of their children."
