= White Rose (disinformation group) =

Group spreading COVID-19 disinformation

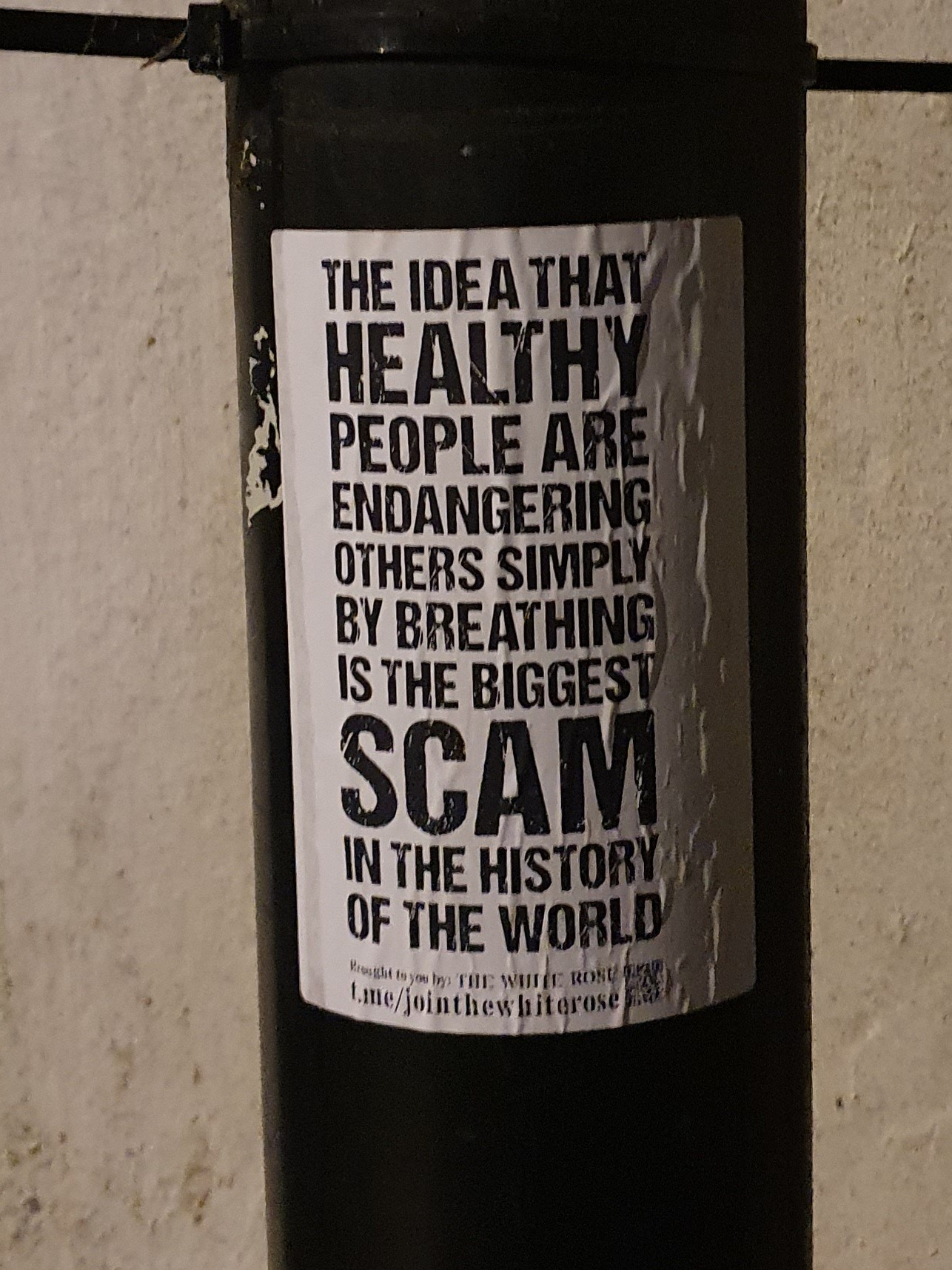
A White Rose sticker that disputes the existence of asymptomatic carriers, on a lamppost in Cornwall, UK, in February 2021

The White Rose is a group that runs a stickering campaign to distribute disinformation and conspiracy theories about the COVID-19 pandemic. Its name is an appropriation of that of the anti-Nazi White Rose group, to which it is unrelated. Stickers distributed by the group include anti-vaccine and anti-mask messages, denials that the COVID-19 pandemic exists, and conspiracy theories about a New World Order. Their tactics have been compared to those of the anti-immigration Hundred-Handers group.

The group is organized around a Telegram channel that is used to distribute templates for stickers, which followers print out using label printers and post in public places. The stickers in turn contain URLs which lead back to websites controlled by the group, drawing in new members in a feedback process. Other downloadable templates mimic the appearance of official documents and carry QR codes linking to websites controlled by the group.

The group primarily operates in the United Kingdom and the United States but also has local groups for Australia, Belgium, Germany, the Netherlands, New Zealand, Poland and Israel. In Australia some of their stickering activities have been directed at Jewish communities and include stickers bearing swastikas. By January 2022, their Telegram channel had nearly 60,000 members.

A variety of other conspiracy theories are associated with the group's Telegram chat, including links to sovereign citizen ideology and white supremacist groups, and antisemitic tropes about "powerful globalists".

In April 2021, a woman in Wythenshawe, England, was arrested on suspicion of criminal damage after posting White Rose stickers in the town's centre.
