= Del Bigtree =

American television producer and anti-vaccination activist

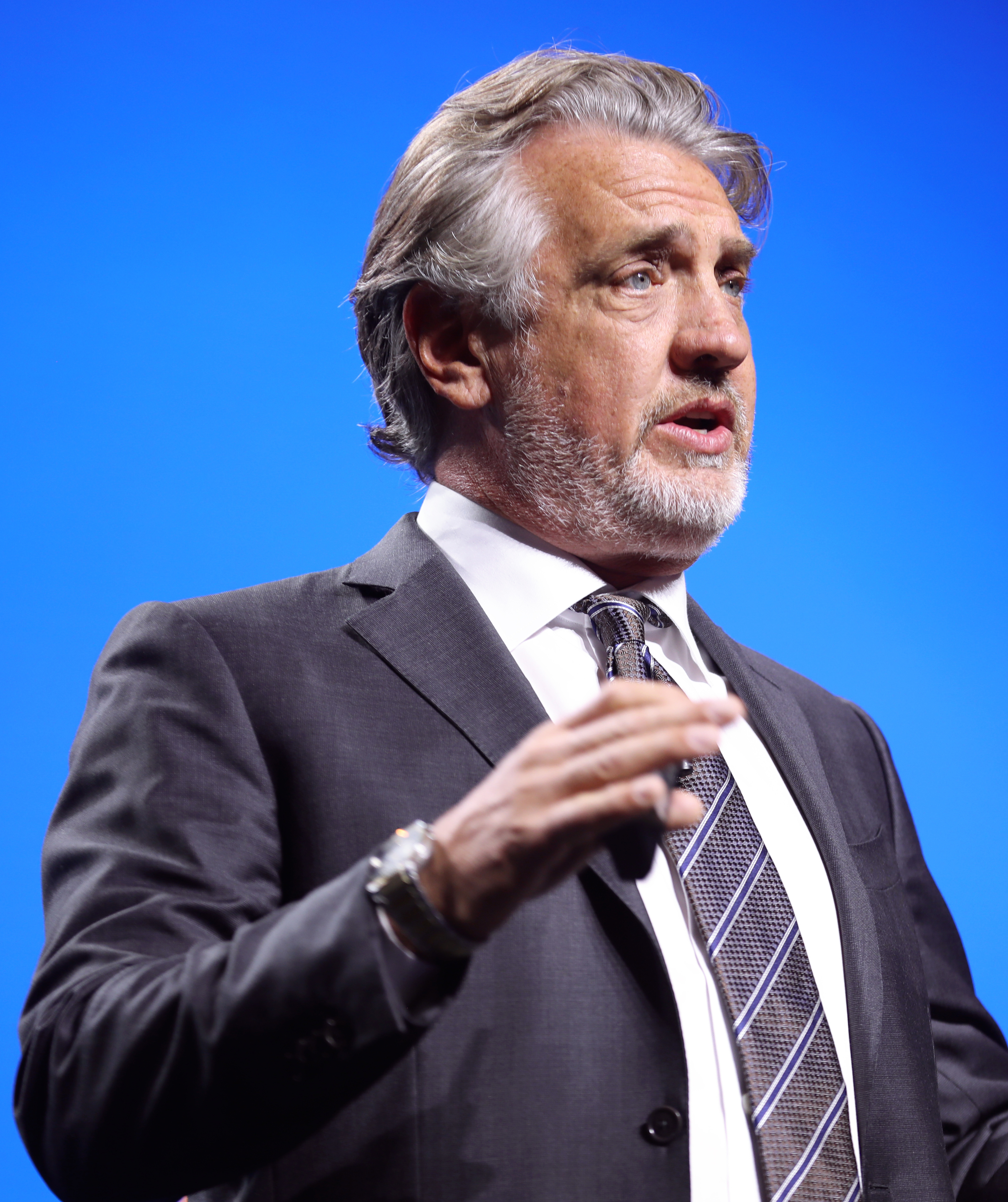
- Bigtree in 2024
- Born: Del Matthew Bigtree
- Occupations: Television producer; film producer; activist
- Years active: 2003–present
- Known for: Anti-vaccination activism
- Notable work: Vaxxed: From Cover-Up to Catastrophe
- Website: thehighwire.com

Del Matthew Bigtree is an American television and film producer who is the CEO of the anti-vaccination group Informed Consent Action Network. He produced the film Vaxxed: From Cover-Up to Catastrophe, based on the discredited opinions of Andrew Wakefield, and alleges an unsubstantiated connection between vaccines and autism. He was communications director for Robert F. Kennedy Jr.'s 2024 presidential campaign and subsequently took a leading role in two groups associated with Kennedy's political career.

His frequent public speaking engagements and an influx of funding in 2017 have made Bigtree, who has no medical training, one of the most prominent voices in the anti-vaccination movement. During the COVID-19 pandemic, Bigtree propagated conspiracy theories about the origin of SARS-CoV-2 and COVID-19 vaccines and urged his audience to ignore the advice of health authorities.

== Early career ==
Bigtree grew up in Boulder, Colorado, the son of Jack Groverland, a minister at the Unity of Boulder Church. He attended the Vancouver Film School and eventually worked in the television industry.

He briefly worked on Dr. Phil and was credited as a field producer for five episodes. After a gap of two years, he worked on the production team of the medical talk show The Doctors for which he produced 30 episodes over five years, although he has no medical training.

While he was working on The Doctors Bigtree learned of Andrew Wakefield's opposition to the MMR vaccine and his later-discredited claims that the Centers for Disease Control and Prevention (CDC) hid proof of a link between vaccines and autism. Wakefield was looking for help to produce a film based on his conspiracy theories. Bigtree decided he could assist and left the show to produce, write, and appear in Wakefield's film.

== Anti-vaccination activism ==
Bigtree produced the film Vaxxed: From Cover-Up to Catastrophe, based on the discredited views of Andrew Wakefield on an alleged connection between vaccines and autism. The film debuted in 2016 and was widely panned by critics. The epidemiologist W. Ian Lipkin wrote that "as a documentary it misrepresents what science knows about autism, undermines public confidence in the safety and efficacy of vaccines, and attacks the integrity of legitimate scientists and public-health officials."

However, the film, its promotional bus tour, and funding from the Selz Foundation quickly established Bigtree as an activist in the American anti-vaccination movement. He has since spoken at multiple anti-vaccine events in which he repeats false information about the risks of vaccines and alleges governments are engaged in a vast conspiracy to hide the truth. His anti-vaccine advocacy has been described by medical professionals as fearmongering.

When Bigtree developed an association with Wakefield, several states, including California, where Bigtree resided, had begun to consider legislation that would restrict the types of exemptions for which parents could apply to have their unvaccinated children attend schools. Bigtree strongly opposed such bills and has been criticized by the Anti-Defamation League and the Auschwitz-Birkenau Memorial and Museum for wearing a Star of David at an anti-vaccination event in an attempt to compare the treatment of those opposed to vaccination to the persecution of Jews. Often in collaboration with Wakefield and Robert F. Kennedy Jr., Bigtree still lobbies legislators to convince them to keep vaccination exemptions in place.

Bigtree is the chief executive of the anti-vaccination group Informed Consent Action Network (ICAN), for which he received a salary of $234,000 in 2023. Under his leadership, ICAN promotes the conspiracy theory that government officials collude with the pharmaceutical industry to cover up grievous harms from vaccines. Bigtree hosts a regular stream webcast in which he frequently repeats anti-vaccination messages. The webcast is produced by ICAN and often features Kennedy. Before it was shut down in 2020, the YouTube broadcast of The Highwire attracted 174,000 subscribers.

In New York State, in 2019, Bigtree was a keynote speaker at several anti-vaccination events targeting the ultra-Orthodox Jewish community in Brooklyn and in Rockland County during a measles epidemic fueled by low vaccination rates. Bigtree gave an anti-vaccine speech as headline speaker at a natural health products conference in Toronto in 2018, but a repeat performance was canceled in 2019 after The Globe and Mail started asking questions.

=== COVID-19 pandemic ===
Like other anti-vaccination advocates, Bigtree adapted several of the more popular anti-vaccination themes to the COVID-19 pandemic, promoting distrust in expertise, misrepresenting research results, and encouraging the public to let the disease run its course.

He used The Highwire webcast to propagate a number of conspiracy theories, such as one postulating that the virus responsible for COVID-19, SARS-CoV-2, had been made in a laboratory by the pharmaceutical industry. The weekly webcast quickly became a rallying point for anti-vaccination activists and conspiracy theorists early in the pandemic, according to Dorit Reiss, who studies online COVID-19 disinformation. Going against the advice of health authorities, Bigtree advised his viewers to refuse the vaccine when it is developed and to make efforts to actually infect themselves with the virus, favoring not so much herd immunity as natural selection, with weaker humans dying as the "sick get eaten by the wolves. That's how we've thrived." He accused Anthony Fauci of leading a cabal of conspirators that wanted to vaccinate the whole world population under false pretenses.

In July 2020, YouTube closed his account and channel for violation of its community standards against pandemic misinformation, and Facebook removed selected videos from Bigtree's account. As of June 2021, Bigtree's show The Highwire was still being distributed on Twitter. In August 2020, Bigtree announced that his videos were now distributed on Roku media players, despite the company's prohibition against content that is found to include "false, irrelevant or misleading information". He also found a receptive audience on Rumble, a video-sharing platform that does not have anti-misinformation policies. The Highwire website itself is attracting some one million visitors per month, making it one of the most popular alternative websites.

Bigtree regularly speaks at events protesting vaccination and public health measures against the pandemic. In October 2020, he speculated to an audience of anti-vaccination activists that the developing COVID-19 vaccines may cause diabetes, lupus, and other autoimmune diseases, although there was no evidence to support those claims. Bigtree spoke at the January 6, 2021, pro-Trump rally preceding the storming of the Capitol. He took this opportunity to attack federal health authorities and to contest the results of the 2020 United States presidential election. Other anti-vaccination activists were also present at this "Stop the Steal" rally, such as Ty and Charlene Bollinger. He was one of the main speakers at the Defeat the Mandates rally in Washington, D.C., on January 23, 2022, saying physicians and journalists should be convicted in Nuremberg-like trials.

By 2023, Bigtree was calling for the imprisonment of public health officials and executives of pharmaceutical companies for favoring vaccination against COVID-19 over the use of ineffective drugs such as hydroxychloroquine and ivermectin, alleging people have been murdered in order to further the agenda of sinister globalist interests.

Bigtree teamed up with Mikki Willis, the producer of the Plandemic conspiracy films, to exclusively stream the third Plandemic film on The Highwire.

== Robert F. Kennedy Jr.'s presidential campaign and MAHA ==
Bigtree provided fundraising assistance for the Robert F. Kennedy Jr. 2024 presidential campaign in 2023. Among other activities, he participated to an online event bringing together several prominent anti-vaccination activists, such as Mikki Willis, Sayer Ji, Charles Eisenstein, Sherri Tenpenny and Joseph Mercola. Bigtree is the sole managing member of KFP Consulting LLC, a firm established in May 2023. In July, the Kennedy campaign had paid $13,500 to KFP; by the end of Kennedy's campaign in 2024, that amount had reached $350,000, even though Bigtree still took in a $234,000 paycheck from ICAN in 2023.

In early January 2024, Bigtree replaced Stefanie Spear as communications director for the campaign. With Kennedy dropping out of the presidential contest and endorsing Trump in late August 2024, Bigtree ended up leading two new organizations linked to both Trump including the Kennedy: MAHA Alliance, a political action committee, and the related nonprofit MAHA Action. "MAHA" refers to the slogan Make America Healthy Again, Kennedy's variation on the Trump campaign's Make America Great Again.

== Filmography ==
Year	Title	Director	Writer	Producer	Notes
2003	Partners	Yes	No	No	Video short
2005	Bitter Sweet	Yes	Yes	Yes	TV movie. Also appears as an actor.
2007	Sex and Sensuality	Yes	No	Yes	Short film
2007-2008	Dr. Phil	Yes	No	No	5 episodes, field producer
2010-2015	The Doctors	No	No	Yes	30 episodes
2016	Vaxxed: From Cover-Up to Catastrophe	No	Yes	Yes	Anti-vaccination documentary

== See also ==
- COVID-19 misinformation
- Herd immunity
- Science Moms
- Vaccine hesitancy
