= Warnings About Vaccination Expectations NZ =

New Zealand anti-vaccination lobby group

- Abbreviation: WAVESnz
- Formation: 1988
- Purpose: Anti-vaccination campaigning and information
- Website: https://web.archive.org/web/20220215222629/https://wavesnz.org.nz/
- Formerly called: Immunisation Awareness Society (IAS)

Warnings About Vaccination Expectations NZ (WAVESnz), formerly the Immunisation Awareness Society (IAS), is a New Zealand anti-vaccination lobby group.

It was a registered charity until 3 September 2012, when the New Zealand Charities Registration Board determined that the Immunisation Awareness Society Incorporated was not qualified for registration as a charitable entity and that it was in the public interest that be removed from the Charities Register. The Board stated that "IAS disseminates information that is not factual and falls well short of acceptable standards in the area of health education."

== Activities ==
=== Campaign against the meningococcal vaccine ===
In the Early 2000s, the IAS was noted as spreading meningococcal misinformation based on fraudulent scientific studies. In 2004, during a meningococcal disease outbreak ISAM spokesperson Sue Claridge, made claims that the vaccine was not working or that "Health officials were also overstating the prevalence of the disease". In the same article, the Northland District Health Board, Medical Officer of Health, Dr Jonathan Jarman, stated these claims are "erroneous". By 2004, New Zealand was in the thirteenth year of an epidemic of meningococcal disease, a bacterial infection which can cause meningitis and blood poisoning. Most Western countries have fewer than three cases for every 100,000 people each year. With New Zealand averaging 1.5 before the epidemic started in 1991, by 2001, the worst year of the epidemic in the country, the rate hit 1.7. Five thousand four hundred New Zealanders had caught the disease, 220 had died, and 1080 had suffered serious disabilities, such as limb amputations or brain damage. Eight out of 10 victims were under 20 and half were under 5 years of age. The internationally low proportion of deaths from the disease had been credited to wide publicity of the disease and its symptoms. In June 2004, Charlotte Cleverley-Bisman became the face of the epidemic.

=== Campaign against the pertussis (whooping cough) vaccine ===
During a 2011 whooping cough epidemic, IAS spokeswoman Michelle Rudgley went on record in the Otago Daily Times with the statement "One day they are really going to have to accept that the pertussis whooping cough vaccine is useless and no matter how many boosters you have it is not going to stop the occurrence of whooping cough and the best bet is for parents to educate themselves on how to look after their children should they develop it". Evidence has shown that the acellular vaccine is 84% efficacious, and prevents 99.8% of infant hospital admissions after a completing a full course of three doses of the vaccine.

=== Actions against the New Zealand Measles Control Campaign 2009 ===
In July 2009, during a measles epidemic, IAS spokeswoman Michelle Rudgley said "the Canterbury situation proved the ineffectiveness of vaccines... parents had been deceived by the pro-vaccination lobby to believe immunization was safe and could totally protect their children against diseases". Independent data shows that measles causes the most preventable mortality of any disease, yet despite there being an effective vaccine, the researchers concluded that "30 to 40 million people worldwide still develop measles annually." The World Health Organization confirmed these concerns but noted that "during 2000-2018, measles vaccination prevented an estimated 23.2 million deaths [worldwide] making measles vaccine one of the best buys in public health." Before immunization in the United States between three and four million cases occurred each year, and the fatality rate is approximately 0.2% of those infected, most of those who are infected and who die are less than five years old.

=== Defense of Andrew Wakefield and Vaxxed ===
In 2017, the group promoted the anti-vaccination propaganda film, Vaxxed, produced by the discredited anti-vaccine activist Andrew Wakefield, the instigator of the Lancet MMR autism fraud. Paediatric Society President Dr David Newman: "it is taking a view that supports incorrect scientific principle. In fact, there is no link between MMR vaccine ... and autistic spectrum disorders". Ian Lipkin, professor of epidemiology and director of the Center for Infection and Immunity at the Columbia University Mailman School of Public Health, writing in The Wall Street Journal, said "If Vaxxed had been submitted as science fiction, it would merit attention for its storyline, character development and dialogue. But as a documentary it misrepresents what science knows about autism, undermines public confidence in the safety and efficacy of vaccines, and attacks the integrity of legitimate scientists and public-health officials".

=== Anti-vaccination Billboard ===
In October 2018, the group funded an anti-vaccine billboard that was raised in the Auckland suburb of Ōtāhuhu, close to Middlemore Hospital. Due to its misleading content, the billboard became "Most Complained About Ad" in 2018 and was removed by the advertising company within 24 hours. 145 Complaints were made to the Advertising Standards Authority which upheld the complaints with the authority ruling "the advertisement was misleading as the likely consumer takeout that vaccination is not safe was not sufficiently substantiated by the Advertiser, the advertisement unjustifiably played on fear and was socially irresponsible." While Immunisation Advisory Centre research director, Dr Helen Petousis-Harris said "the billboard perpetuated the myth there are concealed issues with what's in vaccines, which is most unhelpful and quite untrue".

=== Other activities ===
In 2019, an anti-vaccine midwife organization, Authentic Resistance, run by Waves spokesperson, Erin Hudson planned an event spreading anti-vaccine content a short distance from a hospital that was operating a measles ward during the NZ Measles epidemic. The measles outbreak then spread from New Zealand to Samoa and caused the 2019 Samoa measles outbreak which caused 5,700 cases and 83 deaths.

== Complaints, investigations and criticisms ==
IAS has been criticized by a number of scientists and medical professionals. This organization makes inaccurate claims contrary to scientific consensus, which says that vaccines are safe and effective. The group has been criticized for failing to fulfill their own stated mission of providing parents with material to make an informed decision. Instead, the group provided only anti-vaccination material, without the balance of pro-vaccination material that would be required for truly informed consent. In fact, it was this shortcoming that led the New Zealand Charities Registration Board to revoke IAS's charitable organisation status in September 2012, citing them for promoting a point of view rather than educating the public, as their charitable charter required.

Subsequent to its deregistration as a charity, the Society renamed itself WAVES NZ (Warnings About Vaccine Expectations).
