= EGullet =

eGullet is an internet message board for the restaurant community.

It is officially known as the eGullet Society for Culinary Arts & Letters.

It was founded in 2001 by Steven A. Shaw and Jason Perlow. In 2005, it received over 3 million page views per month and had more than 16,000 registered members.
