= Jane El-Dahr =

American immunologist

Jane Maroney El-Dahr is a clinical professor of pediatrics and the head of the division of pediatric allergy and immunology at Tulane University School of Medicine, where she has worked since 1990. She was the president of the Louisiana Society of Allergy, Asthma and Immunology. She specializes in the study of allergies, immunology, and rheumatology. El-Dahr has promoted discredited theories about the causes and treatments of autism (including falsely claiming that there is a causal link between vaccines and autism and falsely promoting chelation therapy as an effective autism treatment). She has co-authored papers with prominent anti-vaccine activists, including Andrew Wakefield.

== Education ==
El-Dahr attended Jefferson Medical College, completed both her residency and her fellowship at the University of Virginia Health Science Center, and completed an internship at Yale New Haven Hospital in 1986.

== Research ==
El-Dahr has primarily researched children's allergies to certain substances, such as corn and mold, and she has also researched respiratory conditions reported in areas impacted by Hurricane Katrina.

=== Pseudoscientific claims ===
==== Vaccines and autism ====
In 2001, El-Dahr gave a presentation before the Institute of Medicine, falsely suggesting a link between thimerosal (a preservative used in some vaccines) and autism. More specifically, she has argued that thimerosal causes autism through two separate mechanisms: direct neurotoxicity, and, more indirectly, by causing immune problems. In the 2006 book Understanding Autism for Dummies, El-Dahr falsely speculated that thimerosal in vaccines contributed to mercury poisoning and that autistic children were "canaries in the coal mine" due to an allegedly reduced capacity to eliminate it. In 2004, El-Dahr co-authored a paper that suggested a link between the MMR vaccine and autism, echoing fraudulent claims originally made in 1998 by anti-vaccine activist Andrew Wakefield. The paper's co-authors included Wakefield, Andrew Anthony (a pathologist who had previously provided Wakefield with patient data) and anti-vaccine activists Jeff Bradstreet, James B. Adams and Jerry Kartzinel. It is scientific consensus that there is no link, causal or otherwise, between vaccines (including those containing thimerosal) and autism.

==== Chelation therapy as a treatment for autism ====
In 2009, El-Dahr co-authored two papers with Adams, Bradstreet and others, falsely suggesting that chelation therapy was a safe and effective treatment for some autistic children. El-Dahr made similar claims in Understanding Autism for Dummies and provided a step-by-step guide for preparing a child for chelation. Chelation therapy has never been proven effective to treat autism and has sometimes resulted in death or other serious complications when improperly administered to autistic children.

== Personal life ==
El-Dahr has an autistic son, who was 15 years old in 2010. Her father was a general pediatrician, and often made house calls after picking her up from school while she sat in the car and did homework.
