= NeuroToxicology (journal) =

Peer-reviewed scientific journal

- Discipline: Toxicology, neuroscience, environmental health
- Language: English
- Edited by: Pamela J. Lein & Remco Westerink

Publication details
- History: 1979-present
- Publisher: Elsevier
- Frequency: Bimonthly
- Open access: Hybrid
- Impact factor: 3.9 (2024)

Standard abbreviations
- ISO 4: Neurotoxicology

Indexing
- CODEN: NRTXDN
- ISSN: 0161-813X
- OCLC no.: 47153737

Links
- Journal homepage; Online access

NeuroToxicology is a peer-reviewed scientific journal covering research on the toxicology of the nervous system. It was established in 1979 and originally published by Intox Press, until it was acquired by Elsevier in 2001. The editors-in-chief are Pamela J. Lein (University of California, Davis) and Remco Westerink (Utrecht University).

== Abstracting and indexing ==
The journal is abstracted and indexed in:

- Archives of Environmental Health
- BIOSIS Previews
- Chemical Abstracts
- Current Contents/Life Sciences
- EMBASE
- EMBiology
- Excerpta Medica
- Japanese Citation Index
- MEDLINE/PubMed
- Science Citation Index
- Scopus

According to the Journal Citation Reports, the journal has a 2024 impact factor of 3.9, ranking it 27th out of 106 journals in the category "Toxicology".
