= National League for Liberty in Vaccination =

The National League for Liberty in Vaccination (French: Ligue nationale pour la liberté des vaccinations) is a French anti-vaccine advocacy organization which opposes all government vaccine requirements. It was formed in 1954 to oppose tuberculosis vaccines. The organization denies the benefits of vaccinations while promoting misinformation about their dangers.

== History ==
The National League for Liberty in Vaccination (LNPLV) was founded in 1954 by Marcel Lemaire, who fined for refusing BCG vaccination for his child in 1952. It merged three groups that opposed mandatory BCG vaccination: the Health and Freedom League, founded in 1948 by Jules Tissot; the Association of Parents of Vaccination Victims; and members of the La Vie claire movement, led by Henri-Charles Geffroy. Its name is a reference to the Universal League of Antivaccinators (or the International League of Antivaccinators), founded by the Belgian ophthalmologist Hubert Boëns (1825-1898) in 1880. That group advocated against smallpox vaccinations in France and held international congresses in Cologne in 1881 and Charleroi in 1885.

The association is also involved with advocacy for other movements like fasting, vegetarianism, and Freinet pedagogy. It published the magazine Vaccination or Health until 1966.

== Bibliography ==
- Anne-Marie Moulin; Jolanta Skomska-Godefroy (1996). "XXXI: La résistance contemporaine à la vaccination : le cas français". L'Aventure de la vaccination [The Adventure of Immunization: thinking about medicine]. Penser la médecine (in French). Paris: Fayard. ISBN 2-213-59412-0..
