= Jeff Bradstreet =

American physician (1954–2015)

- Born: July 6, 1954
- Died: June 19, 2015 (aged 60); Rutherford County, North Carolina
- Education: University of South Florida
- Known for: Alternative autism therapies Autism-related pseudoscience Anti-vaccine activism

James Jeffrey "Jeff" Bradstreet (July 6, 1954 – June 19, 2015) was an American doctor, alternative medicine practitioner and preacher, who ran the International Child Development Resource Center (ICDRC) in Melbourne, Florida, as well as homeopathic medical practices in Buford, Georgia and Arizona. He also founded the Good News Doctor Foundation (GNDF), which aimed to combine Christian beliefs with medicine. Bradstreet was best known for promoting the false claim that vaccines cause autism, as well as various discredited or unproven alternative treatments for autism.

== Education and career ==
Bradstreet obtained a Florida medical license in 1984. He received a Bachelor of Science degree from the University of South Florida in 1976, where he also went to medical school beginning three years later. His postgraduate research focused on aerospace medicine, and he received his training in this field from Wilford Hall Medical Center. He was an adjunct professor of child development and neuroscience at the Southwest College of Naturopathic Medicine in Tempe, Arizona.

== Pseudoscientific autism-related claims and treatments ==
In 2003 and 2004, Bradstreet co-authored papers that suggested a causal relationship between vaccines and autism. These papers were published in the fringe partisan Journal of American Physicians and Surgeons, which is not indexed by PubMed. Bradstreet and his co-authors claimed that autistic children had a higher body burden of mercury, and that three autistic children had measles RNA in their cerebrospinal fluid. It is scientific consensus that there is no link, causal or otherwise, between vaccines and autism.

Beginning in 2000, Bradstreet treated autistic child Colten Snyder (one of the test cases in the Omnibus Autism Proceeding) with chelation therapy, hoping to remove excess mercury from his body, in spite of the fact that hair, blood, and urine tests had failed to show he exhibited abnormal levels of mercury. Over an eight-year period, Snyder visited Bradstreet's office 160 times. Quackwatch founder Stephen Barrett stated, "It appears to me that Bradstreet decides which of his nonstandard theories to apply and records diagnoses that embody them." Barrett also labeled the tests used by Bradstreet to search for excess mercury in the body "phony." Pediatrician Peter Hotez characterized Bradstreet's proposal to treat autism with chelation therapy as "dangerous." Chelation therapy has never been proven effective to treat autism and has sometimes resulted in death or other serious complications when improperly administered to autistic children.

After losing his job in December 2001, prominent anti-vaccine activist and fraudster Andrew Wakefield became research director at Bradstreet's ICDRC; his name also appeared alongside Bradstreet's on ICDRC educational materials promoting various alternative autism treatments (including secretin, colostrum, and several branded dietary supplements). Wakefield's lawyers released a statement in 2005 in which he claimed he had never been paid by or entered into any contractual agreement with the ICDRC. The ICDRC and GNDF were projects of the same Florida-based nonprofit corporation (employer identification number 59-3473087). While testifying in court on the Snyder matter in 2007, Bradstreet described the corporation as being "designed to raise health awareness, [promote] personal responsibility for health care, and fund care for the needy." Bradstreet also said the corporation had raised "hundreds of thousands of dollars" to pay for patients' supplement treatments and durable medical equipment. The Internal Revenue Service automatically revoked the corporation's 501(c)(3) status in February 2015 for failure to file three consecutive tax returns. The corporation was administratively dissolved by the state in September 2016 for failure to file an annual report. As recently as 2023, Quackwatch's Barrett has included the ICDRC and GNDF on a list of past and present organizations he views "with considerable distrust."

In a 2009 interview with the Chicago Tribune, Bradstreet promoted the use of intravenous immunoglobulin (IVIG) to treat autistic children, saying, "Every kid with autism should have a trial of IVIG if money was not an option [sic] and IVIG was abundant." He stated that he had been administering the treatment to patients for 10 years and that only 10 percent had experienced minor side effects, such as short-term headaches and fevers. Bradstreet also claimed he had extensively discussed the controversial treatment with Diana Vargas, the co-author of a 2005 paper that found markers of neuroinflammation in the brains of autistic accident victims. However, Vargas denied ever having had such a discussion and concurred with two of her co-authors that the paper did not suggest IVIG would be an appropriate treatment for autistic patients. One of those co-authors, Andrew Zimmerman, stated that neuroinflammation might actually be a sign the brain was attempting to heal itself, and using IVIG to interfere with the body's natural immune response could be harmful. In 2006, the American Academy of Allergy, Asthma & Immunology concluded that IVIG was unlikely to benefit autistic people, and, in 2007, a panel of Canadian experts recommended against its use as an autism treatment.

In 2010 and 2012, Bradstreet co-authored two research papers regarding the use of hyperbaric oxygen therapy (HBOT) to treat autism, the first of which found no difference between HBOT and placebo and the second of which labeled HBOT a "safe and potentially effective treatment". In 2016, researcher Tao Xiong and colleagues released a meta-analysis of randomized controlled trials that included autistic participants (including Bradstreet's 2010 and 2012 studies). The paper concluded there was insufficient proof HBOT benefited autistic patients and suggested continued research was likely futile and potentially injurious to participants. In 2019, the United States Food and Drug Administration (FDA) included HBOT on a list of alternative autism treatments the agency considered "deceptive and misleading" and "potentially dangerous". In 2022, the United Kingdom's National Health Service (NHS) included HBOT on a list of alternative autism treatments that had not been demonstrated effective and were not recommended by the agency.

In 2006, Bradstreet co-authored a paper that argued autistic children had an increased vulnerability to oxidative stress.

In 2012, Bradstreet promoted the use of the protein GcMAF to treat autistic children, claiming to have administered the controversial and unapproved treatment to 600 of his own patients. In a 2014 paper, Bradstreet and his co-authors suggested an alleged abnormal gene expression in autistic children involving the endocannabinoid system could be corrected with GcMAF and that more studies should be conducted to confirm their findings. In 2022, the NHS included GcMAF on a list of alternative autism treatments it labeled "fake" or potentially harmful.

In a magazine column published by anti-vaccine organization AutismOne, Bradstreet labeled stem-cell therapy an "unproven but enticing therapeutic option" for autism. In a 2014 research paper, Bradstreet and his co-authors described a study they had conducted involving the injection of fetal stem cells into the abdomens of 45 autistic children, claiming it had preliminarily demonstrated "the safety and efficacy" of the treatment. As of 2025, stem-cell therapy has not been proven effective to treat autism.

== Personal life and death ==
Bradstreet was found dead from a gunshot wound to the chest in the Broad River in Rutherford County, North Carolina in June 2015, after his Buford, Georgia medical office was raided by the FDA in connection with an investigation into GcMAF treatments. At the time of his death, he lived in Braselton and ran his medical practice in Buford. While the police declared Bradstreet's death a suicide, a conspiracy theory spread holding that Bradstreet was murdered for his use of a "holistic" therapy.

Bradstreet's son has been diagnosed with autism, which Bradstreet attributed to a vaccination his son received at 15 months of age. Among the discredited autism therapies Bradstreet treated him with were secretin and IVIG.

== Selected publications ==
- Siniscalco, D.; Sapone, A.; Giordano, C.; Cirillo, A.; Magistris, L.; Rossi, F.; Fasano, A.; Bradstreet, J. J.; Maione, S.; Antonucci, N. (2013). "Cannabinoid Receptor Type 2, but not Type 1, is Up-Regulated in Peripheral Blood Mononuclear Cells of Children Affected by Autistic Disorders". Journal of Autism and Developmental Disorders. 43 (11): 2686–95. doi:10.1007/s10803-013-1824-9. PMID 23585028. S2CID 4849916.
- Siniscalco, D.; Bradstreet, J. J.; Antonucci, N. (2013). "Therapeutic Role of Hematopoietic Stem Cells in Autism Spectrum Disorder-Related Inflammation". Frontiers in Immunology. 4: 140. doi:10.3389/fimmu.2013.00140. PMC 3677147. PMID 23772227.
- Adams, J. B.; Baral, M.; Geis, E.; Mitchell, J.; Ingram, J.; Hensley, A.; Zappia, I.; Newmark, S.; Gehn, E.; Rubin, R. A.; Mitchell, K.; Bradstreet, J.; El-Dahr, J. (2009). "Safety and efficacy of oral DMSA therapy for children with autism spectrum disorders: Part A - Medical results". BMC Clinical Pharmacology. 9 16. doi:10.1186/1472-6904-9-16. PMC 2774660. PMID 19852789.
- Bradstreet, JJ; Dahr, JE (2004). "Detection of Measles Virus Genomic RNA in Cerebrospinal Fluid of Three Children with Regressive Autism: a Report of Three Cases" (PDF). Journal of American Physicians and Surgeons. 9 (2). Association of American Physicians and Surgeons: 38–45. Archived from the original (PDF) on October 20, 2013.
