= Insulin autoimmune syndrome =

Autoimmune disease

Insulin autoimmune syndrome (IAS), a rare cause of reversible autoimmune hypoglycemia also known as Hirata's disease, was first described by Hirata in Japan in 1970.

== Signs and symptoms ==
Affected patients are usually adults, experiencing multiple episodes of spontaneous hypoglycemia with neuroglycopenic symptoms.

== Causes ==
The cause of IAS is not clearly understood. However, interaction of disulfide bond in the insulin molecule with sulfhydryl group drugs such as methimazole, carbimazole, captopril, isoniazid, hydralazine, imipenem, and also with lipoic acid has been suggested. Drug-induced autoimmunization is evidenced by insulin autoantibodies appearing a few weeks after the intake of drug containing the sulfhydryl group. Additionally, IAS has a significant genetic predisposition as its association with specific HLA class has been observed.

== Pathophysiology ==
Following a meal, glucose concentration in the bloodstream rises, providing a stimulus for insulin secretion. Autoantibodies bind to these insulin molecules, rendering them unable to exert their effects. The resultant hyperglycemia promotes further insulin release. As glucose concentration eventually falls, insulin secretion also subsides, and the total insulin level decreases. Now insulin molecules spontaneously dissociate from the autoantibodies, giving rise to a raised free insulin level inappropriate for the glucose concentration, causing hypoglycemia.

== Diagnosis ==
Usual presenting features are multiple episodes of spontaneous hypoglycemia and appearance of insulin autoantibodies without prior history of administration of exogenous insulin. The insulin level is significantly high, usually up to 100 mIU/L, C-peptide level is markedly elevated, and insulin antibodies are positive.

== Treatment ==
The best known treatment is recommending frequent, small meals and to avoid simple sugars. Sulfhydryl group-containing drugs should be avoided and steroids can be used in resistant cases.
