= International Automated Systems =

International Automated Systems, Inc. (IAS or IAUS) is a company with research and development in various industries, that has been involved in many ventures to design, produce, market, and sell high-technology products. It has been publicly traded since 1988, as an over-the-counter stock (stock symbol IAUS.PK). The founder and major shareholder is Neldon Johnson. It is currently based in Salem, Utah, United States, where it was founded in 1987.

Starting in 2013, IAUS came under fire for questionable claims and practices related to a solar power project. In 2018 IAUS was found guilty of multiple counts of fraud. The company, and Johnson, were ordered to pay $50 million in fines and penalties.

== Products ==
=== Solar Power ===
Since 2004, International Automated Systems has put most of its efforts into developing a solar powered electricity generating system, based on solar heat collected by patented lenses and focused on a heat receiving system. This heat is then used to generate steam, which turns patented 'blade-less' turbines, and generates electricity. Prototypes of this system have been demonstrated at several locations. A fully functional electricity generation system has been under construction since 2005 in Delta, Utah.

In 2018, IAUS was found guilty of operating an elaborate fraud scheme. The company's "solar lens" products were found to not produce any electricity, and were marketed mainly as a method to obtain tax credits. Judge David Nuffer wrote: that Neldon Johnson and his associates "knew or had reason to know that their statements about tax benefits purportedly related to buying the solar lenses were false or fraudulent."

=== Automated Retail ===
Some of the products or potential products of International Automated Systems include an automated retail self-service checkout system and management software for retail establishments. A demonstration project for this was a grocery store called U-Check that was built and run in Salem, Utah. Portions of International Automated Systems' technology have been licensed to Optimal Robotics for an undisclosed amount of money. However, Optimal Robotics Corporation previously had designed and implemented their own self-check out system, which they reported to have developed completely independently of International Automated Systems. A press release by Optimal Robotics on January 24, 2004, states: "Optimal Robotics Corp. (NASDAQ: OPMR), today announced that it has entered into a settlement agreement with International Automated Systems, Inc. (IAS), which brings to a close the patent lawsuit between the parties. In accordance with the agreement, IAS will receive a sum that is not considered to be material to Optimal."

=== Biometrics and Fingerprint Identification ===
International Automated Systems developed a biometric device consisting of an automated fingerprint reader (AFIM = Automated Fingerprint Identification Machine) that was able to read a person's fingerprint, then use that information to create a specific, personalized code number, which could be stored in a small amount of digital space, such as on the magnetic strip of a credit card. People could then use other AFIM fingerprint scanners to identify themselves and purchase items or obtain access to controlled locations and devices in a secured way.

=== Other Products ===
The company currently is developing or has developed or partially developed products for airport security systems; automated restaurant systems; 'bladeless' turbines for electrical power generation; and solar technology systems for production of electricity and gasoline.
