= Jason Perlow =

Jason Perlow is an American technology and food blogger, and a Linux expert. Since 2008 he has written for ZDNet, where he is a Senior Contributing Writer. He has also contributed to CNN Underscored, writing kitchen product and consumer technology reviews.

== Background ==
Perlow spent ten years as a technology consultant for Bankers Trust, Canon, and Sharp Electronics.

He was a Senior Technical Editor for PalmPower Magazine and Windows CE Power Magazine, a writer for Sm@rtReseller Magazine, and was a Senior Technology Editor for Linux Magazine.

Perlow was the Editorial Director of the Linux Foundation between February 2020 and December 2023. Perlow was an Advisory Architect for IBM Global Technology Services' Server Optimization and Datacenter Relocation practice from September 2007 to December 2012. He worked for Microsoft in their Small to Mid-Market Solutions & Partners division (SMS&P) as a Technical Solution Professional and Partner Technology Advisor focusing on providing solutions for Cloud hosting providers from December 2012 to August 2017.. From 2017 to 2020, he held Technical Architect and Threat Researcher positions at Dimension Data and Proofpoint, Inc.

== Foodie ==
Perlow founded the eGullet food discussion community along with food writer Steven Shaw in August 2001 and was its sole financial supporter, proprietor, and technologist. In 2004, he gave up his financial interest in the company. It became the eGullet Society for Culinary Arts and Letters, a 501(c)(3) nonprofit charity, and he joined its Board of Directors.

In February 2006, Perlow founded his personal foodie blog, Off The Broiler.

In April 2006, Perlow left eGullet and its board of directors to concentrate on Off The Broiler full-time. In 2007, Perlow decided to change his foodie lifestyle, a change which was chronicled by The New York Times.

Perlow was featured in a 2010 episode of Anthony Bourdain: No Reservations, about the formation of eGullet.

Perlow currently lives in South Florida and is active in the area's restaurant community with his "Foodies Who Review South Florida" Facebook group and his restaurant reviews at TAP Into Coral Springs.
