= Hundred-Handers (group) =

International far right anti-immigration nationalist group

The Hundred-Handers are a British far-right anti-immigration group. The group are known to put up posters and stickers promoting alt-right nationalism. Their stickers have also appeared in Canada.

== History ==
The group was first reported in May 2018, according to TRT World. They are named after the Hecatoncheires (lit. 'hundred-handed ones') of Greek mythology who helped Zeus and the Olympians overthrow the Titans in a war that would decide who has dominion over the universe.

In January 2020, fake Extinction Rebellion posters were reported in Brighton. These included: 'Stop white genocide', 'House the world, destroy the environment' and 'population control in the third world'. A member of Extinction Rebellion Brighton said the posters were "against everything we stand for". In March 2020, further such stickers appeared in Bedford. In September 2020, stickers with racist slogans and linked to the Hundred Handers appeared in the Crookes area of Sheffield. Stickers were also reported in Scotland.

In June 2020, it was reported that the group had put up messages in Canada, such as: "Never apologise for being white," and "There is a war on whites" and "It's okay to be white."

In December 2020, a Ministry of Defence memo to army units, concerned about the possibility of military sites being targeted, warned that the group had been concealing razor blades beneath some of their stickers.

In 2021, Hampshire Police increased patrols and examined CCTV footage in response to the Hundred-Handers posting anti-immigrant, White power stickers in the town of Romsey, including some that read "White ~~Privilege~~ Excellence."

In March 2024, the head of the organisation's Telegram Messenger group was sentenced to two years in prison for racially-aggravated criminal damage and inciting racial hatred.
