= Vaxxed =

2016 anti-vaccination documentary film

- Film poster
- Directed by: Andrew Wakefield
- Written by: Andrew Wakefield; Del Bigtree
- Produced by: Del Bigtree
- Distributed by: Cinema Libre Studio
- Release date: April 1, 2016
- Running time: 91 minutes
- Country: United States
- Language: English

Vaxxed: From Cover-Up to Catastrophe is a 2016 American pseudoscience propaganda film alleging a cover-up by the Centers for Disease Control and Prevention (CDC) of a purported link between the MMR vaccine and autism. According to Variety, the film "purports to investigate the claims of a senior scientist at the U.S. Centers for Disease Control and Prevention who revealed that the CDC had allegedly manipulated and destroyed data on an important study about autism and the MMR vaccine". Critics derided Vaxxed as an anti-vaccine propaganda film.

The film received overwhelmingly negative reviews from academics and critics. The film was directed by discredited anti-vaccine activist Andrew Wakefield, who was struck off the medical register in the United Kingdom in 2010 due to ethical violations related to his fraudulent research into the role of vaccines in autism. It was scheduled to premiere at the 2016 Tribeca Film Festival but was withdrawn by the festival. In reviewing the film, Indiewire said that "Wakefield doesn't just have a dog in this fight; he is the dog". In November 2019, a sequel, Vaxxed II: The People's Truth, was released.

== Background ==
In 1998, Wakefield and 12 other authors published a fraudulent study in The Lancet in which he falsely claimed that the MMR vaccine caused autism. In 2010, the study was retracted, and Wakefield was struck off the medical register in the United Kingdom due to "ethical violations and a failure to disclose financial conflicts of interest" and for his invention of evidence linking the MMR vaccine to autism. A substantial body of subsequent research has established that there is no link between the MMR vaccine and autism. Wakefield went on to become a leader in the anti-vaccination movement that his discredited study helped create.

Del Bigtree, a producer of Vaxxed, was formerly a producer of The Doctors, an American medical advice talk show. The British Medical Journal conducted a study on The Doctors and The Dr. Oz Show and concluded with this warning about the shows: "Consumers should be skeptical about any recommendations provided ... as details are limited and only a third to one half of recommendations are based on believable or somewhat believable evidence". As with all American medical programmes and medical teleshopping shows, the two programmes carry Food and Drug Administration-required mandatory disclaimers at the end of each episode which state their advice is not a medical endorsement and viewers should consult with a physician based on the advice given.

The film was produced by Autism Media Channel, of which Wakefield is a director.

== Narrative ==
CDC Info Statement for MMR Vaccine, 2012, which is challenged in the film.

According to Variety, the film "purports to investigate the claims of a senior scientist at the U.S. Centers for Disease Control and Prevention who revealed that the CDC had allegedly manipulated and destroyed data on an important study about autism and the MMR vaccine." The film features the so-called "CDC whistleblower" narrative that is based on anti-vaccination activist and associate professor Brian Hooker's paper describing claims by senior CDC scientist William Thompson that he and his co-authors had omitted mention of a correlation they found between vaccination and autism in African-American boys in a CDC study. However, a 2011 IOM report showed that evidence favors rejection of a relationship between the MMR vaccine and autism. The film contains edited excerpts of several phone calls between Hooker and Thompson recorded without Thompson's knowledge. Hooker's 2014 paper on the narrative was subsequently retracted due to "serious concerns about the validity of its conclusions" and in 2015 the CDC had confirmed that any such initial correlation had ceased to exist once they performed a more in-depth analysis of the children in the study.

These sometimes spliced-together unauthorized phone recordings of Thompson, according to the Houston Press, form the "crux of the entire movie ... And ... that's it". On the "CDC whistleblower" narrative, Philip LaRussa, a professor of paediatric medicine at Columbia University Medical Center, said the film-makers "were saying, there's this silver bullet here, and the CDC is hiding it, and no one else has looked at this issue, which is not the case". Thompson does not appear in the film and did not see it before it was released. Thompson had released a statement on the controversy in 2014 which the New York Times discussed in its coverage of Vaxxed; the Times described it as "saying that while he questioned the 2004 study's presentation of some data, he would never advise people not to get vaccinated."

== Premiere and distribution ==
The film had been scheduled to premiere at the 2016 Tribeca Film Festival but this was the subject of public outcry and widespread criticism, particularly for allowing Wakefield to distribute his discredited theories. Actor Robert De Niro, who co-founded the festival, initially defended the decision to show the film, writing on Facebook that the film was "very personal" to him due to him having an autistic child, and saying that he hoped the film would open a dialog about the controversy. However, shortly before the evening of March 26, De Niro announced that the film would not screen, stating that consultation with other film festival representatives and members of the scientific community had led him to conclude that screening the film would not contribute to or further the discussion of the topic presented. While appearing on NBC's Today the following month, De Niro expressed regret that he had agreed to exclude the film and stated, "I think the movie is something that people should see." During the appearance, De Niro also promoted the 2014 anti-vaccination film Trace Amounts and stated that he believed there was a link between vaccines and autism.

After the film was dropped from the Tribeca Film Festival, it was picked up for distribution by Cinema Libre. The film premiered at the Angelika Film Center in New York City on April 1, 2016 to an audience of "a few dozen".

In reaction to Cinema Libre's decision to distribute the film, Todd Drezner, the father of an autistic son and creator of a neurodiversity-themed movie that was distributed by Cinema Libre, wrote an open letter to Cinema Libre criticizing Vaxxed and Cinema Libre's decision to distribute it, writing: "By releasing Vaxxed, Cinema Libre is actively harming thousands of autistic people. While we should be discussing ways to best support autistic people and help them lead fulfilling lives, you would instead have us follow a discredited scientist and dishonest filmmaker down a rabbit hole that leads only to long-debunked conspiracy theories. I am profoundly disappointed."

The film was given a private screening in Cannes in 2017 while the Cannes Film Festival was underway, and at that time Cinema Libre said that it had earned $1.2 million and that they had signed distribution deals in Italy, Germany, Poland, and China.

== Reception ==
On the review aggregation website Rotten Tomatoes, the film has an approval rating of 38% based on 13 reviews, and an average rating of 4.3/10.

In his film debut, Wakefield has cast himself as the victim of a massive conspiracy to hide the truth ... What drove Wakefield from being a respected researcher to a conspiracy theorist?

— Paul Offit in The Hollywood Reporter.

Documentary director Penny Lane stated, "This film is not some sort of disinterested investigation into the 'vaccines cause autism' hoax; this film is directed by the person who perpetuated the hoax."

A review by Ed Cara from the health and science news-site Medical Daily states that "[Vaxxed] doesn't care about convincing its audience with evidence. Instead, Wakefield, Hooker, and producer Del Bigtree run the viewer through a well-trod gauntlet of emotional pleas, context-free statistics ... and shadowy conspiracies." Eric Kohn from an independent film news-site Indiewire says: "Wakefield's by-the-numbers approach to didactic storytelling relies on tons of random factoids positioned out of context to drive home his agenda."

Joe Leydon, a film critic from Variety magazine. describes the film as a "slickly produced but scientifically dubious hodgepodge of free-floating paranoia" and warns of its "anti-Big Pharma conspiracy mongering." Mick LaSalle of the San Francisco Chronicle wrote:

The vast majority of people who see this film will not have the scientific knowledge to assess the film's veracity. But it's fair to say that the documentary, though characterized as antivaccination, isn't quite that. The point of view is more nuanced. It's against the vaccination of children ages 2 and younger. And it's particularly against the MMR — that is, the giving of three vaccines at once ... it's a passionate advocate for its viewpoint, and that makes for compelling viewing. ... Of course, it's possible that the children would have developed autism anyway, and that one event didn't cause the other. But the parents presented here are convinced otherwise.

Pete Vonder Haar of Houston Press described the film as a "tragic fraud." Sarah Gill of The Age called the film "another desperate attempt to hoodwink the public for no greater purpose than making money."

== Sequels ==
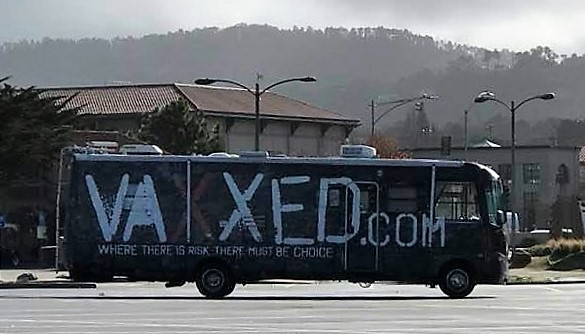
Vaxxed bus - Monterey, California, 2020

In November 2019, Vaxxed II: The People's Truth, produced by Robert F. Kennedy Jr., was released in the US. The core of the film is video of individuals telling their stories to those who drove the Vaxxed promotional bus across the US in 2016. Of the film, Newsweek stated that it "touts the myth that there is a 'vaccine injury epidemic'" and that the "trailer features distressing footage of parents making anecdotal and unfounded claims that vaccines caused their children to have developmental problems, including autism." The Guardian stated that "The film makes no effort to address the scientific evidence that the parents' experiences of autism in their children have nothing to do with vaccines, or the coincidence that symptoms of autism often appear between 12 and 24 months of age, exactly when the measles, mumps and rubella (MMR) vaccine is given."

A 2024 video production named Vaxxed III: Authorized To Kill was released in September 2024, produced not by Kennedy himself, but the video production arm of his organization Children's Health Defense. It presents testimonies of people who were allegedly injured following being vaccinated during the COVID-19 pandemic.

== See also ==
- Big Pharma conspiracy theory
- Science Moms
- Vaccine adverse event
- Vaccine hesitancy
