= Andrew Wakefield =

British former doctor (born 1956)

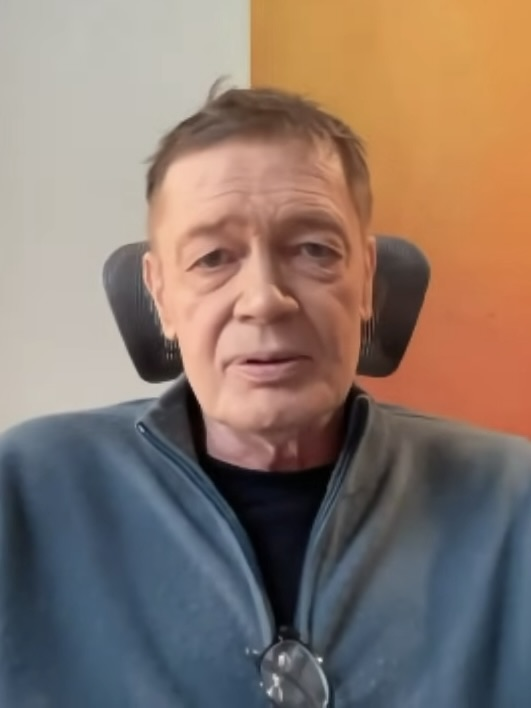
- Wakefield in 2026
- Born: Andrew Jeremy Wakefield; 3 September 1956 (age 70); Taplow, Buckinghamshire, England
- Education: King Edward's School, Bath
- Alma mater: St Mary's Hospital Medical School, London
- Occupations: Former physician, anti-vaccination activist
- Known for: Wakefield MMR-autism fraud
- Spouse: Carmel O'Donovan (m 1978, div 2017)
- Partner: Elle Macpherson (2017–2019)
- Children: 4

Andrew Jeremy Wakefield (born 3 September 1956 (Note: Some sources state 1957.)) is an English fraudster and anti-vaccine activist. Formerly a senior surgeon, he was struck off the British medical register in 2010 for "serious professional misconduct" due to his involvement in the fraudulent 1998 Lancet MMR autism report, which falsely claimed a link between the measles, mumps and rubella (MMR) vaccine and autism.

The publicity surrounding the study caused a sharp decline in vaccination uptake, leading to a number of outbreaks of measles around the world and many deaths as a result. He was a surgeon on the liver transplant programme at the Royal Free Hospital in London, and became a senior lecturer and honorary consultant in experimental gastroenterology at the Royal Free and University College School of Medicine. He resigned from his positions there in 2001 "by mutual agreement", then moved to the United States. In 2004 he co-founded and began working at the Thoughtful House research centre (later renamed the Johnson Center for Child Health and Development) in Austin, Texas. He served as executive director of the centre until February 2010, when he resigned in the wake of findings against him by the British General Medical Council (GMC), which had struck him off their register. He has subsequently become known for his anti-vaccination activism.

Wakefield published his 1998 paper on autism in the British medical journal The Lancet, claiming to have identified a novel form of enterocolitis linked to autism. However, other researchers were unable to reproduce his findings, and a 2004 investigation by The Sunday Times reporter Brian Deer identified undisclosed financial conflicts of interest on Wakefield's part. Wakefield reportedly stood to earn up to US$43 million per year selling test kits. Most of Wakefield's co-authors then withdrew their support for the study's interpretations, and the GMC conducted an inquiry into allegations of misconduct against Wakefield and two former colleagues, focusing on Deer's findings.

In 2010 the GMC found that Wakefield had been dishonest in his research, had acted against patients' best interests, had mistreated developmentally delayed children and had "failed in his duties as a responsible consultant". The Lancet fully retracted Wakefield's 1998 publication on the basis of the GMC's findings, noting that elements of the manuscript had been falsified and that the journal had been "deceived" by Wakefield. Three months later, Wakefield was struck off the UK medical register, in part for his deliberate falsification of research published in The Lancet. In a related legal decision, a British court held that "[t]here is now no respectable body of opinion which supports [Wakefield's] hypothesis, that MMR vaccine and autism/enterocolitis are causally linked".

In 2016 Wakefield directed the anti-vaccination film Vaxxed: From Cover-Up to Catastrophe.

== Early life and education ==
Andrew Jeremy Wakefield was born on 3 September 1956 to Graham Wakefield, a neurologist, and Bridget d'Estouteville Matthews, a general practitioner, at the Canadian Red Cross Memorial Hospital in Taplow, Buckinghamshire, England.

As a day pupil at the independent King Edward's School, Bath, he was captain of his local rugby team. After leaving King Edward's School, Wakefield attended sixth form at Kingswood School Bath before going on to study medicine at St Mary's Hospital Medical School (now Imperial College School of Medicine), fully qualifying in 1981. He became a Fellow of the Royal College of Surgeons in 1985.

== Career ==
At the University of Toronto from 1986 to 1989, he was a member of a team that studied tissue rejection problems with small intestine transplantation, using animal models. He continued his studies of small intestine transplantation under a Wellcome Trust travelling fellowship at University of Toronto in Canada.

In the late 1980s, Wakefield returned to the UK to focus on research. He joined the Royal Free Hospital in London in the 1990s and remained there until his resignation in 2001. He was part of a team at the Royal working on inflammatory bowel disease from 1995 to 1998.

Following his resignation from Royal Free, Wakefield moved to the United States, where he co-founded the Thoughtful House research centre in Austin, Texas. He served as the executive director of Thoughtful House, which studies autism, and continued to promote the theory of a link between the MMR vaccine and autism, despite admitting it was "not proved."

In February 2010, Wakefield resigned as the executive director of Thoughtful House after the British General Medical Council (GMC) concluded that he had engaged in unethical and dishonest conduct during his research. The GMC found that he had been "dishonest and irresponsible" in conducting his earlier autism research in England.

The Times reported in May 2010 that he was a medical advisor for Visceral, a UK charity that "researches bowel disease and developmental disorders".

Wakefield has set up the non-profit Strategic Autism Initiative to commission studies into the condition, and in 2013 was listed as a director of a company called Medical Interventions for Autism and another called the Autism Media Channel.

Although Wakefield was initially supported by Donald Trump, who appeared with him in inauguration photos, the emergence of a measles epidemic led Trump to reconsider his stance. Subsequently, social media platforms provided Wakefield with a fresh avenue to promote his anti-vaccination campaign, resulting in global repercussions, despite the fact that he has never directly treated a patient.

Wakefield directed the anti-vaccination film "Vaxxed: From Cover-Up to Catastrophe" in 2016 which was removed from the Tribeca Film Festival by one of its co-founders, Robert De Niro, whose son is on the autism spectrum.

According to a 2020 article in The Telegraph, Wakefield had become prominent in the anti-vaccine movement and, during the COVID-19 pandemic, promoted his discredited claims about vaccine safety. He appeared at summits warning that vaccines "will kill us" and called for widespread protests against their use.

In a 2025 interview with Democracy Now, the investigative journalist Brian Deer identified Robert F. Kennedy Jr., Andrew Wakefield, and Del Bigtree as the core leaders of the anti-vaccine movement. During the interview, Deer offered his perspective on the Senate confirmation hearings for Kennedy Jr., specifically addressing the questioning by senators Bernie Sanders and Bill Cassidy regarding Kennedy's alignment with Wakefield's discredited theory linking vaccines to autism.

=== Claims of measles virus–Crohn's disease link ===
Back in the UK, he worked on the liver transplant programme at the Royal Free Hospital in London. In 1993, Wakefield attracted professional attention when he published reports in which he concluded that measles virus might cause Crohn's disease; and two years later he published a paper in The Lancet proposing a link between the measles vaccine and Crohn's disease. Subsequent research failed to confirm this hypothesis, with a group of experts in Britain reviewing a number of peer-reviewed studies in 1998 and concluding that the measles virus did not cause Crohn's disease, and neither did the MMR vaccine.

Later, in 1995, while conducting research into Crohn's disease, he was approached by Rosemary Kessick, the parent of a child with autism, who was seeking help with her son's bowel problems and autism; Kessick ran a group called Allergy Induced Autism. In 1996, Wakefield turned his attention to researching possible connections between the MMR vaccine and autism.

At the time of his MMR research study, Wakefield was senior lecturer and honorary consultant in experimental gastroenterology at the Royal Free Hospital School of Medicine (from 2008, UCL Medical School). He resigned in 2001, by "mutual agreement and was made a fellow of the Royal College of Pathologists", and moved to the US in 2001 (or 2004, by another account). He was reportedly asked to leave the Royal Free Hospital after refusing a request to validate his 1998 Lancet paper with a controlled study.

Wakefield is barred from practising as a physician in the UK, and is not licensed in the US. He lives in the US where he has a following, including the anti-vaccinationist Jenny McCarthy, who wrote the foreword for Wakefield's autobiography, Callous Disregard. She has a son with autism-like symptoms that she believes were caused by the MMR vaccine. According to Deer, as of 2011, Wakefield lives near Austin with his family.

== The Lancet fraud ==
On 28 February 1998, Wakefield was the lead author of a study of twelve children with autism that was published in The Lancet. The study proposed a new syndrome called autistic enterocolitis, and raised the possibility of a link between a novel form of bowel disease, autism, and the MMR vaccine. The authors said that the parents of eight of the twelve children linked what were described as "behavioural symptoms" with MMR, and reported that the onset of these symptoms began within two weeks of MMR vaccination.

These possible triggers were reported as MMR in eight cases, and measles infection in one. The paper was instantly controversial, leading to widespread publicity in the UK and the convening of a special panel of the UK's Medical Research Council the following month. One 2005 study in Japan found that there was no causal relationship between the MMR vaccine and autism in groups of children given the triple MMR vaccine and children who received individual measles, mumps and rubella vaccinations. In Japan, the MMR vaccine had been replaced with individual vaccinations in 1993.

Although the paper said that no causal connection had been proven, before it was published, Wakefield made statements at a press conference and in a video news release issued by the hospital, calling for suspension of the triple MMR vaccine until more research could be done. This was later criticised as 'science by press conference'. According to BBC News, it was this press conference, rather than the paper in The Lancet, that fuelled the MMR vaccination scare. The BBC report said he told journalists that "it was a 'moral issue' and he could no longer support the continued use of the three-in-one jab for measles, mumps and rubella. 'Urgent further research is needed to determine whether MMR may give rise to this complication in a small number of people,' Wakefield said at the time." He said "If you give three viruses together, three live viruses, then you potentially increase the risk of an adverse event occurring, particularly when one of those viruses influences the immune system in the way that measles does." He suggested parents should opt for single vaccinations against measles, mumps and rubella, separated by gaps of one year. 60 Minutes interviewed him in November 2000, and he repeated these claims to the US audience, providing a new focus for the nascent anti-vaccination movement in the US, which had been primarily concerned about thiomersal in vaccines. In November 2001, Wakefield resigned from the Royal Free Hospital, saying, "I have been asked to go because my research results are unpopular." The medical school said that he had left "by mutual agreement". In February 2002, Wakefield stated: "What precipitated this crisis was the removal of the single vaccine, the removal of choice, and that is what has caused the furore—because the doctors, the gurus, are treating the public as though they are some kind of moronic mass who cannot make an informed decision for themselves."

=== Aftermath of initial controversy ===
Wakefield continued to conduct clinical research in the United States after leaving the Royal Free Hospital in December 2001. He joined a controversial American researcher, Jeff Bradstreet, at the International Child Development Resource Center, to conduct further studies on the possible relationship between the MMR vaccine and autism.

In 2004, Wakefield began working at the Thoughtful House research centre in Austin, Texas. Wakefield served as executive director of Thoughtful House until February 2010, when he resigned in the wake of findings against him by the British General Medical Council.

In February 2004, the controversy resurfaced when Wakefield was accused of a conflict of interest. In The Sunday Times, Brian Deer reported that some of the parents of the 12 children in the study in The Lancet were recruited via a UK lawyer preparing a lawsuit against MMR manufacturers, and that the Royal Free Hospital had received £55,000 from the UK's Legal Aid Board (now the Legal Services Commission) to pay for the research. Previously, in October 2003, the board had cut off public funding for the litigation against MMR manufacturers. Following an investigation of the allegations in The Sunday Times by the UK General Medical Council, Wakefield was charged with serious professional misconduct, including dishonesty. In December 2006, Deer, writing in The Sunday Times, further reported that in addition to the money they donated to the Royal Free Hospital, the lawyers responsible for the MMR lawsuit had paid Wakefield personally more than £400,000, which he had not previously disclosed.

Twenty-four hours before the 2004 Sunday Times report by Deer, The Lancet's editor Richard Horton responded to the investigation in a public statement, describing Wakefield's research as "fatally flawed" and said he believed the paper would have been rejected as biased if the peer reviewers had been aware of Wakefield's conflict of interest. Ten of Wakefield's twelve co-authors of the paper in The Lancet later published a retraction of an interpretation. The section of the paper retracted read as follows:

Interpretation. We identified associated gastrointestinal disease and developmental regression in a group of previously normal children, which was generally associated in time with possible environmental triggers.

The retraction stated:

We wish to make it clear that in this paper no causal link was established between (the) vaccine and autism, as the data were insufficient. However the possibility of such a link was raised, and consequent events have had major implications for public health. In view of this, we consider now is the appropriate time that we should together formally retract the interpretation placed upon these findings in the paper, according to precedent.

=== Wakefield v Channel 4 Television and Others ===
In November 2004, Channel 4 broadcast a one-hour Dispatches investigation by reporter Brian Deer; the Toronto Star said Deer had "produced documentary evidence that Wakefield applied for a patent on a single-jab measles vaccine before his campaign against the MMR vaccine, raising questions about his motives".

In addition to Wakefield's unpublished initial patent submission, Deer released a copy of the published patent application. On page 1, the first paragraph of this stated:

The present invention relates to a new vaccine/immunisation for the prevention and/or prophylaxis against measles virus infection and to a pharmaceutical or therapeutic composition for the treatment of IBD (Inflammatory Bowel Disease); particularly Crohn's Disease and Ulcerative Colitis and regressive behavioural disease (RBD).

Before describing the research in Wakefield's 1998 paper in The Lancet, at the same page this patent explicitly states that the use of the MMR vaccine causes autism:

It has now also been shown that use of the MMR vaccine (which is taken to include live attenuated measles vaccine virus, measles virus, mumps vaccine virus and rubella vaccine virus, and wild strains of the aforementioned viruses) results in ileal lymphoid nodular hyperplasia, chronic colitis and pervasive developmental disorder including autism (RBD), in some infants.

According to Deer, a letter from Wakefield's lawyers to him dated 31 January 2005 said: "Dr Wakefield did not plan a rival vaccine."

In the Dispatches programme, Deer also revealed that Nicholas Chadwick, a researcher working under Wakefield's supervision in the Royal Free medical school, had failed to find measles virus in the children reported on in The Lancet.

In January 2005, Wakefield initiated libel proceedings against Channel 4, the independent production company Twenty Twenty and Brian Deer, The Sunday Times, and against Deer personally along with his website briandeer.com in the case Wakefield v Channel Four Television and Others [2006] EWHC 3289 (QB); [2007] 94 BMLR 1. Within weeks of issuing his claims, however, Wakefield sought to have the action frozen until after the conclusion of General Medical Council proceedings against him. Channel 4 and Deer sought a High Court order compelling Wakefield to continue with his action, or discontinue it. After a hearing on 27 and 28 October 2005, Justice David Eady ruled against a stay of proceedings:

It thus appears that the Claimant wishes to use the existence of the libel proceedings for public relations purposes, and to deter other critics, while at the same time isolating himself from the "downside" of such litigation, in having to answer a substantial defence of justification ... I am quite satisfied, therefore, that the Claimant wished to extract whatever advantage he could from the existence of the proceedings while not wishing to progress them or to give the Defendants an opportunity of meeting the claims.

The judgment identified Channel 4's "very lengthy extracts" summarising Deer's allegations against Wakefield:

(i) [Wakefield] spread fear that the MMR vaccine might lead to autism, even though he knew that his own laboratory had carried out tests whose results dramatically contradicted his claims in that the measles virus had not been found in a single one of the children concerned in his study and he knew or ought to have known that there was absolutely no basis at all for his belief that the MMR should be broken up into single vaccines.

(ii) In spreading such fear, acted dishonestly and for mercenary motives in that, although he improperly failed to disclose the fact, he planned a rival vaccine and products (such as a diagnostic kit based on his theory) that could have made his fortune

(iii) Gravely abused the children under his care by unethically carrying out extensive invasive procedures (on occasions requiring three people to hold a child down), thereby driving nurses to leave and causing his medical colleagues serious concern and unhappiness

(iv) Improperly and/or dishonestly failed to disclose to his colleagues and to the public that his research on autistic children had begun with a contract with solicitors who were trying to sue the manufacturers of the MMR vaccine

(v) Improperly or dishonestly lent his reputation to the International Child Development Resource Centre, which promoted to very vulnerable parents expensive products for whose efficacy (as he knew or should have known) there was no scientific evidence

Eady's ruling states that, "The views or conclusions of the GMC disciplinary body would not, so far as I can tell, be relevant or admissible", that Channel 4's allegations "go to undermine fundamentally the Claimant's professional integrity and honesty", and that, "It cannot seriously be suggested that priority should be given to GMC proceedings for the resolution of issues."

In December 2006, Deer released records obtained from the Legal Services Commission, showing that Richard Barr, a lawyer planning a class-action lawsuit against vaccine manufacturers, had paid £435,643 in undisclosed fees to Wakefield for the purpose of building a case against the MMR vaccine. Those payments, The Sunday Times reported, had begun two years before publication of Wakefield's paper in The Lancet. Within days of Deer's report, Wakefield dropped all his libel actions and was ordered to pay all defendants' legal costs.

=== Other concerns ===
Wakefield's data were also questioned; a former graduate student, who appeared in Deer's programme, later testified that Wakefield ignored laboratory data that conflicted with his hypothesis. An independent investigation of a collaborating laboratory questioned the accuracy of the data underpinning Wakefield's claims.

In June 2005, the BBC programme Horizon reported on an unnamed and unpublished study of blood samples from a group of 100 autistic children and 200 children without autism. They reported finding 99% of the samples contained no trace of the measles virus, and the samples that did contain the virus were just as likely to be from non-autistic children, i.e., only three samples contained the measles virus, one from an autistic child and two from a typically developing child. The study's authors found no evidence of any link between MMR and autism.

The Institute of Medicine (IOM) of the United States National Academy of Sciences, along with the CDC and the UK National Health Service, have found no link between vaccines and autism. Reviews in the medical literature have also found no link between the MMR vaccine and autism or with bowel disease, which Wakefield called "autistic enterocolitis".

== General Medical Council hearings ==
Between July 2007 and May 2010, a 217-day "fitness to practise" hearing of the UK General Medical Council examined charges of professional misconduct against Wakefield and two colleagues involved in the paper in The Lancet. The charges included that he:

- "Was being paid to conduct the study by solicitors representing parents who believed their children had been harmed by MMR".
- Ordered investigations "without the requisite paediatric qualifications" including colonoscopies, colon biopsies and lumbar punctures ("spinal taps") on his research subjects without the approval of his department's ethics board and contrary to the children's clinical interests, when these diagnostic tests were not indicated by the children's symptoms or medical history.
- "Act[ed] 'dishonestly and irresponsibly' in failing to disclose ... how patients were recruited for the study" as well as in his descriptions in the Lancet papers and in questions after the paper published, about what ailments the children had, and when those ailments were observed relative to their getting vaccinated.
- "Conduct[ed] the study on a basis not approved by the hospital's ethics committee."
- Purchased blood samples—for £5 each—from children present at his son's birthday party, which Wakefield joked about in a later presentation.
- "[S]howed callous disregard for any distress or pain the children might suffer"

Wakefield denied the charges; on 28 January 2010, the GMC ruled against Wakefield on all issues, stating that he had "failed in his duties as a responsible consultant", acted against the interests of patients, and "dishonestly and irresponsibly" in his controversial research. On 24 May 2010, he was struck off the United Kingdom medical register. It was the harshest sanction that the GMC could impose, and effectively ended his career as a physician. In announcing the ruling, the GMC said that Wakefield had "brought the medical profession into disrepute", and no sanction short of erasing his name from the register was appropriate for the "serious and wide-ranging findings" of misconduct. On the same day, Wakefield's autobiography, Callous Disregard, was published, using the same words as one of the charges against him ("he showed callous disregard for any distress or pain the children might suffer"). Wakefield argued that he had been unfairly treated by the medical and scientific establishment.

== Fraud and conflict of interest allegations ==
In February 2009, The Sunday Times reported that a further investigation by the newspaper had revealed that Wakefield "changed and misreported results in his research, creating the appearance of a possible link with autism", citing evidence obtained by the newspaper from medical records and interviews with witnesses, and supported by evidence presented to the GMC.

In April 2010, Deer expanded on laboratory aspects of his findings in a report in the BMJ, recounting how normal clinical histopathology results (obtained from the Royal Free hospital) had been subjected to wholesale changes, from normal to abnormal, in the medical school and published in The Lancet. On 2 January 2011, Deer provided two tables comparing the data on the twelve children, showing the original hospital data and the data with the wholesale changes as used in the 1998 The Lancet article.

On 5 January 2011, BMJ published an article by Brian Deer entitled "How the case against the MMR vaccine was fixed". Deer said that, based on examination of the medical records of the 12 children in the original study, his research had found:

The paper in The Lancet was a case series of 12 child patients; it reported a proposed "new syndrome" of enterocolitis and regressive autism and associated this with MMR as an "apparent precipitating event." But in fact:

Three of nine children reported with regressive autism did not have autism diagnosed at all. Only one child clearly had regressive autism;

Despite the paper claiming that all 12 children were "previously normal", five had documented pre-existing developmental concerns;

Some children were reported to have experienced first behavioural symptoms within days of MMR, but the records documented these as starting some months after vaccination;

In nine cases, unremarkable colonic histopathology results—noting no or minimal fluctuations in inflammatory cell populations—were changed after a medical school "research review" to "non-specific colitis";

The parents of eight children were reported as blaming MMR, but 11 families made this allegation at the hospital. The exclusion of three allegations—all giving times to onset of problems in months—helped to create the appearance of a 14-day temporal link;

Patients were recruited through anti-MMR campaigners, and the study was commissioned and funded for planned litigation.

In an accompanying editorial, BMJ editors said:

Clear evidence of falsification of data should now close the door on this damaging vaccine scare ... Who perpetrated this fraud? There is no doubt that it was Wakefield. Is it possible that he was wrong, but not dishonest: that he was so incompetent that he was unable to fairly describe the project, or to report even one of the 12 children's cases accurately? No. A great deal of thought and effort must have gone into drafting the paper to achieve the results he wanted: the discrepancies all led in one direction; misreporting was gross. Moreover, although the scale of the GMC's 217-day hearing precluded additional charges focused directly on the fraud, the panel found him guilty of dishonesty concerning the study's admissions criteria, its funding by the Legal Aid Board, and his statements about it afterwards.

The British Medical Journal editorial concluded that Wakefield's paper was an "elaborate fraud".

In a BMJ follow-up article on 11 January 2011, Deer stated that Wakefield had planned to capitalise on the MMR vaccination scare provoked by his paper. He said that based upon documents he had obtained under Freedom of information legislation, Wakefield—in partnership with the father of one of the boys in the study—had planned to launch a venture on the back of an MMR vaccination scare that would profit from new medical tests and "litigation driven testing". The Washington Post reported that Deer said that Wakefield predicted he "could make more than $43 million a year from diagnostic kits" for the new condition, autistic enterocolitis. According to Deer's report in BMJ, the ventures, Immunospecifics Biotechnologies Ltd and Carmel Healthcare Ltd—named after Wakefield's wife—failed after Wakefield's superiors at University College London's medical school gave him a two-page letter that said:

We remain concerned about a possible serious conflict of interest between your academic employment by UCL, and your involvement with Carmel ... This concern arose originally because the company's business plan appears to depend on premature, scientifically unjustified publication of results, which do not conform to the rigorous academic and scientific standards that are generally expected.

WebMD reported on Deer's BMJ report, saying that the $43 million predicted yearly profits would come from marketing kits for "diagnosing patients with autism" and that "the initial market for the diagnostic will be litigation-driven testing of patients with AE [autistic enterocolitis, an unproven condition concocted by Wakefield] from both the UK and the US". According to WebMD, the BMJ article also claimed that Carmel Healthcare Ltd. would succeed in marketing products and developing a replacement vaccine if "public confidence in the MMR vaccine [were] damaged".

In October 2012, research published in PNAS, the Proceedings of the National Academy of Sciences, identified Wakefield's 1998 paper as the most cited retracted scientific paper, with 758 citations, and gave the "reason for retraction" as "fraud".

=== Journal retractions ===
On 2 February 2010, The Lancet formally retracted Wakefield's 1998 paper. The retraction states: "The claims in the original paper that children were 'consecutively referred' and that investigations were 'approved' by the local ethics committee have been proven to be false."

The following day, the editor of a specialist journal, NeuroToxicology, withdrew another Wakefield paper that was in press. The article, which concerned research on monkeys, had already been published online and sought to implicate vaccines in autism.

In May 2010, The American Journal of Gastroenterology retracted a paper of Wakefield's that used data from the 12 patients of the article in The Lancet.

On 5 January 2011, British Medical Journal editors recommended that Wakefield's other publications be scrutinised and retracted if need be.

=== Wakefield response ===
As of January 2011, Wakefield continued to maintain his innocence. In a press release, he stated,

I want to make one thing crystal clear for the record—my research and the serious medical problems found in those children were not a hoax and there was no fraud whatsoever. Nor did I seek to profit from our findings ... despite media reports to the contrary, the results of my research have been duplicated in five other countries ... I continue to fully support more independent research to determine if environmental triggers, including vaccines, are causing autism and other developmental problems ... Since the Lancet paper, I have lost my job, my career and my country. To claim that my motivation was profit is patently untrue. I will not be deterred—this issue is far too important.

In an Internet radio interview, Wakefield said the BMJ series "was utter nonsense" and denied "that he used the cases of the 12 children in his study to promote his business venture". Deer has filed financial disclosure forms and rejects Wakefield's claim that he is funded by the pharmaceutical industry. According to CNN, Wakefield said the patent he held was for "an 'over-the-counter nutritional supplement' that boosts the immune system". WebMD reported that Wakefield said he was the victim of "a ruthless, pragmatic attempt to crush any attempt to investigate valid vaccine safety concerns".

Wakefield says that Deer is a "hit man who was brought in to take [him] down" and that other scientists have simply taken Deer at his word. While on Anderson Cooper 360°, he said that he had not read the BMJ articles yet, but he denied their validity and denied that Deer had interviewed the families of the children in the study. He also urged viewers to read his book, Callous Disregard, which he said would explain why he was being targeted, to which Anderson Cooper replied: "But sir, if you're lying, then your book is also a lie. If your study is a lie, your book is a lie."

Wakefield later implied that there is a conspiracy by public health officials and pharmaceutical companies to discredit him, including suggesting they pay bloggers to post rumours about him on websites or that they artificially inflated reports of deaths from measles.

=== Deer counter-response ===
Deer responded to Wakefield's charge by challenging Wakefield to sue him:

If it is true that Andrew Wakefield is not guilty as charged, he has the remedy of bringing a libel action against myself, The Sunday Times of London, against the medical journal here, and he would be the richest man in America.

Deer mentioned that all of Wakefield's previous libel actions had been dismissed or withdrawn.

In January 2012, Wakefield filed a defamation lawsuit in Texas state court against Deer, Fiona Godlee, and the BMJ for false accusations of fraud, seeking a jury trial in Travis County. The filing identified Wakefield as a resident of Austin, and cited the "Texas Long-Arm Statute" as justification for initiating the proceeding in Texas. The BMJ responded that it stood by its reports and would "defend the claim vigorously". In August 2012 District Court Judge Amy Meachum dismissed Wakefield's suit for lack of jurisdiction. Her ruling was upheld on appeal in September 2014 and Wakefield was ordered to pay all parties' costs.

On 5 April 2011, Deer was named the UK's specialist journalist of the year in the British Press Awards, organised by the Society of Editors. The judges said that Deer's investigation of Wakefield was a "tremendous righting of a wrong".

== Epidemics, effects, and reception ==
Physicians, medical journals, and editors have made statements tying Wakefield's fraudulent actions to various epidemics and deaths. Michael J. Smith, a professor of pediatrics at the University of Louisville, an "infectious diseases expert who has studied the autism controversy's effect on immunization rates", said, "Clearly, the results of this [Wakefield] study have had repercussions."

Wakefield's study and his claim that the MMR vaccine might cause autism led to a decline in vaccination rates in the United States, the United Kingdom, and Ireland, and a corresponding rise in measles and mumps infections, resulting in serious illness and deaths. His continued claims that the vaccine is harmful have contributed to a climate of distrust of all vaccines and the reemergence of other previously controlled diseases.

The Associated Press said:

Immunization rates in Britain dropped from 92 percent to 73 percent, and were as low as 50 percent in some parts of London. The effect was not nearly as dramatic in the United States, but researchers have estimated that as many as 125,000 US children born in the late 1990s did not get the MMR vaccine because of the Wakefield splash.

WWAY, an ABC affiliate in Wilmington, North Carolina, said:

Since Dr. Andrew Wakefield's study was released in 1998, many parents have been convinced the measles, mumps and rubella vaccine could lead to autism. But that study may have done more harm than good. According to the Centers for Disease Control and Prevention, in the United States, more cases of measles were reported in 2008 than any year since 1997. More than 90 percent of those infected had not been vaccinated, or their vaccination status was not known.

Paul Hébert, editor-in-chief of the Canadian Medical Association Journal (CMAJ) said:

There has been a huge impact from the Wakefield fiasco ... This spawned a whole anti-vaccine movement. Great Britain has seen measles outbreaks. It probably resulted in a lot of deaths.

A profile in a New York Times Magazine article commented:

Andrew Wakefield has become one of the most reviled doctors of his generation, blamed directly and indirectly, depending on the accuser, for irresponsibly starting a panic with tragic repercussions: vaccination rates so low that childhood diseases once all but eradicated here—whooping cough and measles, among them—have re-emerged, endangering young lives.

In January 2011, CNN reported:

Asked whether he thinks Wakefield should face criminal charges, Deer said, "I personally do."

On 1 April 2011, the James Randi Educational Foundation awarded Wakefield the Pigasus Award for "refusal to face reality".

A 2011 journal article described the vaccine-autism connection as "the most damaging medical hoax of the last 100 years".

In 2011, Wakefield was at the top of the list of the worst doctors of 2011 in Medscape's list of "Physicians of the Year: Best and Worst". In January 2012, Time magazine named Wakefield in a list of "Great Science Frauds". In 2012 he was awarded the Lifetime Achievement in Quackery award by the Good Thinking Society.

A writer from The New York Times, who was covering a 2011 event in Tomball, Texas where Wakefield spoke, was threatened by its organiser, Michelle Guppy: "Be nice to him, or we will hurt you." Guppy is the coordinator of the Houston Autism Disability Network.

In June 2012, a local court in Rimini, Italy, ruled that the MMR vaccination had caused autism in a 15-month-old boy. The court relied heavily on Wakefield's discredited Lancet paper and largely ignored the scientific evidence presented to it. The decision was appealed. On 13 February 2015, the decision was overturned by a Court of Appeals in Bologna.

In February 2015, Wakefield denied that he bore any responsibility for the measles epidemic that started at Disneyland. He also reaffirmed his discredited belief that "MMR contributes to the current autism epidemic". By that time at least 166 measles cases had been reported. Paul Offit did not agree, saying that the outbreak was "directly related to Dr. Wakefield's theory".

Filmmaker Miranda Bailey followed Wakefield and his wife Carmel and their children for five years filming a documentary about Wakefield as a person, The Pathological Optimist. According to Robert Ladendorf writing for Skeptical Inquirer magazine, Bailey attempted to remain neutral and add a "human touch", which Ladendorf says was successful. Wakefield is shown "as a soft-spoken but beleaguered family man trying to resurrect his reputation and raising money for his legal fund."

In 2018, The Skeptic awarded Wakefield the Rusty Razor award "for pseudoscience and bad critical thinking." The award is decided annually by readers' votes. Editor Deborah Hyde said, "Our contributors clearly felt that anti-vaccination damage is still a current issue, despite Mr. Wakefield first having come to public attention so long ago. These childhood diseases can do real damage, so we're proud to be an organisation that gets the good news out there. The evidence is overwhelming that vaccination is safe. Protect your children and your community by using it."

In 2022, Wakefield's fraudulent study was included on a list of "11 of the biggest lies in history".

== Political activism ==
Wakefield was scheduled to testify before the Oregon Senate Health Care Committee on 9 March 2015, in opposition to Senate Bill 442, "a bill that would eliminate nonmedical exemptions from Oregon's school immunization law". The Oregon Chiropractic Association had invited him. The chairman of the committee then canceled the meeting "after it became clear that" Wakefield planned to testify. She denied that her decision had anything to do with Wakefield's plans.

On 24 April 2015, Wakefield received two standing ovations from the students at Life Chiropractic College West when he told them to oppose Senate Bill 277 (SB 277), a bill that proposes elimination of non-medical vaccine exemptions. Wakefield had previously been a featured speaker at a 2014 "California Jam" gathering of chiropractors, as well as a 2015 "California Jam" seminar, with continuing education credits, sponsored by Life Chiropractic College West. On 3 July 2015, Wakefield participated in a protest held in Santa Monica, California, against SB 277, a recently enacted bill which removed the personal belief exemption to school vaccine requirements in California state law.

Regarding his anti-vaccine advocacy, Wakefield has been described as a conspiracy theorist by ThinkProgress, The Washington Post, The Guardian, Wired, the Johns Hopkins Bloomberg School of Public Health, Steven Salzberg, and Paul Offit.

== Vaxxed film ==
In 2016, Wakefield directed the anti-vaccination propaganda film Vaxxed: From Cover-Up to Catastrophe. The film purports to show "an appalling cover-up committed by the government agency charged with protecting the health of American citizens [the US Centers for Disease Control and Prevention (CDC)] ... an alarming deception that has contributed to the skyrocketing increase of autism and potentially the most catastrophic epidemic of our lifetime." The film was withdrawn from New York's 2016 Tribeca Film Festival after the festival's founder Robert De Niro (who has a child with autism) reversed his decision to include it. The film was also scheduled to be screened at the Mairie de Paris but was then moved to a small private cinema. Wakefield called this action censorship.

Ian Lipkin, professor of epidemiology and director of the Center for Infection and Immunity at the Columbia University Mailman School of Public Health, writing in The Wall Street Journal, said: "If Vaxxed had been submitted as science fiction, it would merit attention for its story line, character development and dialogue. But as a documentary it misrepresents what science knows about autism, undermines public confidence in the safety and efficacy of vaccines, and attacks the integrity of legitimate scientists and public-health officials".

== Selected works ==
=== Books ===
- Deer, Brian (2020). The Doctor Who Fooled the World: Science, Deception, and the War on Vaccines. Scribe. ISBN 978-1-911617-80-8.
- Wakefield, Andrew J (2010). Callous Disregard: Autism and Vaccines: The Truth Behind a Tragedy. Skyhorse Publishing. ISBN 978-1-61608-169-0.

=== Journal articles ===
- Withdrawn: Hewitson L, Houser LA, Stott C, Sackett G, Tomko JL, Atwood D, Blue L, White ER, Wakefield AJ (October 2009). "WITHDRAWN: Delayed acquisition of neonatal reflexes in newborn primates receiving a thimerosal-containing Hepatitis B vaccine: Influence of gestational age and birth weight". Neurotoxicology. doi:10.1016/j.neuro.2009.09.008. PMID 19800915.
- Retracted: Wakefield AJ, Anthony A, Murch SH, Thomson M, Montgomery SM, Davies S, O'Leary JJ, Berelowitz M, Walker-Smith JA (September 2000). "Enterocolitis in children with developmental disorders". Am. J. Gastroenterol. 95 (9): 2285–2295. doi:10.1111/j.1572-0241.2000.03248.x. PMID 11007230. S2CID 22460603. (Retracted, see doi:10.1038/ajg.2010.149, PMID 20445528)
- Retracted: Wakefield AJ, Murch SH, Anthony A, Linnell J, Casson DM, Malik M, Berelowitz M, Dhillon AP, Thomson MA, Harvey P, Valentine A, Davies SE, Walker-Smith JA (1998). "Ileal-lymphoid-nodular hyperplasia, non-specific colitis, and pervasive developmental disorder in children". The Lancet. 351 (9103): 637–641. Bibcode:1998Lanc..351..637W. doi:10.1016/S0140-6736(97)11096-0. PMID 9500320. S2CID 439791. (Retracted, see doi:10.1016/S0140-6736(10)60175-4, PMID 20137807, Retraction Watch)
- Wakefield AJ, Ekbom A, Dhillon AP, Pittilo RM, Pounder RE (March 1995). "Crohn's disease: pathogenesis and persistent measles virus infection". Gastroenterology. 108 (3): 911–916. doi:10.1016/0016-5085(95)90467-0. PMID 7875495.
- Wakefield AJ, Pittilo RM, Sim R, Cosby SL, Stephenson JR, Dhillon AP, Pounder RE (April 1993). "Evidence of persistent measles virus infection in Crohn's disease". J. Med. Virol. 39 (4): 345–353. doi:10.1002/jmv.1890390415. PMID 8492105. S2CID 29899812.
- Wakefield, AJ; Sankey EA; Dhillon AP; et al. (May 1991). "Granulomatous vasculitis in Crohn's disease". Gastroenterology. 100 (5 Pt 1): 1279–1287. doi:10.1016/0016-5085(91)90779-K. PMID 2013373.
- Wakefield AJ, Sawyerr AM, Dhillon AP, Pittilo RM, Rowles PM, Lewis AA, Pounder RE (November 1989). "Pathogenesis of Crohn's disease: multifocal gastrointestinal infarction". The Lancet. 2 (8671): 1057–1062. doi:10.1016/s0140-6736(89)91078-7. PMID 2572794. S2CID 23490194.

=== Films ===
Wakefield has directed the following films:

- Who Killed Alex Spourdalakis?, 2015
- Vaxxed, 2016
- 1986: The Act, 2020
- Protocol 7, 2024

== See also ==
- H. Hugh Fudenberg
- List of scientific misconduct incidents
