= Science Moms =

2017 documentary film

- Directed by: Natalie Newell
- Produced by: Natalie Newell
- Starring: Alison Bernstein; Anastasia Bodnar; Layla Katiraee; Kavin Senapathy; Jenny Splitter
- Release date: October 2017
- Running time: 30 minutes
- Country: United States
- Language: English

Science Moms is a 2017 American documentary film about mothers who advocate for science-based decision-making concerning the health and nutrition of children. The film covers vaccines, autism, celebrity-endorsed health fads, cancer, allergies, organic food, GMOs, homeopathy, and the appeal to nature fallacy.

Originally only available by direct download for a fee from the Science Moms website, in May 2018, the full film was posted to the Science Moms YouTube channel for free viewing.

== Background ==
In 2015, a group of bloggers (Note: The signature field of the letter to the celebrity moms was as follows (with bold added to indicate those who went on to be featured in Science Moms): "Sincerely, * Kavin Senapathy: Freelance writer, science popularizer, co-founder of March Against Myths, mother of two (ages 4 and 2), * Dr. Layla Katiraee: Scientist, writer at FrankenFoodFacts and Biology Fortified, and mother of a 3-year-old, * Dr. Anastasia Bodnar: Scientist, co-founder of the non-profit Biology Fortified, Inc., and mother of a 15-month-old, * Dr. Alison Bernstein: Scientist, writer, mother of two (ages 7 and 2), AKA “Mommy PhD”, * Julie Borlaug: Associate Director for external relations at the Norman Borlaug Institute for International Agriculture, and Strategic Initiatives, Texas A&M AgriLife Research, and mother of a 6-year-old, * Dr. Alison Van Eenennaam: University researcher and animal biotechnology specialist, and mother of two (ages 15 and 17), * Sarah Schultz: Nurse, wife of a farmer, writer at Nurse Loves Farmer, mother of two (ages 5 and 2), * Sara, science communicator and blogger at It’s Momsense, mother of two (ages 5 and 7), * Jenny Splitter: Writer at Grounded Parents, storyteller, mother of two (ages 11 and 4), Science Activist and food allergy parent, * Joni Kamiya: Biotech papaya farmer’s daughter, blogger at Hawaii Farmer’s Daughter. Mother of three (ages 7 months, 5, and 10), * Jennie Schmidt, MS, RD – Farmer & Registered Dietitian, AKA “The Foodie Farmer”, mother of two (ages 15 and 17), * Dr. Denneal Jamison-McClung: University biotechnology educator, program administrator and mother of an 11-year-old, * Krista Stauffer: Dairy farmer, writer, blogger at The Farmer’s Wifee, [sic] Founder of Ask the Farmers and mother of three (ages 8, 5, and 3).") wrote an open letter to several celebrity mothers, including Sarah Michelle Gellar and Gwyneth Paltrow, criticizing their anti-GMO stance, and explaining the safety and benefits of GMOs. The letter, in part, read:

Please, don't co-opt motherhood and wield your fame to oppose beneficial technologies like genetic engineering. Certain celebrities have misled thousands of parents into thinking that vaccines are harmful, and we see the same pattern of misinformation repeating itself here. When GMOs are stigmatized, farmers and consumers aren't able to benefit from much-needed advancements like plants with increased nutrients, or plants that can adapt to changing environmental stresses.

This letter caught the attention of Natalie Newell, who said "I was so impressed to see this group of intelligent, relatable and reasonable moms standing up for science and against the fear-based culture that seems to have infected the world of parenting." Newell reached out to Jenny Splitter, one of the letter's authors, about working together on a documentary. Following discussion with Splitter and others, Newell went on to produce the film, along with executive producer Stephen Hupp, a professor of psychology at Southern Illinois University Edwardsville. Newell also served as the director on the documentary.

== Description ==
Featured in the film are writer Jenny Splitter, neuroscientist Alison Bernstein, plant geneticist Anastasia Bodnar, molecular geneticist Layla Katiraee, and science communicator Kavin Senapathy. As reported by the Center for Inquiry: "Through interviews with five... moms with careers in science, we get both an idea of what the modern parent has to contend with, as well as some clarity on some of the more hot-button issues around food and health."

According to one of the science moms featured in the film, Kavin Senapathy, the film's goal is to provide a counterpoint to wide-spread anti-science misinformation affecting parenting, including anti-GMO and anti-vaccine propaganda. In an interview with Susan Gerbic for the Center for Inquiry, Senapathy said that for many moms parenthood becomes a large part of their identity. When that happens, "it is easy for purveyors of misinformation to exploit [them]."

According to Katiraee, another science mom in the film, “Celebrities are beautiful, with aspirational lifestyles... but we shouldn’t take their parenting advice without scrutiny. Giving birth doesn’t mean our ‘mommy instinct’ is correct. That requires evidence.”

Producer/director Newell has said, "The goal of the movie is to provide a counter-narrative to the anti-GMO, anti-vax, pro-alternative medicine culture that has popped up in the world of parenting." She also said that critical thinking is very important, and she hopes Science Moms could act as a springboard to that end.

In 2017, journalist Carey Gillam accused the Science Moms team of having ties to Monsanto. In a December 10, 2017 interview on the Serious Inquires Only podcast, Natalie Newell speculated as to where Gillam got the notion that the creation of Science Moms was influenced by Monsanto. Newell thinks that it may be due to an email written by biologist Kevin Folta which was obtained through a Freedom of Information Act (FOIA) request, in which Folta wrote "Moms are people to talk to about this stuff."

In January 2018, Parent.com reported on the documentary in an article titled "5 Food Myths It's Time to Stop Believing" and detailed the five food myths that the film takes on as follows:

- MYTH: Celebrities are authorities
- MYTH: "Chemical" is a bad word
- MYTH: Organic means pesticide-free
- MYTH: GMO's should terrify you
- MYTH: Fear of food is healthy

== Release ==
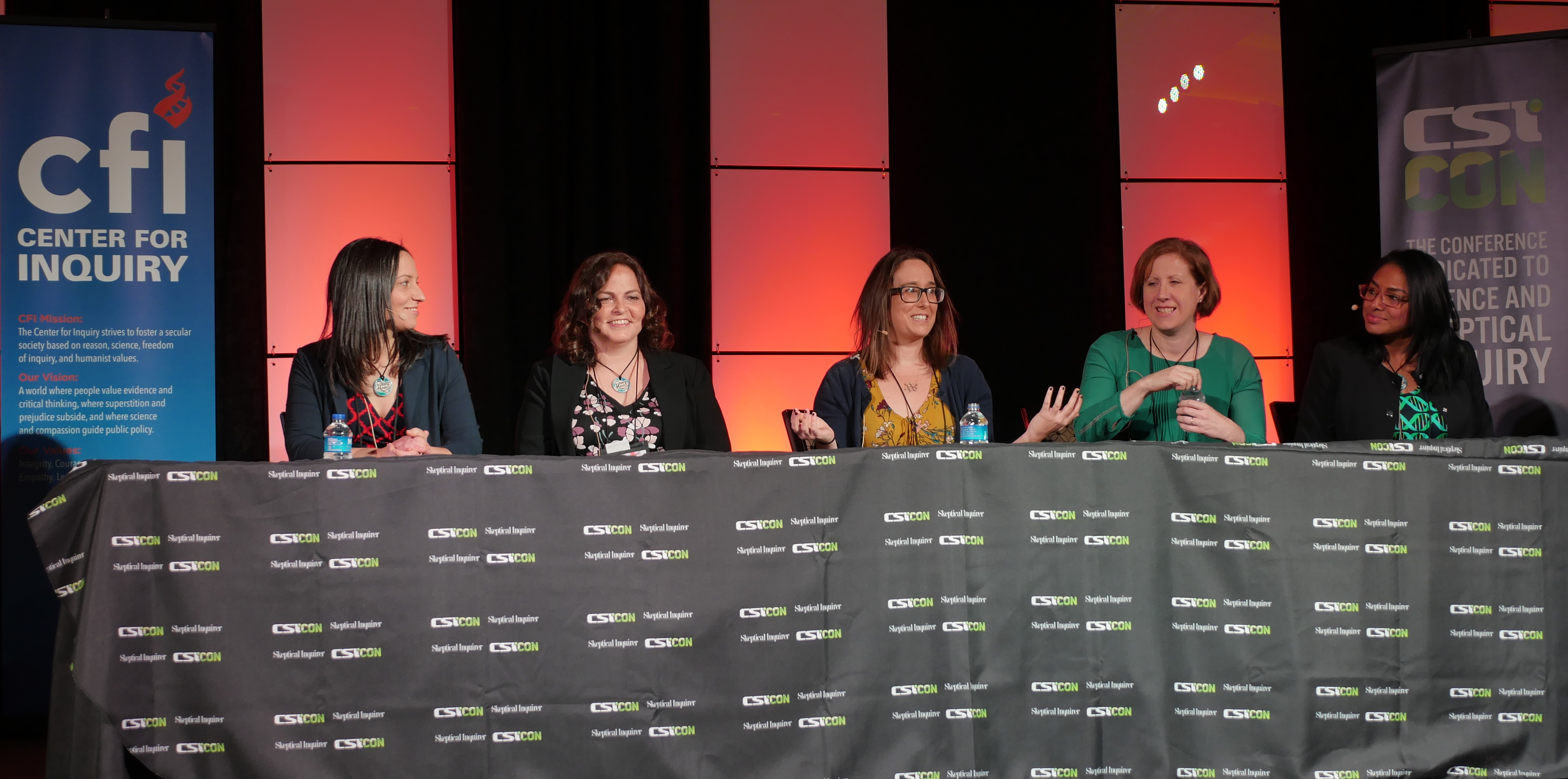
Panel discussion following the screening of Science Moms at CSICon 2017

Science Moms debuted at QED in Manchester on October 14, 2017. The American premiere of the film was held at the scientific skepticism conference, CSICon 2017, run by the Center For Inquiry, on October 28, 2017 in Las Vegas.

Upon its initial release, the film was made available for a fee by direct download from the Science Moms website, but on May 11, 2018, the full film was posted to the Science Moms YouTube channel for free viewing.

== Reception ==
Harriet Hall reviewed the documentary and described it as taking a novel approach, saying that it "features scientist moms who are just like other moms except that they understand the science... They provide the facts to counteract unreasonable fears." She concluded that "The 30-minute film is scientifically accurate, persuasive, and well-designed, with good production values," and "A lot of people really need to watch this documentary."

The film was reviewed by Jennifer Muirhead of Weekend Notes, who said that it "invites discussion about how to find quality information amid the sea of opinions and conjecture at our fingertips and encourages fellow parents to seek out the facts and not to let fear control their lives. It's a great resource for all parents and anyone wanting to learn more about GMOs and organic food."

As reported in the New Brunswick Herald, "A group of scientifically literate 'moms' is fighting the flood of misinformation on the Internet with a documentary film. 'Science Moms,' a 29-minute crowdfunded documentary, enjoyed a well-received world premiere at the QED conference in Manchester, UK in mid October, followed by the U.S. premiere at CSIcon in Las Vegas, NV on October 28, 2017."

In May 2018, Hemant Mehta reported on the release of the film to YouTube, and said "It's such a relief to know these mothers are out there, raising their kids with reason instead of giving in to the irrational nonsense people constantly throw in their direction."

== SciMoms ==
Following the production and release of the film, the women involved with it created a non-profit educational organization named SciMoms, in order to continue promoting evidence-based parenting and policy as presented in Science Moms. Additional free material is available from their website.

== See also ==
- Genetically modified food controversies
- Causes of autism
- Vaccination
- Vaccine hesitancy
