= John Walker-Smith =

Australian Paediatric Gastroenterologist (born 1936)

John Walker-Smith Prof.
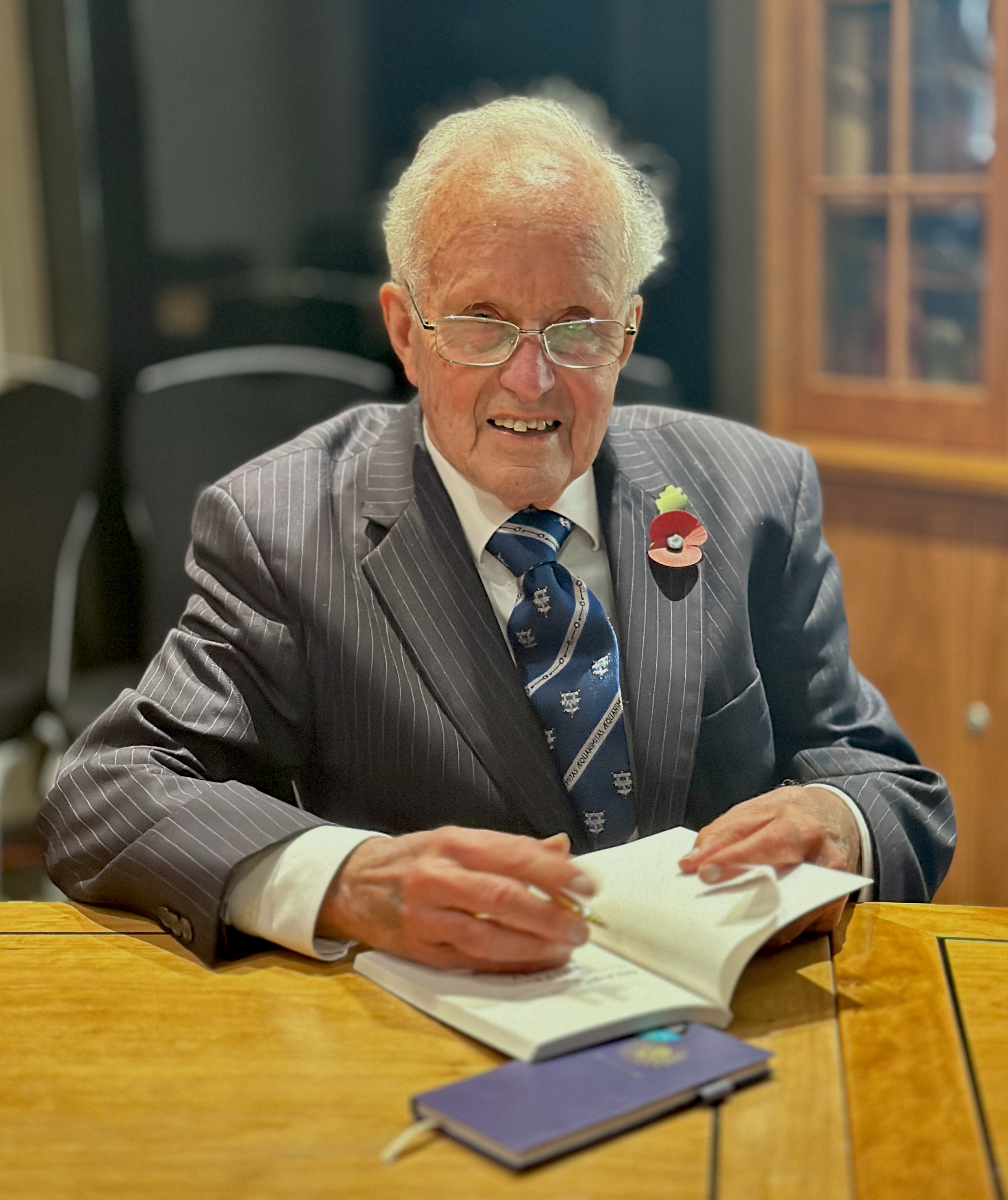
- John Walker-Smith, Osler Club of London, Thomas Cotton room, Royal College of Physicians, London, (2023)
- Born: 1 December 1936 (age 89); Sydney, Australia
- Occupation: Paediatric Gastroenterologist
- Years active: 1966-2000
- Title: Professor
- Board member of: Academic Paediatric Gastroenterologist
- Spouse: Elizabeth Walker-Smith deceased
- Children: Three children, one deceased
- Parent: Dr Angus Walker-Smith Urologist

Academic background
- Education: University of Sydney
- Thesis: MD Dissecting microscope appearances of small bowel in childhood (1971)
- Doctoral advisor: Prof Charlotte Anderson
- Other advisor: Prof Thomas Stapleton
- Influences: Sir Christopher Booth

Academic work
- Era: sixties
- Discipline: Paediatric Gastroenterology
- Sub-discipline: Inflammatory bowel disease Parenteral nutrition
- School or tradition: Sydney Church of England Grammar School
- Institutions: Royal Alexandra Hospital for Children; Brompton Hospital; Royal Prince Alfred Hospital; St Bartholomew's Hospital; Queen Elizabeth Hospital for Children; Royal Free Hospital
- Main interests: Small intestine Inflammatory bowel disease
- Influenced: Stenhammer 2017 Enduring Memories two editions

John Angus Walker-Smith (born 1 December 1936) is an Australian-born British emeritus professor of paediatric gastroenterology, formerly at the Royal Free Hospital. Educated in medicine at the University of Sydney, he was employed at St Bartholomew's Hospital and the Queen Elizabeth Hospital for Children before working for the Royal Free Hospital.

Walker-Smith has research interests in the structure of the small intestine, protein losing enteropathy, bile duct inflammation, and inflammatory bowel disease. He previously served as Editor of the Journal of Pediatric Gastroenterology and Nutrition.

== Early life and education ==
John Walker-Smith was born in 1936 in Sydney, Australia, the elder of two children of a urologist. In 1954 he gained a place to study medicine at the University of Sydney, graduating in 1960.

== Early career ==
In 1961, Walker-Smith released his first publication, and the following year he spent six months at the Royal Alexandra Hospital for Children, Sydney. After being accepted into a course at the Royal Postgraduate Medical School in Hammersmith, London, beginning in the autumn of 1962, he travelled to England as a ship's doctor. At Hammersmith he became interested in the small bowel under the influence of Sir Christopher Booth. In 1963 he joined the Brompton Hospital as house officer, and later became a fellow of the Royal College of Physicians of both London and Edinburgh.

After completing two years in England, Walker-Smith returned to Sydney to join the Royal Prince Alfred Hospital as a research fellow. He then became a member of the Royal Australasian College of Physicians. He learnt gastroenterological procedures that included parenteral nutrition, liver biopsy, and gastrointestinal endoscopy. His research topics included inflammatory bowel disease, protein losing enteropathy, and bile duct inflammation, with a particular focus on the structure of the small intestine, which became the subject of his doctoral thesis in 1970. In 1966, he moved back to England to take up a post at the Royal Alexandra Hospital for Children.

From 1973 Walker-Smith held academic positions at Queen Elizabeth Hospital for Children and St Bartholomew's Hospital, London, where in 1985 he became chair of paediatric gastroenterology. At the Queen Elizabeth in the deprived area of Hackney, he ran a gastroenteritis clinic, which successfully treated dehydrated children with oral solutions. He also chaired the European Society for Paediatric Gastroenterology, Hepatology and Nutrition's working group on acute diarrhoea, which developed and promoted the use of a low osmolality oral rehydration solution for treating acute gastroenteritis. (Note: Oral rehydration therapy (ORT), a mix of water, sugar, and salts, is a simple but life-saving treatment for diarrhoea. It works because sugar helps the body absorb salt and water, even when the intestines are damaged by infections like cholera or rotavirus. Although it is used worldwide, experts still debate the ideal balance of ingredients. The World Health Organisation recommends one formula, which is widely used in developing countries, while wealthier countries often use versions with lower salt and slightly higher sugar levels.) Around this time, in 1975, he wrote the paediatric gastroenterology textbook Diseases of the Small Intestine in Childhood, noted for being one of the first European textbooks covering its subject matter in English.

== Later career ==
In 1995, Walker-Smith's department moved to the Royal Free Hospital, where, as professor, he led the inflammatory bowel disease clinic and a growth inflammatory bowel disease clinic. There, he worked on dietary treatment of children with food intolerance and Crohn's disease, and showed that exclusive enteral nutrition in children with Crohn's disease was safe. He retired in 2000.

== Other roles ==
He later served as the Editor of the Journal of Pediatric Gastroenterology and Nutrition. In 1986 he was appointed president of the British Society of Paediatric Gastroenterology. Bewtween 2008 and 2009, he was president of the Osler Club of London.

After retirement, he acquired a Master of Arts in Christianity and the Arts at King's College London in 2010

== Memoirs ==
According to his memoirs, Walker-Smith's early life was marked by several incidents that he believes led to his career in medicine. At age 14, he fell through a plate glass window, which resulted in a partial palsy of the ulnar nerve, which is noted as possibly contributing to his interest in endoscopy. Before entering the University of Sydney as a medical student, he reported maths as being his worst subject in school, and during his time there had trouble with the practice of auscultation, which led him towards the path of gastroenterology. His first employment out of medical school was at the Children's Hospital at Westmead (then the Royal Alexandra Hospital for Children) in Sydney, followed by a position under Christopher Booth at Hammersmith Hospital.

== MMR vaccine controversy ==
Walker-Smith is the senior co-author of a now-retracted paper (along with Andrew Wakefield, the lead author) which claimed a unique gastrointestinal condition in autistic children that may be connected to the MMR vaccine. This study is generally regarded as sparking the MMR vaccine controversy. In 2010, Walker-Smith was found guilty by the General Medical Council of professional misconduct who recommended erasure subject to appeal. The misconduct finding was reversed on appeal.

In a statement reported in the book on the fraud by Brian Deer, Walker-Smith said:

My case was related to entirely different issues to those that concerned Dr Wakefield... Every investigative procedure I ordered was to find out what was wrong with the children.

In his memoir Enduring Memories, published 2003, Walker-Smith defended Wakefield's integrity, and noted that the pediatric gastroenterologists in his department had never claimed that the MMR vaccine caused autism, nor that it was unsafe.

== Selected publications ==
=== Books ===
- Diseases of the Small Intestine in Childhood. Butterworth-Heinemann. 2013. ISBN 978-1-4831-6112-9.
- Diarrhoea and Malnutrition in Childhood. Butterworth-Heinemann. 2013. ISBN 978-1-4831-4074-2. (Co-author)

=== Further publications after retirement ===
Hope, Beauty and Friendship, Austin Macauley 2023 (A collection of 66 poems)

The Holy Land with Echoes of British Mandate, The Memoir Club 2025

=== Articles ===
- "Polymeric nutrition as the primary therapy in children with small bowel Crohn's disease". Alimentary Pharmacology & Therapeutics. 8 (6): 609–615. December 1994. doi:10.1111/j.1365-2036.1994.tb00338.x. ISSN 0269-2813. PMID 7696450. (Co-author)
- "Guidelines prepared by the ESPGAN Working Group on Acute Diarrhoea. Recommendations for feeding in childhood gastroenteritis. European Society of Pediatric Gastroenterology and Nutrition". Journal of Pediatric Gastroenterology and Nutrition. 24 (5): 619–620. May 1997. doi:10.1097/00005176-199705000-00024. ISSN 0277-2116. PMID 9161963. (Co-author)
- "Mucosal healing in Crohn's disease". Gastroenterology. 114 (2): 419–420. February 1998. doi:10.1016/s0016-5085(98)70509-8. ISSN 0016-5085. PMID 9453509.
- "RETRACTED: Ileal-lymphoid-nodular hyperplasia, non-specific colitis, and pervasive developmental disorder in children". The Lancet. 351 (9103): 637–641. 28 February 1998. doi:10.1016/S0140-6736(97)11096-0. ISSN 0140-6736. (Retracted, see doi:10.1016/S0140-6736(10)60175-4, PMID 20137807, Retraction Watch) (Co-author)
- "Enterocolitis in children with developmental disorders". The American Journal of Gastroenterology. 95 (9): 2285–2295. 1 September 2000. doi:10.1016/S0002-9270(00)02041-4. ISSN 0002-9270. (Co-author)
- "Post-infective diarrhoea". Current Opinion in Infectious Diseases. 14 (5): 567–571. October 2001. doi:10.1097/00001432-200110000-00010. ISSN 0951-7375. PMID 11964877.
- "Gastroenteritis". Diseases of the Small Intestine in Childhood. Elsevier: 185–284. 1988. doi:10.1016/B978-0-407-01320-9.50012-1. PMC 7152053.

== Bibliography ==
- Deer, Brian (2020). The Doctor Who Fooled the World: Science, Deception, and the War on Vaccines. Baltimore: Johns Hopkins University Press. ISBN 978-1-4214-3800-9.
