= JABS =

British anti-vaccine pressure group

Justice, Awareness and Basic Support (JABS)
- Formation: January 1994
- Founder: Jackie Fletcher
- Purpose: Anti-vaccine advocacy
- Website: http://www.jabs.org.uk/

JABS (short for Justice, Awareness and Basic Support) is a British pressure group launched in Wigan in January 1994. Beginning as a support group for the parents of children they claim became ill after the MMR vaccine (which they claim gave their children epilepsy, brain damage or autism – see: MMR vaccine and autism), the group is currently against all forms of vaccination.

== Beginnings ==
The group began as a support group after Jackie Fletcher placed an advert in the newspaper to find parents whose children became ill after their first MMR vaccine after her child was diagnosed with epilepsy ten days after he received an MMR vaccination. According to a pro-JABS article published by Private Eye, "30 families from a small community responded" originally, and by 2002 over two thousand families had been in contact.

== Membership and organisation ==
JABS members are parents of children who allegedly became ill after vaccination, particularly MMR, which they initially claimed to be a cause of brain damage and other medical issues, prior to claims that the MMR vaccine was a cause of autism and of inflammatory bowel disease. In 1996, 400 families has joined the group to seek compensation from the Department of Health over alleged "vaccine damage". It was described in 2001 as the "main organisation" for parents who are "convinced of the link between the MMR vaccine and their child's subsequent development of autism". The group has also claimed that many cases of shaken baby syndrome were caused by vaccines.

It has been described as an anti-vaccine or a "vaccine critical" group. Alongside the earlier U.S.-based National Vaccine Information Center, it has been described as "instrumental" in "misinforming the public, misdirecting health resources, engendering spurious controversy, and facilitating declining vaccination rates to levels below those needed for 'herd immunity' in some regions by way of their emotional pleas". JABS founder Jackie Fletcher says the group is not anti-vaccine, but seeks greater information and compensation for alleged vaccine side-effects.

The group currently has a Facebook page and operates an online message board, JABSforum.

== Richard Barr and Andrew Wakefield ==
A solicitor for the group, Richard Barr, began acting for JABS shortly after its formation. He applied for legal aid to fund clinical studies into associations between the vaccine and the alleged side-effects claimed by JABS. He formed a partnership with Andrew Wakefield in 1996, who was paid £150 per hour by the law firm. The pair were awarded £55,000 by the Legal Aid Board to start their research. JABS referred children to Wakefield, and Wakefield admitted several children of JABS parents to the Royal Free Hospital for tests in 1996.

Barr also paid a substantial sum to then-doctor Wakefield two years before his now-retracted 1998 Lancet report, urging Wakefield to discredit the MMR vaccine. Brian Deer has described this partnership as "the foundation of the vaccine crisis, both in Britain and throughout the world".
