= Margot Shiner =

German-British gastroenterologist

Margot Shiner (nee Last; 4 June 1923 – 31 July 1998) was a German-British gastroenterologist and medical researcher who worked in London and Israel. As a result of her development of a new technique to biopsy the small intestine in children, she has been credited with launching the subspecialty of paediatric gastroenterology.

== Early life ==
Margot Last was born on 4 June 1923 to a Jewish family in Berlin, where her father worked as a textile merchant. In 1936, her family fled Nazi Germany to Prague; they settled in London in 1938. She attended Parliament Hill School and received a medical degree from the University of Leeds in 1947. She married Alex Shiner shortly thereafter, and they had three sons.

== Career ==
After qualifying as a doctor, Shiner returned to London to work as a house officer. After completing her Diploma in Child Health in 1949, she became a house officer at Great Ormond Street Hospital and was an assistant medical officer in Hendon from 1951 to 1952. Seeking a career in research, rather than purely clinical care, she secured an appointment at the Royal Postgraduate Medical School at Hammersmith Hospital, where she began researching paediatric gastroenterology. In 1957, Shiner joined the Medical Research Council (MRC) gastroenterology research unit at Central Middlesex Hospital under the leadership of Francis Avery Jones, and became a consultant gastroenterologist there in 1971. When the research unit was closed, she moved to an MRC research unit at Northwick Park Hospital. She left London for Israel in 1983, establishing a department of paediatric gastroenterology at Assaf Harofeh Medical Center, a teaching hospital of Tel Aviv University's Sackler Faculty of Medicine. She was appointed visiting professor of paediatrics at Tel Aviv University and became an emeritus professor of medicine in 1991.

In 1956, Shiner designed a biopsy tube that could be used to take biopsies from children's small intestines and could thereby be used in the diagnosis of childhood coeliac disease, Whipple's disease and nodular lymphoid hyperplasia. She published the details of her technique in The Lancet. In 1963, she invented a sterile tube that could be used to take uncontaminated bacterial samples from the intestinal cavity; this allowed microbiologists to study the small intestine in greater detail than previously possible. Over her career, she authored 80 original articles, 14 book chapters, and the 1983 textbook Ultrastructure of the Small Intestinal Mucosa.

== Death and legacy ==
Shiner died on 31 July 1998 in Jerusalem from non-Hodgkin's lymphoma.

John Walker-Smith credited Shiner's pioneering use of biopsy tubes to diagnose coeliac disease in children with launching paediatric gastroenterology as a distinct subspecialty. He said of Shiner's technique, "It offered a whole new era of understanding of disorders of the small intestine in childhood." Her biopsy tube came to be known as the Shiner mucosal biopsy tube.
