= Rose Wanjirù Kamenwa =

Kenyan paediatrician, academic, gastroenterologist

Rose Wanjiru Kamenwa
- Born: 1955, May 13; Kamacharia Location, Murang'a
- Died: 2026, Feb 8 Agakhan University Hospital
- Citizenship: Kenyan
- Education: University of Nairobi (MBChB), (M.Med) University of California Children's Medical Centre Japan’s National Children’s Hospital Wellstart International
- Occupation: Paediatric Gastroenterologist Certified lactation management consultant
- Known for: Paediatric gastroenterology Paediatric nutrition
- Spouse: Dr. Leonard Kamenwa Njenga
- Parents: Joram Mugo (father); Julia Wanjiku Mugo (mother)

Rose Wanjirū Kamenwa (13 May 1955 – 8 February 2026) was a Kenyan paediatrician, academic, and pioneering paediatric gastroenterologist. She was recognized as the first trained paediatric gastroenterologist in Kenya and Eastern Africa, and a leading authority in paediatric nutrition, and gastrointestinal diseases in children. Kamenwa was a certified lactation management consultant with over 30 years of experience in teaching and providing breastfeeding support. She was known for her clinical work, teaching, and contributions to child health in Kenya, particularly through her role at Aga Khan University Hospital in Nairobi. She served as a consultant paediatric gastroenterologist at major institutions including Aga Khan University Hospital, Kenyatta National Hospital, and Gertrude’s Children’s Hospital, and was an academic faculty member at Aga Khan University.

== Early life and education ==
Kamenwa was born on 13 May 1955 in Kamacharia Location, Murang’a County, Kenya, to Joram Mugo and Julia Wanjiku Mugo. Her husband is Dr. Leonard Kamenwa Njenga. She has four children.

She studied medicine at the University of Nairobi, graduating with a Bachelor of Medicine and Bachelor of Surgery (MBChB) in 1983. She later completed a Master of Medicine in Paediatrics and Child Health (M.Med) in 1991 at the same institution.

Kamenwa pursued specialized international training in paediatric gastroenterology, including fellowships at the University of California, the Children's Medical Centre in 2001, Japan’s National Children’s Hospital (Tokyo) in 1995, and Wellstart International, San Diego which enhanced her expertise in gastrointestinal disorders in children.

== Career ==
Kamenwa is recognized as the first trained paediatric gastroenterologist in Kenya and Eastern Africa. She is a founding director of Nairobi Pediatric Gastroenterology Centre. She pioneered Pediatric Gastroenterology services in Kenya and East Africa, establishing specialist clinical care and training programs that expanded capacity in child gastrointestinal health. She established paediatric gastroenterology services across multiple Kenyan institutions and helped shape clinical practice and research in food allergy, nutritional disorders, and gastrointestinal diseases in children.

Her work contributed to the development of subspecialty paediatrics in a region with limited expertise in child digestive health, which influenced policy, training, and clinical standards for children’s hospitals and medical schools in Kenya. She also mentored medical students and junior doctors, contributing to the development of specialist paediatric care in Kenya. Kamenwa began her career as a medical officer at Kenyatta National Hospital in the mid-1980s before specialising in paediatrics and later paediatric gastroenterology.

== Administrative roles ==
Kamenwa served in multiple roles. She was a full time faculty and paediatric gastroenterologist at the Department of Paediatrics and Child Health in Agha Khan University in Nairobi from February 2011. She was a art time faculty and paediatric gastroenterologist at Gertrude Children's Hospital and Agha Khan University Hospital, Nairobi from 2002-2007. She was a paediatrician at Kenyatta National Hospital Nairobi, 1991 to 2007. She was Lead consultant and Assistant Professor at Aga Khan University Hospital, Nairobi, for over a decade.Kamenwa was an Honorary Lecturer in paediatrics at the University of Nairobi, 1991 to January 2011. She was a Medical Officer (General practitioner) at Kenyatta National Hospital, Nairobi, 1984 to 1987. Kamenwa was a certified lactation management consultant with over 30 years of experience in teaching and providing breastfeeding support. She was committed to supporting mothers facing breastfeeding challenges.

== Research and publications ==
Kamenwa participated in various research studies in child health and gastroenterology, including: Hospital-acquired malnutrition in children at a tertiary care hospital, clinical outcomes of children with rotavirus infection at Kenyatta National Hospital, a study examining morbidity and clinical outcomes of paediatric rotavirus gastroenteritis in Kenya,and prevalence and genetic diversity of rotavirus infection in children in Nairobi. She has co-authored an article, Prevalence of vitamin D deficiency in exclusively breastfed infants at a tertiary healthcare facility in Nairobi, Kenya.

== Professional affiliations and memberships ==
Kamenwa was a member of several professional medical bodies including: the Kenya Paediatric Association (KPA), Kenya Medical Association (KMA), Allergy Society of Kenya, World Allergy Organisation Panels, North American Society for Paediatric Gastroenterology, Hepatology and Nutrition (NASPGHAN), Nairobi Pediatric Gastroenterology Centre (NPGC), Kenya Medical Women's Association (KMWA), and Gastroenterology Society of Kenya (GSK). She also participated in international research networks like the Worldwide Universities Network (WUN).

== Death ==
Kamenwa died on February 8, 2026 at the Aga Khan University Hospital, Nairobi. Her death was mourned widely within Kenya’s medical community where she was recognized as a pioneer in Paediatric Gastroenterology and child health.
