= Roy Pounder =

British medical doctor and entrepreneur (born 1944)

Roy Pounder (born 1944) is a British physician and entrepreneur. He was Professor of Medicine at the Royal Free and University College Medical School in London and clinical vice president of the Royal College of Physicians of London. As of 2026 he is a London University Emeritus Professor of Medicine.

Controversially, Pounder hired and mentored disgraced researcher Andrew Wakefield, who in 2010 was struck off the medical register by the General Medical Council, and introduced him to reporters at a notorious press conference at the Royal Free on 26 February 1998. At the event, Pounder helped to launch what became an intractable, international health crisis over the measles, mumps, and rubella (MMR) vaccine by stating with regard to the three-in-one inoculation: "In hindsight, it may be a better solution to give the vaccinations separately." Pounder was later reported in the British Medical Journal as having been allocated stock in a business venture with Wakefield to sell products exploiting the public alarm.

Pounder has edited over 20 textbooks. He is one of the founding co-editors of the journal Alimentary Pharmacology & Therapeutics, and editor-in-chief of GastroHep.com. His main research interests have included the development of drugs for controlling gastric acid secretion and the pathogenesis and management of inflammatory bowel disease. His interests have included the effects of nighttime shiftwork on junior doctors and the design and implementation of junior doctors' rotas. He is a governor of St. Paul's School, London, and chairman of RotaGeek.com.
