= Charlotte Anderson =

Australian scientist, physician and academic (1915 – 2002)

Charlotte Anderson AM FRACP FRCP FACP FRCPCH
- Born: Charlotte Morrison Anderson; 20 March 1915; Melbourne, Victoria, Australia
- Died: 15 April 2002 (aged 87); Toorak, Victoria, Australia
- Education: University of Melbourne, BSc, MSc, MD
- Occupations: Scientist, physician, educator
- Medical career
- Institutions: University of Birmingham
- Sub-specialties: Paediatric gastroenterology

Charlotte Morrison Anderson (20 March 1915 – 15 April 2002) was an Australian scientist, physician and academic. She pioneered the field of paediatric gastroenterology working on health issues including cystic fibrosis and coeliac disease. She was the first woman professor of paediatrics in the United Kingdom.

== Early life and education ==
Anderson was born on 20 March 1915 in Melbourne, Australia. She attended high school in the city, going onto study science at the University of Melbourne, graduating with honours in 1936. The following year she completed a Masters of Science. For several years she worked as a research scientist before returning to university to study medicine, graduating in 1945 with honours. In 1955 became a Doctor of Medicine from the University of Melbourne with the thesis entitled "Diagnosis, Aetiology and Treatment of Coeliac Disease".

== Career ==
After working in hospitals in Melbourne, she travelled to England in 1950 aboard a ship, employed as the ship's doctor. She worked as a research fellow with Sir Wilfrid Sheldon at Great Ormond Street Hospital researching coeliac disease, then Institute of Child Health, Birmingham working with Alistair Frazer and Jack French who were studying fat absorption in the disease. Their work identified that the gluten in flour had a harmful effect on fat absorption in children with coeliac disease.

Anderson returned to Australia in 1953 to continue her research, taking up a position as a senior researcher at Melbourne's Royal Children's Hospital. While there she started Australia's first cystic fibrosis clinic. She led a team of researchers who worked on intestinal malabsorption in children.

In 1958 she developed a test that accurately diagnosis of cystic fibrosis, and a technique for biopsying the small intestines of children.

In 1961, she discovered an "Unusual causes of steatorrhea in infancy" which was later identified as the chylomicron retention disease which also bears her name (Anderson's disease)

She studied the role of gluten in coeliac disease and worked to develop gluten-free diets.

Anderson was the first woman professor of paediatrics in the United Kingdom. She was appointed Leonard Parsons Professor of Paediatrics at the University of Birmingham Medical School in 1968 (Note: Some sources erroneously refer to Anderson as the first woman professor at Birmingham. That was in fact Hilda Lloyd, in 1944.) and remained there until 1980, when she returned to Melbourne, her place of birth.

== Awards and recognition ==
In recognition of her contribution to medicine, Anderson received several fellowships and awards.

- Fellow, Royal Australasian College of Physicians (1967)
- Fellow, Royal College of Physicians (1971)
- Fellow, American College of Physicians (1975)
- Fellow, Royal College of Paediatrics and Child Health (1996)
- Member, Order of Australia, for services to medicine (1997)
