= Hilda Lloyd =

British physician and surgeon

- Dame Hilda Lloyd (1891–1982), DBE, President of the Royal College of Obstetricians and Gynaecologists (1951) by Anthony Devas
- Born: 11 August 1891
- Died: 18 July 1982
- Education: King Edward VI High School for Girls, University of Birmingham
- Occupations: Surgeon, obstetrician
- Employer: University of Birmingham
- Spouse(s): Bertram Arthur Lloyd, Baron Theodore Rose
- Awards: Dame Commander of the Order of the British Empire

Dame Hilda Nora Lloyd, DBE (née Shufflebotham; 11 Aug 1891–18 July 1982) was a British physician and surgeon. She was the first woman professor at the University of Birmingham, and the first to be elected as president of the Royal College of Obstetricians and Gynaecologists.

== Early life ==
Lloyd was born on 11 August 1891 in Balsall Heath, Birmingham, to master grocer John Shufflebotham and Emma Amelia Jenkins. The younger of two daughters, she attended King Edward VI High School, Edgbaston, before entering Birmingham University (Interc BSc Pure Science, 1914, MBChB Medicine, 1916).

== Career ==
After house officer posts in London, she returned to Birmingham University as a resident in obstetrics and gynaecology, and passed her FRCS in 1920. She was particularly concerned with the problems of urban poor women, such as STDs and illegal abortions. The "flying squads" she pioneered helped to save the lives of mothers and babies who would otherwise have died. She became a lecturer at Birmingham in 1934, and was the first female professor there, from 1944. (Note: Charlotte Anderson was the first woman professor of paediatrics in the United Kingdom. She was appointed Leonard Parsons Professor of Paediatrics at the University of Birmingham Medical School in 1968. Some sources erroneously refer to her as the first woman professor at Birmingham.) She became chair of Obstetrics and Gynaecology in 1946. She was, in 1949, the first woman to be elected president of the Royal College of Obstetricians and Gynaecologists and in 1950, she became the first woman on the General Medical Council. (Note: Christine Murrell was actually elected to the GMC in September 1933, but never took the seat due to her death the following month.)

== Personal life ==
In 1930, she married Bertram Arthur Lloyd, a pathologist who became a professor of forensic medicine at Birmingham University two years later; they had no children. Lloyd died in 1948 after she had nursed him through a lengthy period of ill health.

She married in 1949 Baron Theodore Rose (1892–1978), her former classmate and a widower.

She died on 18 July 1982 in Clent, Worcestershire, after having a stroke.

== Recognition and legacy ==
Lloyd was appointed a Dame Commander of the Order of the British Empire (DBE) in the 1951 Birthday Honours and made an Honorary LLD by the University of Birmingham in 1958.

A 1951 bust of Lloyd by Jacob Epstein is in the collection of the University of Birmingham. The Royal College of Obstetricians and Gynaecologists has a 1951 portrait in oil by Anthony Devas, in which Lloyd is wearing the college's presidential robes. She is commemorated by a blue plaque at Birmingham Women's Hospital. The Dame Hilda Lloyd Network, a research network for women's health based in the West Midlands, is named in her honour.
