= Briggs affair =

Scientific misconduct scandal

The Briggs affair refers to an incident during the 1980s whereby an English biochemist, Michael Harvey Briggs, was forced to resign from his position at Deakin University in Australia, after it was discovered he had faked results pertaining to the contraceptive pill.

== Overview ==
Michael Harvey Briggs (20 August 1935 – 28 November 1986) was an English biochemist at Deakin University in Melbourne. He had previously worked for Schering Pharmaceuticals, now part of Bayer.

Concerns about Briggs' work were first raised in 1983, although it took years for the fraud to be discovered. Some people who spoke out received threats. Briggs resigned by November 1985 and moved to Spain, which impeded the investigation against him. Investigative journalist Brian Deer found Briggs in Spain, where he confessed to scientific fraud; making up evidence.

Briggs claimed to have conducted animal research on beagles at Deakin, which could not have been possible, as well as use of a hormone not available in Australia. Briggs was found not to have a PhD from Cornell University as he claimed. Briggs died in November 1986 from "heart failure after a digestive haemorrhage and cirrhosis of the liver".

Historian Jan Sapp's materials about the affair have been collated at the University of Melbourne. A report into the affair was conducted by Margery Ramsay in 1988, which was going to be the basis of a book subtitled gross scientific misconduct. Briggs's daughter has published a book about her father, titled The Scientist Who Wasn't There: A true story of staggering deception.

== See also ==
- Milena Penkowa
- Jan Hendrik Schön
- List of scientific misconduct incidents
