= Wakefield MMR-autism fraud =

Fraudulent research

Fraudulent Lancet MMR vaccine-autism study
- From The Lancet, 28 Feb 1998
- Claims: Research linking the measles, mumps and rubella vaccination with autism
- Year proposed: 1998
- Original proponents: Andrew Wakefield

On 28 February 1998, a fraudulent research paper primarily authored by the English physician Andrew Wakefield, along with twelve other coauthors (titled "Ileal-lymphoid-nodular hyperplasia, non-specific colitis, and pervasive developmental disorder in children"), was published in The Lancet, a British medical journal. The paper falsely claimed causative links between the measles, mumps, and rubella (MMR) vaccine and colitis, and between colitis and autism. The fraud involved data bias and manipulation, and two undisclosed conflicts of interest. It was exposed in a lengthy Sunday Times investigation by reporter Brian Deer, resulting in the paper's retraction in February 2010 and Wakefield's being discredited and struck off the UK medical register three months later. In the paper, Wakefield fabricated evidence to suggest a new "syndrome" existed, which he called "autistic enterocolitis". Wakefield had been employed by a lawyer representing parents in lawsuits against vaccine producers, and had reportedly earned up to US$43 million per year selling diagnostic kits for the non-existent syndrome he claimed to have discovered. He also held a patent to a rival measles vaccine at the time.

The scientific consensus on vaccines and autism is that there is no connection between MMR (or any other vaccine) and autism.

== 1998 The Lancet paper ==
In February 1998, a group led by Andrew Wakefield published a paper in the British medical journal The Lancet, supported by a press conference at the Royal Free Hospital in London, where the research was carried out. This paper reported on twelve children with developmental disorders referred to the hospital and described a constellation of bowel symptoms, as well as endoscopy and biopsy findings, that were said to be evidence of a new "syndrome" that Wakefield would later call "autistic enterocolitis". The paper described MMR vaccination as the "apparent precipitating event", tabulated the parents of eight of the twelve children as linking their developmental symptoms with MMR vaccination, suggested the connection between autism and the gastrointestinal pathologies was "real", and called for further research. Nevertheless, the paper admitted that the research did not "prove" an association between the MMR vaccine and autism.

At a press conference accompanying the paper's publication, later criticized as "science by press conference", Wakefield said that he thought it prudent to use single vaccines instead of the MMR triple vaccine until this could be ruled out as an environmental trigger. Wakefield said, "I can't support the continued use of these three vaccines given in combination until this issue has been resolved." In a video news release issued by the hospital to broadcasters in advance of the press conference, he called for MMR vaccine to be "suspended in favour of the single vaccines". In a BBC interview, Wakefield's mentor, Roy Pounder, who was not a coauthor, "admitted the study was controversial". He added: "In hindsight it may be a better solution to give the vaccinations separately ... When the vaccinations were given individually there was no problem." These suggestions were supported neither by Wakefield's coauthors nor any scientific evidence.

British television coverage of the press conference was intense, but press interest was mixed. The Guardian and the Independent reported it on their front pages, while the Daily Mail only gave the story a minor mention in the middle of the paper, and the Sun did not cover it.

== Controversy over MMR ==
Multiple subsequent studies failed to find any link between the MMR vaccine, colitis, and autism. In March 1998, a panel of 37 scientific experts set up by the Medical Research Council, headed by Professor Sir John Pattison found "no evidence to indicate any link" between the MMR vaccine and colitis or autism in children.

Public concern over Wakefield's claims of a possible link between MMR and autism gained momentum in 2001 and 2002, after he published further papers suggesting that the immunisation programme was not safe. These were a review paper with no new evidence, published in a minor journal, and two papers on laboratory work that he said showed that measles virus had been found in tissue samples taken from children who had autism and bowel problems. There was wide media coverage including distressing anecdotal evidence from parents, and political coverage attacking the health service and government peaked with unmet demands that Prime minister Tony Blair reveal whether his infant son, Leo, had been given the vaccine. It was the biggest science story of 2002, with 1257 articles mostly written by non-expert commentators. In the period January to September 2002, 32% of the stories written about MMR mentioned Leo Blair, as opposed to only 25% that mentioned Wakefield. Less than a third of the stories mentioned the overwhelming evidence that MMR is safe. The paper, press conference and video sparked a major health scare in the United Kingdom. As a result of the scare, full confidence in MMR fell from 59% to 41% after publication of the Wakefield research. In 2001, 26% of family doctors felt the government had failed to prove there was no link between MMR, autism, and bowel disease. In his book Bad Science, Ben Goldacre describes the MMR vaccine scare as one of the "three all-time classic bogus science stories" by the British newspapers (the other two are the Arpad Pusztai affair about genetically modified crops, and Chris Malyszewicz and the MRSA hoax).

A 2003 survey of 366 family doctors in the UK reported that 77% of them would advise giving the MMR vaccine to a child with a close family history of autism, and that 3% of them thought that autism could sometimes be caused by the MMR vaccine. A similar survey in 2004 found that these percentages changed to 82% and at most 2%, respectively, and that confidence in MMR had been increasing over the previous two years.

A factor in the controversy is that only the combined vaccine is available through the UK National Health Service. As of 2010 there are no single vaccines for measles, mumps and rubella licensed for use in the UK. Prime Minister Tony Blair gave support to the programme, arguing that the vaccine was safe enough for his own son, Leo, but refusing on privacy grounds to state whether Leo had received the vaccine; in contrast, the subsequent Prime Minister, Gordon Brown, explicitly confirmed that his son has been immunised. Cherie Blair confirmed that Leo had been given the MMR vaccination when promoting her autobiography.

The government stressed that administration of the combined vaccine instead of separate vaccines decreases the risk of children catching the disease while waiting for full immunisation coverage. The combined vaccine's two injections results in less pain and distress to the child than the six injections required by separate vaccines, and the extra clinic visits required by separate vaccinations increases the likelihood of some being delayed or missed altogether; vaccination uptake significantly increased in the UK when MMR was introduced in 1988. Health professionals have heavily criticized media coverage of the controversy for triggering a decline in vaccination rates. No scientific basis has been found for preferring separate vaccines, or for using any particular interval between them.

In 2001, Mark Berelowitz, one of the co-authors of the paper, said "I am certainly not aware of any convincing evidence for the hypothesis of a link between MMR and autism". The Canadian Paediatric Society, the Centers for Disease Control and Prevention, the Institute of Medicine of the National Academy of Sciences, and the UK National Health Service have all concluded that there is no link between the MMR vaccine and autism, and a 2011 journal article described the vaccine–autism connection as "the most damaging medical hoax of the last 100 years".

== Newspaper investigation ==
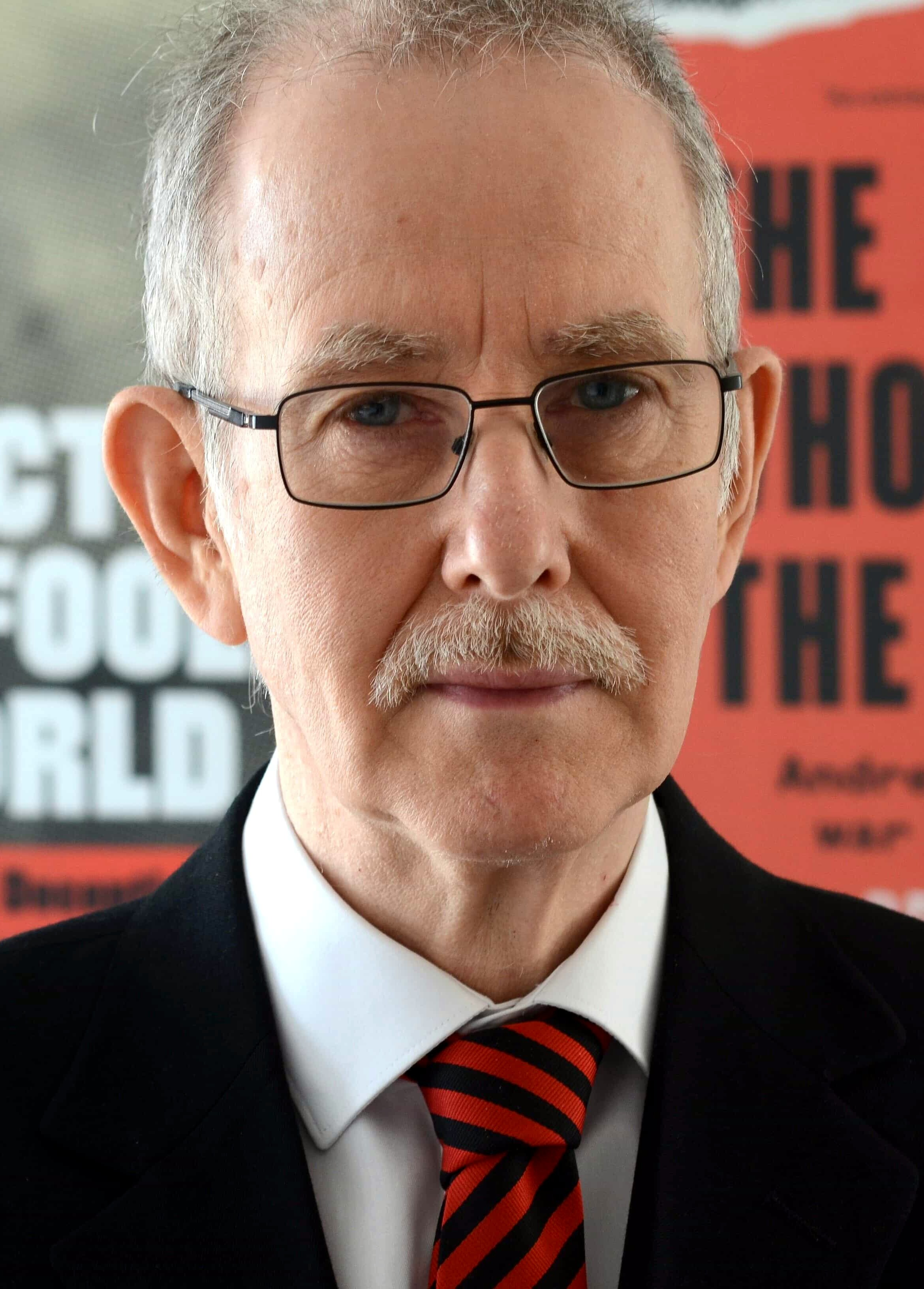
Brian Deer in 2025

=== Conflict of interest ===
Public understanding of the claims sharply changed in February 2004 with revelations by The Sunday Times of an undisclosed conflict of interest on Wakefield's part in that, two years before the paper's publication, he had been approached by Richard Barr, a lawyer of Justice, Awareness and Basic Support, who was looking for an expert witness to start a planned class action regarding alleged "vaccine damage". Barr hired Wakefield at £150 per hour, plus expenses, and only then did they recruit the twelve children, actively seeking the parents of cases that might imply a connection between MMR and autism. Barr and Wakefield convinced the UK Legal Aid Board, a UK government organization to give financial support to people who could not afford access to justice, to assign £55,000 to fund the initial stage of the research. According to journalist Brian Deer, the project was intended to create evidence for the court case, but this only became publicly known six years after the Lancet report, with the newspaper's first disclosures.

Based on Deer's evidence, the Lancet's editor-in-chief Richard Horton said Wakefield's paper should have never been published because its findings were "entirely flawed". Although Wakefield maintained that the legal aid funding was for a separate, unpublished study (a position later rejected by a panel of the UK General Medical Council), the editors of The Lancet judged that the funding source should have been disclosed to them. Horton wrote, "It seems obvious now that had we appreciated the full context in which the work reported in the 1998 Lancet paper by Wakefield and colleagues was done, publication would not have taken place in the way that it did." Several of Wakefield's co-researchers also strongly criticized the lack of disclosure.

=== No ethical approval ===
Among Deer's earliest reported allegations was that, contrary to a statement in the paper, Wakefield's research on the 12 children was conducted without any institutional review board authorization—a claim quickly denied in February 2004 by both the paper's authors and the Lancet. The paper itself said, "Ethical approval and consent. Investigations were approved by the Ethical Practices Committee of the Royal Free Hospital NHS Trust, and parents gave informed consent." The dispute over this would remain unresolved, however, until settled in the English High Court in March 2012, where a senior judge vindicated Deer. Quoting the text, Justice Mitting ruled, "This statement was untrue and should not have been included in the paper."

=== Retraction of an interpretation ===
The Lancet and many other medical journals require papers to include the authors' conclusions about their research, known as the "interpretation". The summary of the 1998 Lancet paper ended as follows:

Interpretation We identified associated gastrointestinal disease and developmental regression in a group of previously normal children, which was generally associated in time with possible environmental triggers.

In March 2004, immediately following the news of the conflict of interest allegations, ten of Wakefield's 12 coauthors retracted this interpretation, while insisting that the possibility of a distinctive gastrointestinal condition in children with autism merited further investigation. However, a separate study of children with gastrointestinal disturbances found no difference between those with autism spectrum disorders and those without, with respect to the presence of measles virus RNA in the bowel; it also found that gastrointestinal symptoms and the onset of autism were unrelated in time to the administration of MMR vaccine.

Later in 2004, the newspaper's investigation also found that Wakefield had a further conflict of interest in the form of a patent for a single measles vaccine, had manipulated evidence, and had broken other ethical codes. The Lancet paper was partially retracted in 2004 and fully retracted in 2010, when Lancet's editor-in-chief Richard Horton described it as "utterly false" and said that the journal had been deceived. Wakefield was found guilty by the General Medical Council of serious professional misconduct in May 2010 and was struck off the medical register, meaning he could no longer practise as a doctor in the UK. In 2011, Deer provided further information on Wakefield's improper research practices to the British Medical Journal, which in a signed editorial described the original paper as fraudulent.

Deer continued his reporting in a Channel 4 Dispatches television documentary, MMR: What They Didn't Tell You, broadcast on 18 November 2004. This documentary reported that Wakefield had applied for patents on a single measles vaccine that claimed to be a potential rival of MMR, and that he knew of test results from his own laboratory at the Royal Free Hospital that contradicted his own claims. Wakefield's patent application was also noted in Paul Offit's 2008 book, Autism's False Prophets.

In January 2005, Wakefield sued Channel 4, 20/20 Productions, and the investigative reporter Brian Deer, who presented the Dispatches programme. However, after two years of litigation, and the revelation of more than £400,000 in undisclosed payments by lawyers to Wakefield, he discontinued his action and paid all the defendants' costs.

In 2006, Deer reported in The Sunday Times that Wakefield had been paid £435,643, plus expenses, by British trial lawyers attempting to prove that the vaccine was dangerous, with the undisclosed payments beginning two years before the Lancet paper's publication. This funding came from the UK legal aid fund, a fund intended to provide legal services to the poor.

=== Support for Wakefield ===
Despite The Sunday Times disclosures, Wakefield continued to find support. Melanie Phillips, an influential columnist with the Daily Mail, called the reporting of Wakefield's contract with the solicitor Richard Barr "a smear whose timing should raise a few eyebrows."

According to Deer writing in the BMJ, the General Medical Council hearing was also criticized by Richard Horton, the Lancet editor: "My own view is that the GMC is no place to continue this debate. But the process has started and it will be impossible to stop."

=== Manipulation of data ===
The Sunday Times continued the investigation, and on 8 February 2009, Brian Deer reported that Wakefield had "fixed" results and "manipulated" patient data in the Lancet, creating the appearance of a link with autism. Wakefield falsely denied these allegations, and even filed a complaint with the Press Complaints Commission (PCC) over this article on 13 March 2009. The complaint was expanded by a 20 March 2009 addendum by Wakefield's publicist. In July 2009, the PCC stated that it was staying any investigation regarding the Sunday Times article, pending the conclusion of the GMC investigation. Wakefield did not pursue his complaint, which Deer then published along with a statement saying he and The Sunday Times rejected the complaint as "false and disingenuous in all material respects", and that the action had been suspended by the PCC in February 2010.

=== UK General Medical Council inquiry ===
Responding to the first Sunday Times reports, the General Medical Council (GMC), which is responsible for licensing doctors and supervising medical ethics in the UK, launched an investigation into the affair. The GMC brought the case itself, not citing any specific complaints, claiming that an investigation was in the public interest. The then-secretary of state for health, John Reid, called for a GMC investigation, which Wakefield himself welcomed. During a debate in the House of Commons, on 15 March 2004, Dr. Evan Harris, a Liberal Democrat MP, called for a judicial inquiry into the ethical aspects of the case, even suggesting it might be conducted by the CPS. In June 2006 the GMC confirmed that they would hold a disciplinary hearing of Wakefield.

The GMC's Fitness to Practise Panel first met on 16 July 2007 to consider the cases of Wakefield, Professor John Angus Walker-Smith, and Professor Simon Harry Murch. All faced charges of serious professional misconduct. The GMC examined, among other ethical points, whether Wakefield and his colleagues obtained the required approvals for the tests they performed on the children; the data-manipulation charges reported in the Sunday Times, which surfaced after the case was prepared, were not at question in the hearings. The GMC stressed that it would not be assessing the validity of competing scientific theories on MMR and autism. The GMC alleged that the trio acted unethically and dishonestly in preparing the research into the MMR vaccine. They denied the allegations. The case proceeded in front of a GMC Fitness to Practise panel of three medical and two lay members.

On 28 January 2010, the GMC panel delivered its decision on the facts of the case, finding four counts of dishonesty and 12 involving the abuse of developmentally disabled children. Wakefield was found to have acted "dishonestly and irresponsibly" and to have acted with "callous disregard" for the children involved in his study, conducting unnecessary and invasive tests. The panel found that the trial was improperly conducted without the approval of an independent ethics committee, and that Wakefield had multiple undeclared conflicts of interest.

On 24 May 2010, the GMC panel ordered that he be struck off the medical register. John Walker-Smith was also found guilty of serious professional misconduct and struck off the medical register, but that decision was reversed on appeal to the High Court in 2012, because the GMC panel had failed to decide whether Walker-Smith actually thought he was doing research in the guise of clinical investigation and treatment. The High Court criticised "a number of" wrong conclusions by the disciplinary panel and its "inadequate and superficial reasoning". Simon Murch was found not guilty.

In response to the GMC investigation and findings, the editors of the Lancet announced on 2 February 2010 that they "fully retract this paper from the published record". The Lancet's editor-in-chief Richard Horton described it as "utterly false" and said that the journal had been deceived.

The Hansard text for 16 March 2010 reported Lord McColl asking the Government whether it had plans to recover legal aid money paid to the experts in connection with the measles, mumps and rubella/measles and rubella vaccine litigation. Lord Bach, Ministry of Justice dismissed this possibility.

=== Full retraction and fraud revelations ===
In an April 2010 report in The BMJ, Deer expanded on the laboratory aspects of his findings recounting how normal clinical histopathology results generated by the Royal Free Hospital were later changed in the medical school to abnormal results, published in the Lancet. Deer wrote an article in The BMJ casting doubt on the "autistic enterocolitis" that Wakefield claimed to have discovered. In the same edition, Deirdre Kelly, President of the European Society of Pediatric Gastroenterology and Nutrition and the Editor of the Journal of Pediatric Gastroenterology and Nutrition expressed some concern about The BMJ publishing this article while the GMC proceedings were underway.

On 5 January 2011, The BMJ published the first of a series of articles by Brian Deer, detailing how Wakefield and his colleagues had faked some of the data behind the 1998 Lancet article. By looking at the records and interviewing the parents, Deer found that for all 12 children in the Wakefield study, diagnoses had been tweaked or dates changed to fit the article's conclusion. Continuing BMJ series on 11 January 2011, Deer said that based upon documents he obtained under freedom of information legislation, Wakefield—in partnership with the father of one of the boys in the study—had planned to launch a venture on the back of an MMR vaccination scare that would profit from new medical tests and "litigation driven testing". The Washington Post reported that Deer said that Wakefield predicted he "could make more than $43 million a year from diagnostic kits" for the new condition, autistic enterocolitis. WebMD reported on Deer's BMJ report, saying that the $43 million predicted yearly profits would come from marketing kits for "diagnosing patients with autism" and that "the initial market for the diagnostic will be litigation-driven testing of patients with [autistic enterocolitis] from both the UK and the USA". According to WebMD, the BMJ article also claimed that the venture would succeed in marketing products and developing a replacement vaccine if "public confidence in the MMR vaccine was damaged".

In an editorial accompanying Deer's 2011 series, The BMJ said, "it has taken the diligent scepticism of one man, standing outside medicine and science, to show that the paper was in fact an elaborate fraud", and asked:

Who perpetrated this fraud? There is no doubt that it was Wakefield. Is it possible that he was wrong, but not dishonest: that he was so incompetent that he was unable to fairly describe the project, or to report even one of the 12 children's cases accurately? No. A great deal of thought and effort must have gone into drafting the paper to achieve the results he wanted: the discrepancies all led in one direction; misreporting was gross. Moreover, although the scale of the GMC's 217 day hearing precluded additional charges focused directly on the fraud, the panel found him guilty of dishonesty concerning the study's admissions criteria, its funding by the Legal Aid Board, and his statements about it afterwards.

Summarizing findings as of January 2011 in The BMJ, Deer set out the following analysis of the cases reported in the study:

The Lancet paper was a case series of 12 child patients; it reported a proposed "new syndrome" of enterocolitis and regressive autism and associated this with MMR as an "apparent precipitating event". But in fact:

- Three of nine children reported with regressive autism did not have autism diagnosed at all. Only one child clearly had regressive autism.
- Despite the paper claiming that all 12 children were "previously normal", five had documented pre-existing developmental concerns.
- Some children were reported to have experienced first behavioural symptoms within days of MMR, but the records documented these as starting some months after vaccination.
- In nine cases, unremarkable colonic histopathology results—noting no or minimal fluctuations in inflammatory cell populations—were changed after a medical school "research review" to "non-specific colitis".
- The parents of eight children were reported as blaming MMR, but 11 families made this allegation at the hospital. The exclusion of three allegations—all giving times to onset of problems in months—helped to create the appearance of a 14 day temporal link.
- Patients were recruited through anti-MMR campaigners, and the study was commissioned and funded for planned litigation.

In subsequent disclosures from the investigation, Deer obtained copies of unpublished gastrointestinal pathology reports on the children in the Lancet study that Wakefield had claimed showed "non-specific colitis" and "autistic enterocolitis". But expert analyses of these reports found bowel biopsies from the children to be overwhelmingly normal and with no evidence of any enterocolitis at all.

In September 2020, Johns Hopkins University Press published Deer's account of the fraud in his book The Doctor Who Fooled the World: Science, Deception, and the War on Vaccines. The book includes reporting of parents whose children were among the twelve recruited by Wakefield in the Lancet study. One described the paper as "fraudulent" while another complained of "outright fabrication".

== Aftermath ==
Characterised as "perhaps the most damaging medical hoax of the 20th Century", The Lancet paper led to a sharp drop in vaccination rates in the UK and Ireland. Promotion of the claimed link, which continues in anti-vaccination propaganda despite being refuted, led to an increase in the incidence of measles and mumps, resulting in deaths and serious permanent injuries. Following the initial claims in 1998, multiple large epidemiological studies were undertaken. Reviews of the evidence by the Centers for Disease Control and Prevention, the American Academy of Pediatrics, the Institute of Medicine of the US National Academy of Sciences, the UK National Health Service, and the Cochrane Library all found no link between the MMR vaccine and autism. Physicians, medical journals, and editors have described Wakefield's actions as fraudulent and tied them to epidemics and deaths.

Among commentators drawing on Deer's investigation, academic Peter N. Steinmetz summarizes six fabrications and falsifications in the paper itself and in Wakefield's response: findings of non-specific colitis; timing of MMR vaccine administration and first behavioral symptoms; findings of regressive autism; ethics consent statement; conflict of interest statement; and methods of patient referral.

Wakefield has continued to defend his research and conclusions, saying there was no fraud, hoax or profit motive. He has subsequently become known for anti-vaccination activism. In 2016, Wakefield directed the anti-vaccination film Vaxxed: From Cover-Up to Catastrophe.

== See also ==
- Vaccine hesitancy
- Folk epidemiology of autism
