= Michael Harvey Briggs =

English biochemist (1935–1986)

- Born: 20 August 1935; England
- Died: 28 November 1986 (aged 51); Marbella, Spain
- Education: Liverpool University (BS); Cornell University (PhD); Victoria University of Wellington (DSc)
- Known for: Hormonal contraception Briggs affair
- Spouse: Maxine Briggs
- Scientific career
- Fields: Biochemistry
- Workplaces: Cornell University; Victoria University of Wellington; California Institute of Technology; University of Sussex; University of Zambia; The Alfred Hospital; Deakin University
- Thesis: Studies on the Biochemistry of Biotin and Its Analogues (1959)

Michael Harvey Briggs (20 August 1935 – 28 November 1986) was an English biochemist who made important contributions to prebiotic chemistry and reproductive physiology. Since working for Schering Pharmaceuticals during the 1960s, he was an advocate of the benefits of the company's hormone-based pregnancy test, Primodos. By 1980s, Primodos was sold worldwide and more than 10 million women were estimated to use it, and then became controversial due to its alleged adverse effects, particular of abortion and birth defects. A number of Briggs' research on Primodos and contraceptives were eventually found to contain fabricated data. As his employer, the Deakin University in Geelong, Australia, conducted an inquiry into his research misconduct, he resigned from his office. While living in Spain he made a confession on his research frauds.

== Biography ==
Briggs was born in England on 20 August 1935. He was educated at the Manchester Grammar School in Manchester. He completed his bachelor's course at the Liverpool University. Between 1956 and 1959, he worked at Cornell University in New York, US, as a teaching assistant at the same time pursuing a doctoral degree. In 1959, he obtained his PhD on the thesis "Studies on the Biochemistry of Biotin and Its Analogues".

In 1959, Briggs was appointed to the Department of Chemistry as lecturer in biochemistry at the Victoria University of Wellington, New Zealand. He earned a DSc from Victoria University. In 1962, he became a Senior Fellow at the California Institute of Technology and worked at the Jet Propulsion Laboratory, under NASA programme. In 1963, he became Director of Research at Analytical Laboratories Limited in Corsham, England. In 1966, he was appointed a Visiting Professor at the University of Sussex, while working for the English branch of the German company, Schering Pharmaceuticals. In 1970, he became full professor of biochemistry at the University of Zambia.

In 1973, Briggs received appointment as Director of Biochemistry at The Alfred Hospital in Melbourne, Australia. In 1975, he became Head of the School of Applied Sciences at the Gordon Institute of Technology in Geelong. In 1976, higher education courses of the Gordon Institute of Technology was merged into the newly established Deakin University, with the vocational courses administered as the Gordon Technical College (later renamed the Gordon Institute of TAFE). Briggs then became Professor of Human Biology at Deakin University simultaneously holding a position of Planning Dean of Sciences.

Briggs resigned from his positions at Deakin University in September (or October, according to the university's record) 1985 as he was a subject of research misconduct. He moved to Marbella in Costa del Sol, southern Spain and died on 28 November 1986 following "heart failure after a digestive haemorrhage and cirrhosis of the liver". He was survived by his wife, Maxine (née Staniford), who was a British-registered family planning doctor and a long-term research partner working at The Geelong Hospital. He had two children from his first marriage.

== Scientific contributions ==
=== Vitamins and diseases ===
Briggs started his research career on the study of vitamin B with biotin as his primary focus for his PhD thesis in 1959. He wrote several scientific papers in the world's leading journals between 1959 and 1962 – such as the role of biotin in cancers and the chemistry of animal venoms published in Science Progress, functions of lactate dehydrogenase in insects and involvement of vitamins and coenzymes in cancer due to butter yellow (methyl yellow) in Nature, influence of enzymes and ascorbic acid in amino acid metabolism of insects in Science, the link between vitamin deficiency and schizophrenia in The British Medical Journal, and the molecular biology of learning and memory in Psychological Review. In 1962, working with Natalie Harvey at the Victoria University of Wellington, he reported an experimental study of the association of enzymes involved in the metabolism of an amino acid phenylalanine with the brain disease schizophrenia.

=== Origin of life ===
Briggs showed interest in the origin of life studies while working at Cornell University. At the NASA's Jet Propulsion Laboratory in Caltech, Briggs focussed on prebiotic chemistry (the chemical conditions for the origin of life). He was one of the first scientists who analysed and understood the importance of meteorite samples (carbonaceous chondrites) as a source of information for the chemical origin of life. In 1963, he explained that complex organic compounds including hydrocarbons, amino acids, sugars and fatty acids detected in the meteorites indicate that life, specifically the organic compounds for life, could have formed on primitive Earth and other parts of the Solar System. In his 1963 experiment, he concluded that some carbon and sulphur compounds in meteorites were formed in an extra-terrestrial environment.

By the early 1960s scientists claimed that microscopic structure identified in many meteorites could be microorganisms, suggesting the origin of life outside of Earth. Briggs published in Nature a series of his experiments about these miscoscopic structures. In 1961, he analysed Mokoia meteorite but could not conclude on whether or not the microscopic bodies were of earth origin or formed in outer space. In 1962, he analysed Orgueil, Murray and Mokoia meteorites observing that the microscopic bodies were not of extraterrestrial origin but contaminations of microbes on earth. In 1963, he and Gregg Mamikunian studied other available meteorites concluding that the microscopic bodies were organic particles and minerals present in the earth. Briggs and Mamikunian edited a book on this subject titled Current Aspects of Exobiology in 1965.

Human biology and birth control

In the late 1960s, Briggs started working on human reproduction biology with Maxine Staniford whom he met at Schering Chemicals Limited in Sussex. In 1960, they organised (as editors) a workshop on prostate, at the Royal Society of Medicine, London, which was supported by the Marie Curie Foundation. The couple's first scientific work was on the relationship between blood copper level in women who used norethisterone acetate (a birth-control pill developed at Schering). Their paper in Nature in 1970 stated that the compound showed better effect than the commercially available contraceptive pill (Minovlar). They published the follow-up findings in The British Medical Journal. The same year, Briggs published a book, Advances in Steroid Biochemistry and Pharmacology (in two volumes), in which he wrote a chapter "Metabolic effects of steroid contraceptives" (in the second volume) with Staniford (by then Maxine Briggs). They continued to work and publish prolifically till 1983.

== Research misconduct ==
In 1982, there were indications that Briggs' research on contraceptive pills had several irregularities – huge data produced in a short time, high number of participants in experimental trials, absence of facilities he reportedly used and inconsistent conclusions he made. In 1985, the Deakin University set up an inquiry to investigate on Briggs' research conducts. Briggs submitted his resignation and the university made a closure to the inquiry. He tried to live in seclusion and moved to Costa del Sol, where he was eventually tracked down by The Sunday Times. He confessed his fraudulent research findings to Brian Deer, social affairs correspondent of The Sunday Times, who reported it on 28 September 1986.
