= MMR vaccine and autism =

False claims of a link between the MMR vaccine and autism

Claims of a link between the measles, mumps, and rubella (MMR) vaccine and autism have been extensively investigated and have been found to be false. The link was first suggested in the early 1990s and came to public notice largely as a result of the 1998 Lancet MMR autism fraud, characterised as "perhaps the most damaging medical hoax of the last 100 years". The fraudulent research paper, authored by Andrew Wakefield and published in The Lancet, falsely claimed the vaccine was linked to colitis and autism spectrum disorders. The paper was retracted in 2010 but is still cited by anti-vaccine activists.

The claims in the paper were widely reported, leading to a sharp drop in vaccination rates in the UK and Ireland. Promotion of the claimed link, which continues in anti-vaccination propaganda despite being refuted, has led to an increase in the incidence of measles and mumps, resulting in deaths and serious permanent injuries. Following the initial claims in 1998, multiple large epidemiological studies were undertaken. Reviews of the evidence by the Centers for Disease Control and Prevention, the American Academy of Pediatrics, the Institute of Medicine of the US National Academy of Sciences, the UK National Health Service, and the Cochrane Library all found no link between the MMR vaccine and autism. Physicians, medical journals, and editors have described Wakefield's actions as fraudulent and tied them to epidemics and deaths.

An investigation by journalist Brian Deer found that Wakefield, the author of the original research paper linking the vaccine to autism, had multiple undeclared conflicts of interest, had manipulated evidence, and had broken other ethical codes. The Lancet paper was partially retracted in 2004 and fully retracted in 2010, when Lancet's editor-in-chief Richard Horton described it as "utterly false" and said that the journal had been deceived. Wakefield was found guilty by the General Medical Council of serious professional misconduct in May 2010 and was struck off the Medical Register, meaning he could no longer practise as a physician in the UK. In January 2011, Deer published a series of reports in the British Medical Journal, which in a signed editorial stated of the journalist, "It has taken the diligent scepticism of one man, standing outside medicine and science, to show that the paper was in fact an elaborate fraud." The scientific consensus is that there is no link between the MMR vaccine and autism and that the vaccine's benefits greatly outweigh its potential risks.

== Background ==
=== Revaccination campaign ===
In the wake of the measles outbreaks, which occurred in England in 1992, and on the basis of analyses of seroepidemiological data combined with mathematical modeling, British Health authorities predicted a major resurgence of measles in school-age children. Two strategies were then examined: either to target vaccination at all children without a history of prior measles vaccination or to immunize all children irrespective of vaccination history. In November 1994, the latter option was chosen and a national measles and rubella vaccination campaign, described as "one of the most ambitious vaccination initiatives that Britain has undertaken" was commenced: within one month, 92% of the 7.1 million schoolchildren in England aged 5–16 years received measles and rubella (MR) vaccine.

=== MMR litigation starts ===
In April 1994, Richard Barr, a solicitor, succeeded in winning legal aid for the pursuit of a class action lawsuit against the manufacturers of MMR vaccines under the UK Consumer Protection Act 1987. The class action case was aimed at Aventis Pasteur, SmithKline Beecham, and Merck, manufacturers respectively of Immravax, Pluserix-MMR and MMR II. This suit, based on a claim that MMR is a defective product and should not have been used, was the first big class action lawsuit funded by the Legal Aid Board (which became the Legal Services Commission, which in turn was replaced by the Legal Aid Agency) after its formation in 1988. Noticing two publications from Andrew Wakefield that explored the role of measles virus in Crohn's disease and inflammatory bowel disease, Barr contacted Wakefield for his expertise. According to Wakefield supporters, the two men first met on 6 January 1996. The Legal Services Commission halted proceedings in September 2003, citing a high probability of failure based on the medical evidence, bringing an end to the first case of research funding by the LSC.

== 1998 The Lancet paper ==
Wakefield's paper "Ileal-lymphoid-nodular hyperplasia, non-specific colitis, and pervasive developmental disorder in children" was published in The Lancet on 28 February 1998. An investigation by journalist Brian Deer found that Wakefield had multiple undeclared conflicts of interest, had manipulated evidence, and had broken other ethical codes. Based on Deer's findings, Peter N. Steinmetz summarizes six fabrications and falsifications in the paper itself and in Wakefield's response in the areas of findings of non-specific colitis; behavioral symptoms; findings of regressive autism; ethics consent statement; conflict of interest statement; and methods of patient referral. The Lancet paper was partially retracted in 2004 and fully retracted in 2010, when The Lancet's editor-in-chief Richard Horton described it as "utterly false" and said that the journal had been deceived. Wakefield was found guilty of serious professional misconduct by the General Medical Council in May 2010 and was struck off the Medical Register, barring him from practicing medicine in the UK. In 2011, Deer provided further information on Wakefield's improper research practices to the British Medical Journal, which in a signed editorial described the original paper as fraudulent.

The scientific consensus is that there is no link between the MMR vaccine and autism and that the vaccine's benefits greatly outweigh its risks. However, by the time that scientists had shown the narrative to be false, it had become part of the lay understanding of autism. The narrative was easy to understand and apparently consistent with anecdotal evidence of children receiving autism diagnoses shortly after having been vaccinated.

By the time it was retracted, all authors other than Wakefield had requested their names be removed from the publication.

Fiona Godlee, editor of The BMJ, said in January 2011:

The original paper has received so much media attention, with such potential to damage public health, that it is hard to find a parallel in the history of medical science. Many other medical frauds have been exposed but usually more quickly after publication and on less important health issues.

== Media role ==
Observers have criticized the involvement of mass media in the controversy, what is known as 'science by press conference', alleging that the media provided Wakefield's study with more credibility than it deserved. A March 2007 paper in BMC Public Health by Shona Hilton, Mark Petticrew, and Kate Hunt postulated that media reports on Wakefield's study had "created the misleading impression that the evidence for the link with autism was as substantial as the evidence against" through an attempt to create "balanced reporting". Earlier papers in Communication in Medicine and British Medical Journal concluded that media reports provided a misleading picture of the level of support for Wakefield's hypothesis.

A 2007 editorial in Australian Doctor complained that some journalists had continued to defend Wakefield's study even after The Lancet had published the retraction by 10 of the study's 12 original authors, but noted that it was an investigative journalist, Brian Deer, who had played a leading role in exposing weaknesses in the study. PRWeek noted that after Wakefield was removed from the general medical register for misconduct in May 2010, 62% of respondents to a poll regarding the MMR controversy stated they did not feel that the media conducted responsible reporting on health issues.

A New England Journal of Medicine article examining the history of anti-vaccine activists said that opposition to vaccines has existed since the 19th century, but "now the antivaccinationists' media of choice are typically television and the Internet, including its social media outlets, which are used to sway public opinion and distract attention from scientific evidence". The editorial characterized anti-vaccine activists as people who "tend toward complete mistrust of government and manufacturers, conspiratorial thinking, denialism, low cognitive complexity in thinking patterns, reasoning flaws, and a habit of substituting emotional anecdotes for data", including people who range from those "unable to understand and incorporate concepts of risk and probability into science-grounded decision making" and those "who use deliberate mistruths, intimidation, falsified data, and threats of violence".

In a January 2011 editorial in The American Spectator, Robert M. Goldberg contended that evidence from the scientific community of issues with Wakefield's research "were undermined because the media allowed Wakefield and his followers to discredit the findings just by saying so".

Seth Mnookin, author of The Panic Virus, also partly blames the media for presenting a false balance between scientific evidence and people's personal experiences: "Reporting fell into this 'on the one hand, on the other hand' fallacy, this notion that if you have two sides that are disagreeing, that means that you should present both of them with equal weight."

Concerns have also been raised over the journal peer review system, which largely relies on trust among researchers, and the role of journalists reporting on scientific theories that they "are hardly in a position to question and comprehend". Neil Cameron, a historian who specializes in the history of science, writing for the Montreal Gazette, labeled the controversy a "failure of journalism" that resulted in unnecessary deaths, saying that: 1) The Lancet should not have published a study based on "statistically meaningless results" from only 12 cases; 2) the anti-vaccination crusade was continued by the satirical Private Eye magazine; and 3) a grapevine of worried parents and "nincompoop" celebrities fueled the widespread fears. The Gazette also reported that:

There is no guarantee that debunking the original study is going to sway all parents. Medical experts are going to have to work hard to try to undo the damage inflicted by what is apparently a rogue medical researcher whose work was inadequately vetted by a top-ranked international journal.

=== Folk epidemiology ===
Folk epidemiology of autism refers to the popular beliefs about the origin of autism. Without direct informed knowledge of autism, a complex disorder, members of the public are easily influenced by rumors and misinformation presented in the mass media and repeated on social media and the internet.

These misinformed beliefs persist even when contradicted by scientific evidence. Folk epidemiology persists because people seek, receive, and preferentially believe information that is consistent with their existing views; misjudge the reliability of their sources of information, and are misled by anecdotal evidence; and tend not to revise their opinions even when their original sources of information are shown to be wrong.

A June 2024 report in Ars Technica discusses recent research into popular beliefs about vaccines and autism in the US, finding lack of awareness of the CDC's clear stance against vaccines as a cause of autism. The article cites an April 2024 survey in which, "24 percent of US adults denied or disputed that the CDC ever said that", a result little changed from 2018. It also reports that a small but non-trivial percentage of Americans believe the vaccine definitely or probably causes autism (rising from 9% in 2021 to 10% in 2023). The research mainly comes from surveys by the Annenberg Public Policy Center.

== Litigation ==
During the 1980s and 1990s, a number of lawsuits were brought against manufacturers of vaccines, alleging the vaccines had caused physical and mental disorders in children. While these lawsuits were unsuccessful, they did lead to a large jump in the costs of the MMR vaccine, and pharmaceutical companies sought legislative protections. In 1993, Merck KGaA became the only company willing to sell MMR vaccines in the United States and the United Kingdom.

=== Italy ===
In June 2012, a local court in Rimini, Italy, ruled that the MMR vaccination had caused autism in a 15-month-old boy. The court relied heavily on the discredited Lancet paper and largely ignored the scientific evidence presented to it. The decision was appealed. On 13 February 2015, the decision was overturned by a Court of Appeals in Bologna.

=== Japan ===
The MMR scare caused a low percentage of mumps vaccination (less than 30%), which resulted in outbreaks in Japan. There were up to 2002 measles-caused deaths in Japan while there were none in the UK, but the extra deaths were attributed to Japan's application of the vaccine at a later age. A spokesman for the Ministry of Health said that the discontinuation had no effect in measles, but also mentioning that there were more deaths by measles while MMR was being used. In 1994 the government dropped the vaccination requirement for measles and rubella due to the 1993 MMR scare. It has been called a "measles exporter" by the US Centers for Disease Control and Prevention. As another consequence of the scare, in 2003, 7 million schoolchildren had not been vaccinated against rubella.

Autism rates continued to rise in Japan after the discontinuation of the MMR vaccine, which disproves any large-scale effect of vaccination, and means that the withdrawal of MMR in other countries is unlikely to cause a reduction in autism cases. The Japanese government does not recognize any link between MMR and autism. By 2003 it was still trying to find a combined vaccine to replace MMR.

It was later discovered that some of the vaccines were administered after their expiry date and that the MMR compulsory vaccination was only retracted after the death of three children and more than 2000 reports of adverse effects. By 1993 the Japanese government had paid $160,000 in compensation to the families of each of the three dead children. Other parents received no compensation because the government said that it was unproven that the MMR vaccine had been the cause; they decided to sue the manufacturer instead of the government. The Osaka district court ruled on 13 March 2003 that the death of two children (among numerous other serious conditions) had been indeed caused by Japan's strain of Urabe MMR. In 2006, the Osaka High Court stated in another ruling that the state was responsible for failing to properly supervise a manufacturer of the measles-mumps-rubella vaccine, which caused severe side effects in children.

=== United Kingdom ===
Commenced before the Civil Procedure Rules were promulgated, the MMR Litigation had its status as group litigation achieved by the then Lord Chief Justice's practice direction of 8 July 1999. On 8 June 2007, the High Court judge, Justice Keith, put an end to the group litigation because the withdrawal of legal aid by the legal services commission had made the pursuit of most of the claimants impossible. He ruled that all but two claims against pharmaceutical companies must be discontinued. The judge stressed that his ruling did not amount to a rejection of any of the claims that MMR had seriously damaged the children concerned.

A pressure group, JABS (Justice, Awareness and Basic Support), was established to represent families with children who, their parents said, were "vaccine-damaged". £15 million in public legal aid funding was spent on the litigation, of which £9.7 million went to solicitors and barristers, and £4.3 million to expert witnesses.

=== United States ===
The omnibus autism proceeding (OAP) is a coordinated proceeding before the Office of Special Masters of the U.S. Court of Federal Claims—commonly called the vaccine court. It is structured to facilitate the handling of nearly 5000 vaccine petitions involving claims that children who have received certain vaccinations have developed autism. The Petitioners' Steering Committee have claimed that MMR vaccines can cause autism, possibly in combination with thiomersal-containing vaccines. In 2007 three test cases were presented to test the claims about the combination; these cases failed. The vaccine court ruled against the plaintiffs in all three cases, stating that the evidence presented did not validate their claims that vaccinations caused autism in these specific patients or in general.

In some cases, the plaintiffs' attorneys opted out of the Omnibus Autism Proceedings, which were concerned solely with autism, and issues concerned with bowel disorders; they argued their cases in the regular vaccine court.

On 30 July 2007, the family of Bailey Banks, a child with pervasive developmental delay, won its case versus the Department of Health and Human Services. In a case listed as relating to "non-autistic developmental delay", Special Master Richard B. Abell ruled that the Banks had successfully demonstrated, "the MMR vaccine at issue actually caused the conditions from which Bailey suffered and continues to suffer." In his conclusion, he ruled that he was satisfied that MMR had caused a brain inflammation called acute disseminated encephalomyelitis (ADEM). He reached this conclusion because of two vaccine cases in 1994 and 2001, which had concluded, "ADEM can be caused by natural measles, mumps, and rubella infections, as well as by measles, mumps, and rubella vaccines."

In other cases, attorneys did not claim that vaccines caused autism; they sought compensation for encephalopathy, encephalitis, or seizure disorders.

== Research ==
The number of reported cases of autism increased dramatically in the 1990s and early 2000s. This increase is largely attributable to changes in diagnostic practices; it is not known how much, if any, growth came from real changes in autism's prevalence, and no causal connection to the MMR vaccine has been demonstrated.

In 2004, a meta review financed by the European Union assessed the evidence given in 120 other studies and considered unintended effects of the MMR vaccine, concluding that although the vaccine is associated with positive and negative side effects, a connection between MMR and autism was "unlikely". Also in 2004, a review article was published that concluded, "The evidence now is convincing that the measles–mumps–rubella vaccine does not cause autism or any particular subtypes of autistic spectrum disorder." A 2006 review of the literature regarding vaccines and autism found "[t]he bulk of the evidence suggests no causal relationship between the MMR vaccine and autism."

Sanofi Pasteur’s Tripedia DTaP vaccine automatically included autism on a long list of “adverse events” in 2005 due to unverified reports from consumers, although such reports did not "establish a causal relationship" to the vaccine at any point.

A 2007 case study used the figure in Wakefield's 1999 letter to The Lancet alleging a temporal association between MMR vaccination and autism to illustrate how a graph can misrepresent its data, and gave advice to authors and publishers to avoid similar misrepresentations in the future. A 2007 review of independent studies performed after the publication of Wakefield et al.'s original report found that the studies provided compelling evidence against the hypothesis that MMR is associated with autism. A review of the work conducted in 2004 for UK court proceedings but not revealed until 2007 found that the polymerase chain reaction analysis essential to the Wakefield et al. results was fatally flawed due to contamination, and that it could not have possibly detected the measles that it was supposed to have detected. A 2009 review of studies on links between vaccines and autism discussed the MMR vaccine controversy as one of three main hypotheses that epidemiological and biological studies failed to support.

Anti-vaccine activists have spread false claims about the absence of autism in North America's Amish population due to lower vaccination rates. A 2010 study, however, revealed that autism is present in 1 out of every 271 Amish children. In 2012, the Cochrane Library published a review of dozens of scientific studies involving about 14,700,000 children, which found no credible evidence of an involvement of MMR with either autism or Crohn's disease. The article was updated in 2020 and again in 2021, with the authors stating, "We have observed an improvement in the quality of the design and reporting of safety outcomes in MMR and MMRV in recent years both pre- and post-marketing."

A June 2014 meta-analysis involving more than 1.25 million children found "vaccinations are not associated with the development of autism or autism spectrum disorder. Furthermore, the components of the vaccines (thimerosal or mercury) or multiple vaccines (MMR) are not associated with the development of autism or autism spectrum disorder." In July 2014, a systematic review found "strong evidence that MMR vaccine is not associated with autism", and in March 2019, a large-scale study conducted by Statens Serum Institut following over 650,000 children for over 10 years found no link between the vaccine and autism, even among children with autistic siblings.

== Disease outbreaks ==
After the controversy began, the MMR vaccination compliance dropped sharply in the United Kingdom, from 92% in 1996 to 84% in 2002. In some parts of London, it was as low as 61% in 2003, far below the rate needed to avoid an epidemic of measles. By 2006 coverage for MMR in the UK at 24 months was 85%, lower than the about 94% coverage for other vaccines.

After vaccination rates dropped, the incidence of two of the three diseases increased greatly in the UK. In 1998 there were 56 confirmed cases of measles in the UK; in 2006 there were 449 in the first five months of the year, with the first death since 1992; cases occurred in inadequately vaccinated children. Mumps cases began rising in 1999 after years of very few cases, and by 2005 the United Kingdom was in a mumps epidemic with almost 5000 notifications in the first month of 2005 alone. The age group affected was too old to have received the routine MMR immunisations around the time the paper by Wakefield et al. was published, and too young to have contracted natural mumps as a child, and thus to achieve a herd immunity effect. With the decline in mumps that followed the introduction of the MMR vaccine, these individuals had not been exposed to the disease, but still had no immunity, either natural or vaccine induced. Therefore, as immunisation rates declined following the controversy and the disease re-emerged, they were susceptible to infection. Measles and mumps cases continued in 2006, at incidence rates 13 and 37 times greater than respective 1998 levels. Two children who underwent kidney transplantation in London were severely and permanently injured by measles encephalitis.

Disease outbreaks also caused casualties in nearby countries. Three deaths and 1,500 cases were reported in the Irish outbreak of 2000, which occurred as a direct result of decreased vaccination rates following the MMR scare.

In 2008, for the first time in 14 years, measles was declared endemic in the UK, meaning that the disease was sustained within the population; this was caused by the preceding decade's low MMR vaccination rates, which created a population of susceptible children who could spread the disease. MMR vaccination rates for English children were unchanged in 2007–08 from the year before, at too low a level to prevent serious measles outbreaks. In May 2008, a British 17-year-old with an underlying immunodeficiency died of measles. In 2008 Europe also faced a measles epidemic, including large outbreaks in Austria, Italy, and Switzerland.

Following the January 2011 BMJ statements about Wakefield's fraud, Paul Offit, a pediatrician at Children's Hospital of Philadelphia and a "long-time critic of the dangers of the anti-vaccine movement", said, "that paper killed children", and Michael Smith of the University of Louisville, an "infectious diseases expert who has studied the autism controversy's effect on immunization rates", said "clearly, the results of this (Wakefield) study have had repercussions." In 2014, Laurie Garrett, senior fellow at the Council on Foreign Relations, blamed "Wakefieldism" for an increase in the number of unvaccinated children in countries such as Australia and New Zealand, saying, "Our data suggests that where Wakefield's message has caught on, measles follows."

=== Impact on society ===
The New England Journal of Medicine said that antivaccinationist activities resulted in a high cost to society, "including damage to individual and community well-being from outbreaks of previously controlled diseases, withdrawal of vaccine manufacturers from the market, compromising of national security (in the case of anthrax and smallpox vaccines), and lost productivity".

Costs to society from declining vaccination rates (in US dollars) were estimated by AOL's DailyFinance in 2011:

- A 2002–2003 outbreak of measles in Italy, "which led to the hospitalizations of more than 5,000 people, had a combined estimated cost between 17.6 million euros and 22.0 million euros".
- A 2004 outbreak of measles from "an unvaccinated student return[ing] from India in 2004 to Iowa was $142,452".
- A 2006 outbreak of mumps in Chicago, "caused by poorly immunized employees, cost the institution $262,788, or $29,199 per mumps case".
- A 2007 outbreak of mumps in Nova Scotia cost $3,511 per case.
- A 2008 outbreak of measles in San Diego, California cost $177,000, or $10,376 per case.

In the United States, Jenny McCarthy blamed vaccinations for her son Evan's disorders and leveraged her celebrity status to warn parents of a link between vaccines and autism. Evan's disorder began with seizures and his improvement occurred after the seizures were treated, symptoms experts have noted are more consistent with Landau–Kleffner syndrome, often misdiagnosed as autism. After the Lancet article was discredited, McCarthy continued to defend Wakefield. An article in Salon.com called McCarthy "a menace" for her continued position that vaccines are dangerous.

Bill Gates has reacted strongly to Wakefield and the work of anti-vaccination groups:

Dr. [Andrew] Wakefield has been shown to have used absolutely fraudulent data. He had a financial interest in some lawsuits, he created a fake paper, the journal allowed it to run. All the other studies were done, showed no connection whatsoever again and again and again. So it's an absolute lie that has killed thousands of kids. Because the mothers who heard that lie, many of them didn't have their kids take either pertussis or measles vaccine, and their children are dead today. And so the people who go and engage in those anti-vaccine efforts—you know, they, they kill children. It's a very sad thing, because these vaccines are important.

The proportion of children in England receiving the vaccine by the age of two fell to 91.2% in 2017–18, from 91.6% the year before. Only 87.2% of five-year-olds had received both MMR vaccines.

With the onset of a large number of measles outbreaks in the United States in 2019, there is fear that parents who have not had their children vaccinated will help to spread infectious diseases in schools and universities where there are already other outbreaks.

== See also ==
- Autism rights movement
- Autism's False Prophets
- Controversies in autism
- Epidemiology of autism
- Measles resurgence in the United States
- Vaccine shedding
