= Pediatric gastroenterology =

Medical specialty

Pediatric gastroenterology developed as a sub-specialty of pediatrics and gastroenterology. It is concerned with treating the gastrointestinal tract, liver and pancreas of children from infancy until age eighteen. The principal diseases it is concerned with are acute diarrhea, persistent vomiting, gastritis, and problems with the development of the gastric tract.

== History ==
Pediatric gastroenterology has grown greatly in North America and Europe. It began with the speciality of pediatrics, which was developed along with children's hospitals in the 19th century. The concept of specialists concentrating on organ specific specialties started around the same time. A person who contributed to the development of the specialty was Dr. Samuel Gee in London with his focus on serious clinical conditions in children such as celiac disease and cyclic vomiting syndrome. The first national gastrointestinal society was created in Germany in 1920 by Ismar Isidor Boas. He was also the first physician devoted completely to only gastroenterology. Later the American Gastroenterological Association was founded in 1897 by Dr. D. Stewart. The combination to make a pediatric gastroenterological a specialty emerged in the 1960s, almost a century after the specialties of pediatrics and gastroenterology started out individually. All pediatric specialties started out with the concept that children with special needs were not receiving the adequate medical attention that they needed.

Margot Shiner, who in 1956 invented a biopsy tube that could be used to diagnose intestinal disease in children, particularly celiac disease, has been credited with initiating the emergence of pediatric gastroenterology as a distinct clinical specialty.

== Centers of pediatric gastroenterology ==
Centers for gastrointestinal disorders in children began being established in the 1960s in Great Britain, Australia, and continental Europe. The first centers for pediatric gastroenterology were established by Dolf Weijers and the biochemist Van de Kamer. Pediatricians and biochemists were crucial to the development of such specialty since they created the ability to calculate the fat in the feces of celiac patients with or without gluten. A clinical and research program in pediatric gastroenterology and a gastroenterological research were established in the 1960s at the Royal Children's Hospital in Melbourne by Charlotte Anderson. Later on an important center focused on nutrition and gut pathophysiology was established by Bertil Linquist in Lund, Sweden. This was the first place in which glucose-galactose malabsorption was reported. Pediatric gastroenterology centers in London contributed greatly to this field and hepatology by helping and recognizing multiple doctors with their investigations. An example is Tom Macdonald, who concentrated his immunological research on gastroenterological diseases in children and the use of a fetal intestinal organ culture model. Important pediatric gastroenterology centers were also established in Helsinki and Tampere, Finland. These centers, led by Jamro Visakorpi, primarily focused on celiac disease, gastroenteritis¸ and food allergies. Other important centers were established in Switzerland, under the leadership of Andrea Prader making Zürich one of the first main centers for pediatric gastroenterology. In that same center, David Shmerling started studying gluten elimination and celiac disease. Salvatore Auricchio along with Giorgio Semenza began comprehending and identifying sugar absorption disorders in children. Ettore Rossi in Bern founded centers in which Beat Hadorn and Michael Kentze, who later went on to establish German centers in Munich and Bonn, which made great contributions in the research of absorption pathophysiology. After working in Zurich, Salvatore Auricchio went on to establish an important center in Naples which focused research on celiac disease, the physiology of absorption, and oral re hydration therapy. In a center located in Brussels, led by E. Eggermont and Helmuth Loeb, Samy Cadranel started developing the concept of endoscopy in children.

== Centers of pediatric gastroenterology in North America ==
North America has also been a center for the development of pediatric gastroenterology. A pediatric gastroenterology program focusing on researching inflammatory bowel disease, infectious diarrhea, and motility disorders associated with gastrointestinal complications such as constipation and gastro esophageal reflux was established by Murray Davidson at the Albert Einstein Medical School and the Bronx-Lebanon Hospital Center in New York. Harry Shwachman created the center of excellence for pediatric gastroenterology in Boston in the early 1960s. This center, under the leadership of Richard Grand and Allan Walker, went on to become a major training program for pediatric gastroenterologists. In order to commemorate Dr. Shwaschman and his impact to the field, a Scwaschman Award is given annually since 1984 by the North American Society for Pediatric Gastroenterology and Nutrition to a person with important contributions to the field. In Canada, gastroenterology and hepatology surged independently from nutrition at the Hospital for Sick Children (HSC) in Toronto. Peter Durie combined the nutrition and gastroenterology research at the HSC in 1985.

Many more centers have been developed in multiple places including Sydney, Adelaide, Brisbane, Jerusalem, São Paulo, Santiago, Taipei, and Tokyo.

== Education ==
The specialty of pediatric gastroenterology requires four years of undergraduate courses at a college or university in order to obtain a BS, BA, or other bachelor's degree. During these four years a student studying pediatric gastroenterology can also take a pre-med course. Afterwards, the student needs four years of medical school in order to obtain an MD or DO degree and become a general doctor. Afterwards the student needs to take a specialty in pediatrics consisting in three more years of education called residency. Afterwards pediatrics sub-specialize in a more specific area such as pediatric gastroenterology. The time to sub-specialize is called post-residency training also known as a fellowship. It can take from one to three or more years consisting in a total of fourteen years or more. In the United States, the committees to certify pediatric gastroenterologist were created in the 1980s. This gave rise to sub-specialty boards in pediatric gastroenterology in 1990 under the leadership of American board of Pediatrics and its Pediatric Gastroenterology and Nutrition subspecialty sub-board, led by Bill Kish. A formal training program was created later in 1997 by the sub-specialty advisory committee for pediatric gastroenterology of the royal college of pediatrics and child health in Great Britain.

== Nutrition ==
The correct function of the gastric tract and the internal health is related to the nutrition that the child or its mother receives. From the prenatal period, correct nutrition can affect the developing of the system, short bowel syndrome (the most common one), necrotizing enterocolitis, gastroschisis or omphalocele to the postnatal period with diseases such as diarrhea.

One of the principal problems of a newborn is an iron deficiency, which will generate anemia. This is caused when the only food that the baby receives is maternal milk which does not fulfill the baby's nutrition. There is no treatment for this in this period because iron will reach normal levels with the weaning process. The weaning process consists in transitioning from feeding the baby low density food such as maternal milk to start feeding it more complex foods such as meat, fish, or chicken. (uniped) If the weaning process is not carried out correctly or if the child rejects the transition of food the iron deficiency will generate an anemia or even create allergies to certain food. In such cases gastric pediatricians, and not regular pediatricians, should be consulted to treat the anemia because they will now how to recover the correct iron levels without causing any secondary effects in the digestive system.

The most common nutrition problems during the childhood are being overweight or underweight, both caused by an imbalance in the number of calories consumed versus the number burned. Both in children should be treated by a gastric pediatrician and a pediatric nutritionist at the same time to help the child recover his normal weight without secondary effects (hypertension, gastritis, etc.). The nutritionist will regulate the eating habits of the child, however, the pediatric gastroenterologist will be the one checking how the change in food habits affects the correct functionality of the digestive system.

== Diseases ==
A pediatrician can provide treatment to many gastric diseases, but chronic diseases, related with the nutrition of the children, the pancreas or the liver needs to be treated by a specialist. The following are two of the most common ones. Acute diarrhea is one of the most common. Globally, each of the 140 million children born annually experience an average of 7-30 episodes of diarrhea in the first 5 years of life. Some of the causes are infections, lower levels of zinc or problems with some gastric cells.

Infant regurgitation is caused by a central nervous system reflex involving both autonomic and skeletal muscles in which gastric contents are forcefully expelled through the mouth because of coordinated movements of the small bowel, stomach, esophagus, and diaphragm. Diagnosis requires that the child be between 1 and 12, the regurgitation must be two or more times per day for three or more weeks, and there is a strong involuntary effort to vomit, hematemesis, aspiration, apnea, failure to thrive, or abnormal posturing. This is transient problem, possibly cause to the immaturity of gastrointestinal motility.
