= The Doctor Who Fooled the World =

2020 book by Brian Deer

The Doctor Who Fooled the World: Science, Deception, and the War on Vaccines
- North America edition cover
- Author: Brian Deer
- Language: English
- Genre: True crime
- Published: September 2020 (Johns Hopkins University Press, Baltimore)
- Publication place: United States
- Media type: Hardback and ebook
- Pages: 394
- Awards: Eric Hoffer Book Award; Gold Medal, Independent Publisher Book Awards
- ISBN: 9781421438009

The Doctor Who Fooled the World: Andrew Wakefield's War on Vaccines
- International Edition
- Author: Brian Deer
- Language: English
- Genre: True crime
- Published: September 2020 (Scribe Publications, London)
- Publication place: United Kingdom
- Media type: Paperback and ebook
- Pages: 394
- ISBN: 9781911617808

The Doctor Who Fooled the World: Science, Deception, and the War on Vaccines is a 2020 non-fiction book by Brian Deer. Written in narrative style, it sets out Deer's investigation of Andrew Wakefield and the Lancet MMR autism fraud.

Originally published by Johns Hopkins University Press, the book was simultaneously published in the United Kingdom and Australasia by Scribe with a different subtitle: "Andrew Wakefield's War on Vaccines".

== Synopsis ==
The text begins with an epigraph taken from Walter Scott's "Marmion": "O what a tangled web we weave, When first we practise to deceive."

A prologue follows, setting the as-if-fiction or new journalism style of Deer's writing, aimed at a general readership. It begins: "On the first night of the Donald Trump presidency, a video went up on the World Wide Web that sent a shudder through medicine and science. It featured a sixty-year-old man in a black tie and tuxedo grinning into his phone under blue and white lights from a ballroom in Washington, DC."

Deer tells his story in four parts: "Big Ideas", "Secret Schemes", "Exposed", and "Avenged", largely following the chronology of his investigation.

=== "Big Ideas" ===
The opening section covers Andrew Wakefield's early life, his medical training, including in Canada, and the beginning of Wakefield's various hypotheses. These included that Crohn's disease was caused by measles virus, and later that the MMR vaccine, which includes a live strain of measles, caused, first, Crohn's disease and, later he posited, autism.

The section culminates in Deer's account of a press conference at the Royal Free Hospital in London, given by its medical school, in February 1998 on the occasion of publication of a research paper by Wakefield and others in The Lancet claiming a link between MMR and autism. The section ends: "If the study's subjects and findings were as they appeared to be, then surely they were worth a few pages of The Lancet. If they were as they appeared."

=== "Secret Schemes" ===
The second section reveals Wakefield's undisclosed links to a firm of lawyers who, unbeknownst to the public, had hired Wakefield to make a case against MMR beginning two years before the press conference. Deer's reporting of this conflict of interest in The Sunday Times set off huge controversy, prompting a "partial retraction" by nearly all the authors of the paper's "interpretation" section, where a link between MMR and autism was proposed.

Deer continues the story into America, including further revelations about Wakefield's science, undisclosed business interests and association with an Irish pathologist, Professor John O'Leary, who, giving "independent" evidence to a committee of the United States Congress, claimed "Dr Wakefield's hypothesis is correct." Deer reports that O'Leary did not reveal to lawmakers that Wakefield, sitting next to him, was his business partner.

=== "Exposed" ===
This section covers the heart of Deer's investigation revealing what he characterises as wholesale fraud behind the 1998 Lancet paper, which set out case histories of 12 children, most of whom were said to have autism, with symptoms appearing shortly after they were given MMR. Deer reports how Wakefield changed case histories and pediatricians' diagnoses to make it appear that he had discovered a new medical syndrome. He also reveals that a critical element of this syndrome, "ileal-lymphoid-nodular hyperplasia", presented by Wakefield as if a discovery, was a commonplace observation in children.

Chapters in the third section cover a hearing of the longest-ever hearing by a disciplinary panel of the UK General Medical Council at which Wakefield was found guilty of dozens of counts of serious professional misconduct and was erased from the medical register. These included dishonest reporting in The Lancet and dishonestly misleading doctors who had raised questions about his methodology. Deer quotes Wakefield's own attorney who likened one charge to be of "fraud". He also quotes parents of children included in the Lancet paper, one of which said it was "not right and fraudulent", and another claimed it to be "outright fabrication".

=== "Avenged" ===
The final section follows Wakefield's reemergence in the United States as an anti-vaccine campaigner and filmmaker. At its heart is the story of an anti-vaccine documentary by Wakefield titled "Vaxxed", premised on allegations in the film that a researcher at the Centers for Disease Control and Prevention had accused the agency of fraud in a scientific paper on MMR. Representing this claim as retaliatory, Deer reveals that the researcher had not made the allegation and that a Wakefield associate had three times failed to elicit this claim in conversations with the CDC source.

In a closing epilogue, Deer evaluates Wakefield's character and motives, notes the now-former doctor's relationship with the Australian supermodel Elle Macpherson, and makes a comparison with a notorious British doctor and serial killer, Harold Shipman. Deer writes: "'He was so popular', noted a patient who didn't die at Shipman's hands. 'Everyone thought he was a marvelous doctor.'"

== Reception ==
The Times Book of the Week columnist David Aaronovitch wrote, "This is a remarkable story and this is a remarkable book… helping to explain the political and social predicament that now afflicts so many of us — the crisis in truth and its exploitation by people without scruple."

Reviewing for the leading science journal Nature, Saad Omer praised the book as "riveting… a compelling portrait of hubris and the terrible dark shadow it can cast."

Among other reviews, Michael Shermer in The Wall Street Journal wrote, "Exposing researchers who lie, cheat and fake their data often requires the work of courageous whistleblowers or tenacious investigative journalists. Enter Brian Deer, an award-winning reporter for The Sunday Times of London."

Reviewing for The British Journal of General Practice, Peter Lindsay wrote that "This book needs to be read widely".

The magazine Publishers Weekly wrote that the work in all is "a good debunking" that is "riveting" as well as having a text that is "logical, exciting, and enraging".

Big Think website said, "Every chapter drops your jaw".

According to Foreword Reviews, "This stunning work sounds an urgent message and demonstrates the essential role of investigative journalism in uncovering the truth."

=== Awards ===
The Doctor Who Fooled the World won the Eric Hoffer Award for nonfiction and a gold medal in the Independent Publisher Book Awards.

== See also ==
- Measles resurgence in the United States
- Vaccines and autism
- Vaccine hesitancy
- Vaccine misinformation
