= Brian Deer =

British investigative journalist

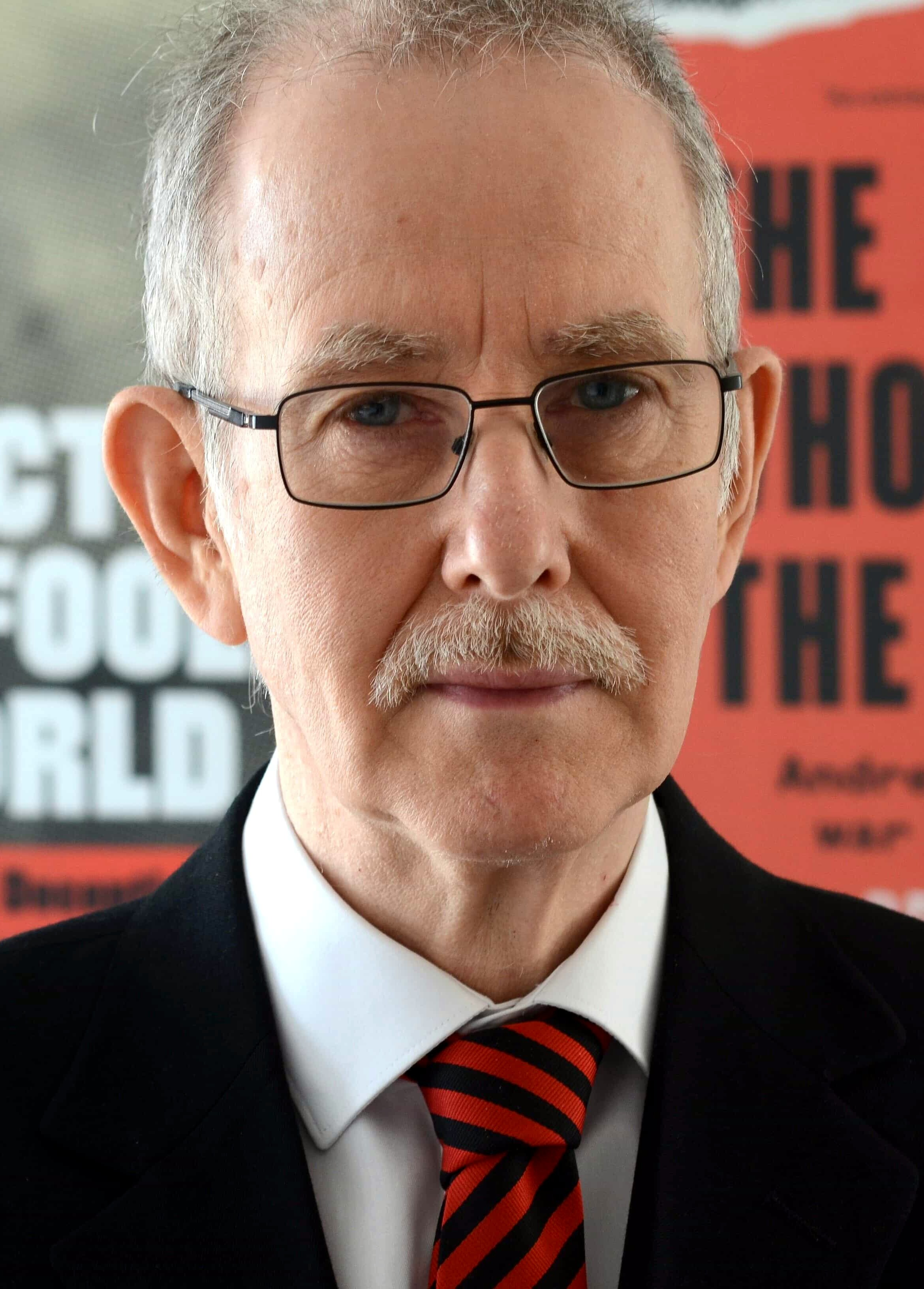
- Deer in 2025
- Education: University of Warwick
- Occupation: Investigative journalist
- Known for: Investigative reporting on medical issues and the pharmaceutical industry
- Website: briandeer.com

Brian Deer is a British investigative journalist, best known for inquiries into the drug industry, medicine, and social issues for The Sunday Times. Deer authored the investigative nonfiction book The Doctor Who Fooled the World in 2020, an exposé on anti-vaccine activist Andrew Wakefield and the 1998 Lancet MMR autism fraud.

== Career ==
After graduating in philosophy from the University of Warwick, he became editor and press officer for the Campaign for Nuclear Disarmament and was a member of The Leveller magazine collective. Subsequently, he joined The Times, then The Sunday Times, first as a business news subeditor and then as a staff news reporter and feature writer. In the 1980s, under then Sunday Times editor Andrew Neil, Deer was the UK's first social affairs correspondent.

Deer has also reported for other newspapers, including The Guardian, The Daily Telegraph, and The New York Times.

=== Investigations ===
In 1986, one of Deer's early investigations exposed research by British scientist Michael Briggs at Deakin University, Australia into the safety of the contraceptive pill. Deer's reports revealed that several of Briggs's studies were fabricated so as to give a positive profile for the products' cardiovascular safety. The research was largely financed by the German drug company Schering AG.

In 1994, his investigation of the Wellcome Trust led to the withdrawal in the UK of the antibiotic, Septrin (also sold under the name Bactrim) and the sale by the Wellcome Trust of its drug company subsidiary. In 2005, the withdrawal of the painkiller Vioxx was followed by an investigation by Deer into the people responsible for the drug's introduction.

In 2006, Deer's Dispatches documentary, "The drug trial that went wrong", investigated the experimental monoclonal antibody TGN1412. It was nominated for a Royal Television Society journalism award. In 2008, the media psychiatrist Raj Persaud was suspended from practicing medicine and resigned his academic position after being found guilty of plagiarism following an investigation by Deer.

== MMR vaccine controversy ==
In a series of reports between 2004 and 2010, for The Sunday Times, Deer investigated and helped debunk controversial claims linking the MMR vaccine to autism that had first emerged with the publication in 1998 of a fraudulent research paper in the medical journal The Lancet written by Andrew Wakefield, and his colleagues. Deer revealed that Wakefield had multiple undeclared conflicts of interest, had manipulated evidence, and was responsible for what The BMJ later called "an elaborate fraud".

Deer's investigation led to the longest-ever inquiry by the UK General Medical Council (GMC), lasting 217 days. In January 2010, the GMC judged Wakefield to be "dishonest", "unethical" and "callous", and on 24 May 2010, Wakefield was removed ("struck off") from the UK medical register. Responding to Deer's findings, The Lancet partially retracted Wakefield's research in February 2004, and fully retracted it in February 2010 following the GMC findings. In January 2011, Deer published his findings in the BMJ which in a signed editorial stated of the journalist, "It has taken the diligent scepticism of one man, standing outside medicine and science, to show that the paper was in fact an elaborate fraud."

On 18 November 2004, UK Channel 4's Dispatches series broadcast Deer's television documentary: "MMR: What they didn't tell you". Television critic Nancy Banks-Smith wrote in The Guardian: "After a year of rebuffs, Deer ran Dr Wakefield to ground at an Indianapolis conference on autism. The camera took a bit of a buffet and Dr Wakefield left with Deer following, shouting: 'We have very important questions to ask you about your research and your commercial ambitions, sir! Will you stand your ground and answer?' If this was hounding, and it was, Dr Wakefield had only himself to blame for running away". In response to the documentary, Wakefield initiated a libel suit against Deer. The case was later dropped and Wakefield became liable for the costs incurred by Deer and the other defendants.

In January 2012, Wakefield sued Deer and the BMJ, this time in Texas, but the case was thrown out in both district and appeals courts, with Wakefield again ordered to pay costs.

In October 2014, in an article published in The Sunday Times, Deer reported on a ruling from the Court of Protection, then recently made public but with the identities of the parties redacted. In the ruling, Justice Baker wrote, "The critical facts established in this case can be summarised as follows. M has autistic disorder. There is no evidence that his autism was caused by the MMR vaccination. His parents' account of an adverse reaction to that vaccination is fabricated."

In July 2015, Deer gave a lecture at The Amazing Meeting titled "Vaccines: The Vanishing Victims".

=== The Doctor Who Fooled the World ===
In September 2020 Johns Hopkins University Press published in North America Deer's investigation of Andrew Wakefield and the origins of the anti-vaccine movement in his book, The Doctor Who Fooled the World: Science, Deception, and the War on Vaccines. This was simultaneously published in the United Kingdom and Australasia by Scribe. Reviews included The Times Book of the Week where columnist David Aaronovitch wrote, "This is a remarkable story and this is a remarkable book… helping to explain the political and social predicament that now afflicts so many of us — the crisis in truth and its exploitation by people without scruple." Reviewing for the leading science journal Nature, Saad Omer praised the book as "riveting… a compelling portrait of hubris and the terrible dark shadow it can cast."

Among other reviews, Michael Shermer in The Wall Street Journal wrote, "Exposing researchers who lie, cheat and fake their data often requires the work of courageous whistleblowers or tenacious investigative journalists. Enter Brian Deer, an award-winning reporter for The Sunday Times of London." Publishers Weekly also described the book as "riveting", and the Big Think website said, "Every chapter drops your jaw". According to Foreword Reviews, "This stunning work sounds an urgent message and demonstrates the essential role of investigative journalism in uncovering the truth."

== Honours ==
Working for The Times and The Sunday Times, Deer received several awards, including two British Press Awards for his Sunday Times investigations. Following his first British Press Award in 1999, in February 2011 he was nominated for two more, in the categories of news reporter of the year and specialist journalist of the year, the latter of which he won on 5 April 2011.

In October 2011, Deer won the annual HealthWatch award, previously awarded to Sir Iain Chalmers, Professor David Colquhoun, and other prominent British medical campaigners. Deer was the 2009 Susan B. Meister lecturer in child health policy at the University of Michigan, and the 2012 Distinguished Lecturer in Life Sciences at the University of Wisconsin, La Crosse.

On 17 November 2016, Deer was awarded the honorary degree of Doctor of Letters (D Litt Hon) by York St John University.

In May 2021, Deer's book, The Doctor Who Fooled the World, won the Eric Hoffer Award for nonfiction, and a gold medal in the Independent Publisher Book Awards (IPPYs).
