= Journal of Pediatric Gastroenterology and Nutrition =

- Discipline: Pediatric gastroenterology
- Language: English
- Edited by: Giuseppe Indolfi, MD; Sandeep K. Gupta, MD

Publication details
- History: 1982–present
- Publisher: Lippincott Williams & Wilkins on behalf of the European Society for Paediatric Gastroenterology, Hepatology and Nutrition and the North American Society for Pediatric Gastroenterology, Hepatology and Nutrition
- Frequency: Monthly
- Open access: Hybrid
- Impact factor: 2.839 (2020)

Standard abbreviations
- ISO 4: J. Pediatr. Gastroenterol. Nutr.

Indexing
- CODEN: JPGND6
- ISSN: 0277-2116 (print); 1536-4801 (web)
- OCLC no.: 808763303

Links
- Journal homepage; Online access; Online archive

The Journal of Pediatric Gastroenterology and Nutrition is a monthly peer-reviewed medical journal covering research on digestive diseases and nutrition in children. It is published by Lippincott Williams & Wilkins and was established in 1982. It is an official journal of the European Society for Paediatric Gastroenterology, Hepatology and Nutrition and the North American Society for Pediatric Gastroenterology, Hepatology and Nutrition. The journal provides a forum for original papers and reviews dealing with pediatric gastroenterology and nutrition, including normal and abnormal functions of the alimentary tract and its associated organs, including the salivary glands, pancreas, gallbladder, and liver. Particular emphasis is on development and its relation to infant and childhood nutrition
