= Wahl Street =

American television series

- Genre: Reality television
- Created by: Mark Wahlberg; Stephen Levinson; Archie Gips
- Country of origin: United States
- Original language: English
- No. of seasons: 2
- No. of episodes: 16

Production
- Executive producers: Mark Wahlberg; Stephen Levinson; Archie Gips; Sarah Skibitzke; Liz Bronstein; James Wahlberg
- Production locations: Los Angeles, California; New York, New York; Las Vegas, Nevada
- Running time: 21–26 minutes
- Production company: Unrealistic Ideas

Original release
- Network: HBO Max
- Release: April 15, 2021 – October 6, 2022

Wahl Street is an American television series created by Mark Wahlberg, Stephen Levinson, and Archie Gips that premiered on HBO Max on April 15, 2021. It follows the actor Mark Wahlberg's businesses and investments as well as provides a glimpse into the characters who make up Wahlberg's real-life Entourage. The series was renewed for a second season in August 2021, which premiered in October 2022.

== Cast ==
=== Producers ===
- Mark Wahlberg, actor, producer, investor
- Stephen Levinson, Mark's long-time manager and producing partner
- Archie Gips, President of Unrealistic Ideas

=== Cast ===
- Harry Arnett, Co-Founder & CEO of Municipal
- Franklin D. Azar, Attorney and Investor in F45
- Cindy Cassel, Estate Manager for Wahlberg Family
- Tony Cervone, Producer, Director, and Writer at Warner Bros. Animation
- Jake Chasan, Investment Banker at Goldman Sachs
- Ryan Choi, Investor and Franchisee of F45
- Nino Cutaro, Investor and Franchisee of Wahlburgers
- Kimberly Dippel, Senior Designer at Municipal
- Tom Dowd, CEO of Performance Inspired Nutrition
- Lawrence Duram, Celebrity Chef and Personal Chef to Mark Wahlberg
- Jay Feldman, Partner in Mark Wahlberg Automotive Group
- Janice Bryant Howroyd, CEO of ActOne Group
- Daymond John, Shark Tank Shark, Investor and Television Personality
- James Lee Hernandez, Emmy-winning filmmaker and Editor of McMillions
- Emmanuel Lemelson, Greek Orthodox Priest and Hedge Fund Manager
- Liam McKiernan, Screenwriter, Director, Producer
- Mike Raymond, Investor and Board Member of F45
- Anthony 'Ace' Thomas, Mark's Friend and Member of the Funky Bunch
- Phil 'Rasta Phil' Thomas, Mark's friend and Reggae Master
- Paul Wahlberg, Chef and Co-founder of Wahlburgers
- Jeffrey M. Werner, Emmy-winning film editor
- Dana White, President of Ultimate Fighting Championship (UFC)

=== Advisers ===
- Michael Rubin, CEO of Fanatics
- Anne Wojcicki, Co-Founder & CEO of 23andMe
- Robert Earl, Founder of Earl Enterprises & Planet Hollywood International
- Byron Allen, Founder, Chairman & CEO of Allen Media Group
- Jeanie Buss, Governor & Co-Owner of Los Angeles Lakers
- Daniel Lubetzky, Founder of Kind Snacks
- Michele Ghee, CEO of Ebony Media Group
- Mark Cuban, Entrepreneur
- Tyler Perry, Founder & CEO of Tyler Perry Studios

== Ventures ==
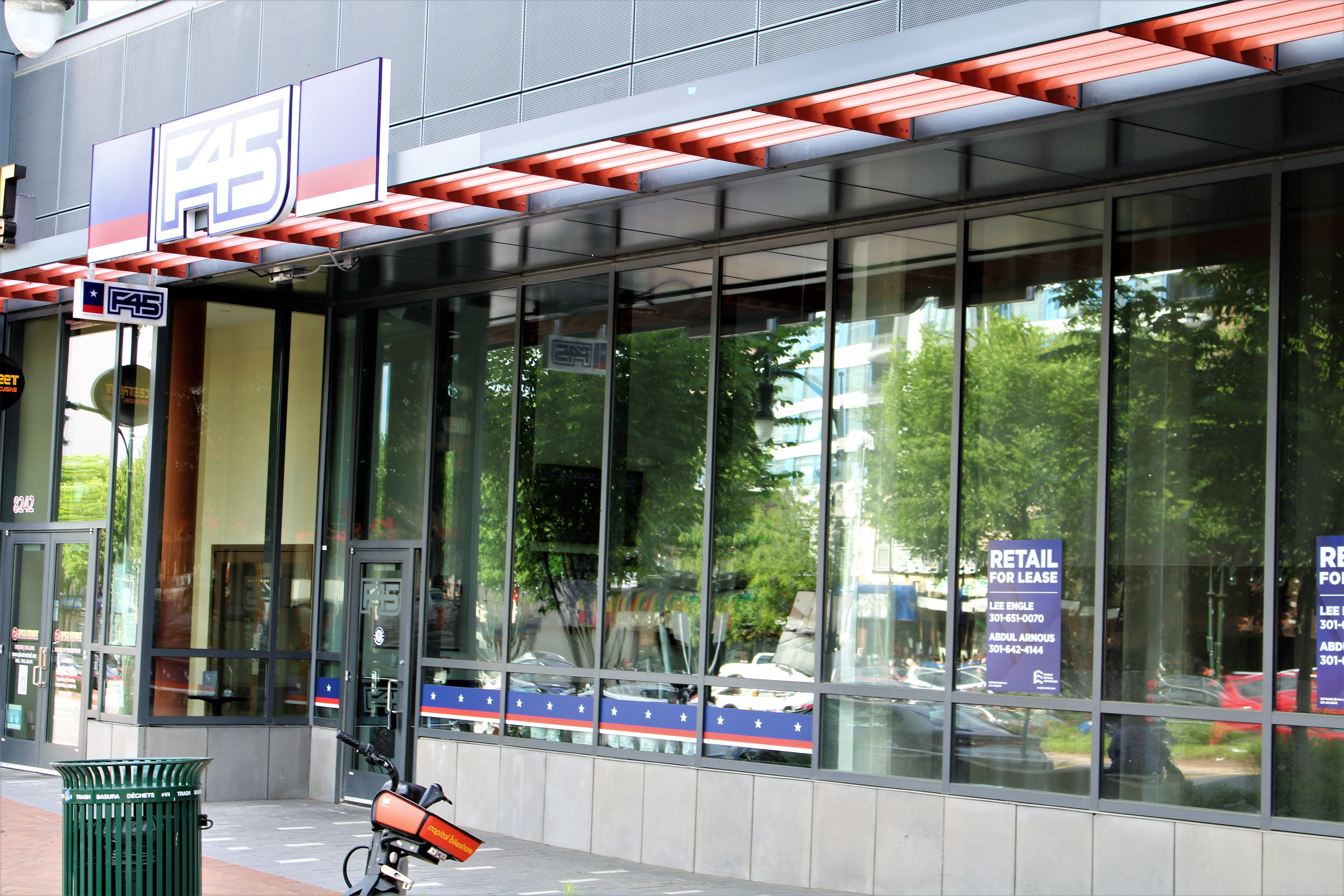
F45 Location

- F45, a chain of gyms providing workouts through its digitally-connected network of studios. The Initial Public Offering (IPO) of F45 is chronicled on the show, with Mark Wahlberg working with Goldman Sachs to take the company public and ringing the opening bell at the New York Stock Exchange (NYSE).
- Municipal, an athleisure clothing company.
- Mark Wahlberg Auto Group, a group of automotive dealerships
- Unrealistic Ideas, a production company for unscripted/nonfiction ideas, such as docuseries and podcasts
- Wahlburgers, a "family-owned" restaurant chain initially featured in television show Wahlburgers
- Closest To The Whole, a film and TV production company for scripted content
- AQUAhydrate, a water company
- Performance Inspired, a nutrition company

== Episodes ==
=== Season 1 ===
No.	Title	Original release date
1	"Start Up"	April 15, 2021
2	"ROI, Oh My"	April 15, 2021
3	"Cash Flow & Tell"	April 15, 2021
4	"Lock Down & Out"	April 15, 2021
5	"Capital Pains"	April 15, 2021
6	"Let's Do Launch"	April 15, 2021

=== Season 2 ===
No.	Title	Original release date
1	"Leap of Faith"	October 6, 2022
2	"Taking a Shot"	October 6, 2022
3	"IPO or No?"	October 6, 2022
4	"Alma Always"	October 6, 2022
5	"50 is the New 30"	October 6, 2022
6	"Wahlberg Meets Wall Street"	October 6, 2022
7	"Test Drives & Test Screenings"	October 6, 2022
8	"Mark on a Mission"	October 6, 2022
9	"Here's to Stu"	October 6, 2022
10	"The Move"	October 6, 2022

== Production ==
The series was greenlit by HBO on March 10, 2020 for its first season. According to The Wall Street Journal, Wahl Street was one of the "first business documentaries to emerge from the COVID-19 shutdown" and continued to keep the production going in the months of lockdown.

The series premiered on April 15, 2021. In August 2021, the series was renewed for a second season, which premiered in October 2022.

== Reception ==
The Chicago Sun Times called the series "entertaining" and Vox noted the show is a "...dive into what it’s like to be a celebrity who is also trying to have a hand in a bunch of businesses when a pandemic hits." The Wall Street Journal published that "[Wahl Street] is a survival story whose themes many business owners will recognize after the losses of the past year." In The Hollywood Reporter, HBO Max noted the series is an "intimate exploration behind the drive that makes Mark Wahlberg one of the most unique stars in entertainment." Boston.com mentioned that the show "makes reference to HBO's former hit series Entourage," the hit television series and movie that was produced by Wahlberg and inspired by his early career in the media industry while allowing viewers to meet the "characters that make up Marky Mark's real-life entourage."
