= Archie Gips =

American filmmaker and producer

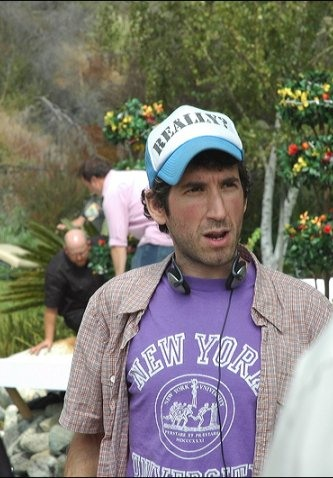
Gips in 2009

Archie Gips is an American filmmaker and producer.

== Early life ==
Gips' father was graphic designer Philip Gips, and his mother was copywriter Barbara Gips, who he has cited them as inspirations. Raised in New Rochelle, New York, he lives in Los Angeles.

Gips studied broadcast journalism at Syracuse University before moving to Chicago, where he was trained at The Second City and wrote several plays and sketch shows, including the comedy revue Saturday Morning Live. He received his masters in film from New York University's Tisch School of the Arts, where he won the top Graduate Screenwriting Student Award and New York Picture Company Award for Best Comedic Screenplay.

== Career ==
Gips' first feature-length film, Loveless in Los Angeles, is a romantic comedy that takes place behind the scenes of a reality dating show. The plot and characters were informed by his work as a writer/producer for Blind Date, EX-treme Dating and The 5th Wheel.

Gips wrote the animated feature, The Golden Blaze, featuring the voices of Blair Underwood and Neil Patrick Harris. The film took top honors at the 2005 Giffoni International Film Festival.

Gips co-directed and produced the documentary feature The Ambassadors of Hollywood, which examines the lives of the costumed characters who work on Hollywood Boulevard, and then wrote and directed Chloe and Keith's Wedding, the first independent feature ever marketed solely as a viral video. A clip from the film, which depicts a bride and a priest being knocked into a pool during a wedding ring exchange by the best man, has been viewed by more than 100 million people online. Titled Worst Best Man Ever, Clumsy Best Man Ruins Wedding, or Wedding Ring Exchange Fail, the movie clip became a viral sensation, making several top ten best lists including #80 on Time.com's best 99 viral videos of all time and featured on Yahoo's and AOL's home pages. The clip was also aired on hundreds of television talk shows and news broadcasts, most notably Today, The Ellen DeGeneres Show, Good Morning America, and Inside Edition and has been used in TV commercials throughout the world.

Gips also helped produce two features for Paramount Pictures. The Jon Chu feature film, Justin Bieber: Never Say Never and Katy Perry: Part of Me.

In television, Gips serves as executive producer and showrunner for Wahlburgers. In 2015, Gips was nominated for an Emmy Award for Outstanding Unstructured Reality Program. He also executive produced Welcome to Myrtle Manor, XOX Betsey Johnson, and Braxton Family Values. The first season of BFV was the #1 rated reality show on WE tv and the network ordered a 13-episode second season of the show after the third episode. Gips has directed, produced and written for ABC's Academy Awards Red Carpet show and was a consulting producer for Duck Dynasty.

Gips formed Unrealistic Ideas, a non-scripted production company with partners Mark Wahlberg and Stephen Levinson. Gips serves as president and has executive produced several projects through Unrealistic Ideas, including McMIllions, Run This City, The Murders at Starved Rock, and Wahl Street, appearing on camera in the lattermost. Gips was nominated for an Emmy Award for Outstanding Documentary Or Nonfiction Series, for McMillions, a Critic's Choice Real TV Award for Best Business Show for Wahl Street, an IDA Documentary Award for Best Short Form Series for Run This City and a News and Documentary Emmy Award for Outstanding Crime and Justice Documentary for Murders at Starved Rock.

== Filmography ==
=== Director ===
- Chloe & Keith's Wedding
- The Ambassadors of Hollywood
- 83rd & 84th Annual Academy Awards Red Carpet Show (segments)
- Loveless in Los Angeles

=== Writer ===
- Chloe & Keith's Wedding
- Loveless in Los Angeles
- The Golden Blaze
- The 5th Wheel
- Blind Date

=== Producer ===
- Katy Perry: Part of Me
- Justin Bieber: Never Say Never
- Wahlburgers
- Welcome to Myrtle Manor
- Duck Dynasty
- XOX Betsey Johnson
- Tamar & Vince
- Braxton Family Values
- Top Chef
- Loveless in Los Angeles
- Last Comic Standing
- McMillions
- Wahl Street
- MoviePass, MovieCrash
