= Barbara Gips =

American copywriter (1936–2025)

- Born: Barbara Joan Solinger; July 10, 1936 the Bronx, New York City, US
- Died: October 16, 2025 (aged 89) the Bronx, New York City, US
- Occupation: Copywriter
- Spouse: Philip Gips (m. 1958)
- Children: 5, indlucing Archie

Barbara Joan Gips (née Solinger; July 10, 1936 – October 16, 2025) was an American copywriter, known for her film taglines, which includes Alien.

== Biography ==
Gips was born on July 10, 1936, in the Bronx, and grew up in Riverdale. Her father was Louis Solinger, a mattress ticker, and her mother was Ray Leah Solinger (née Frank), an eldercare volunteer. During her childhood, she wrote plays, which were acted by other children. The tickets from her plays were donated to charity. She attended Yonkers High School and later graduated from Boston University in 1957, with a Bachelor of Fine Arts, then from Columbia University in 1958, with a Master of Arts. In 1958, she married graphic designer Philip Gips, having five children, including Archie Gips. After birthing her children, she returned to playwrighting, which were now performed in local schools.

Gips wrote the tagline for Alien: "in space no one can hear you scream". She had viewed a prescreening of the film with her husband, who had designed the poster. Where she was when she came up with the line is disputed. Gips herself claimed it came to her while on Riverside Drive one evening, though other stories claim while she was on the Cross Bronx Expressway, or while washing dishes. Her first tagline, she was paid approximately $500 for it. She later received awards from the Art Directors Club of New York and Communication Arts. In 2024, writing for Backstage, Gregory Lawrence said the tagline "feels like a personal attack on the reader".

Gips went on to write taglines for approximately 24 films, including:

- The Competition: "the one thing that brought them together is the one thing that's tearing them apart"
- Desperately Seeking Susan: "it's a life so outrageous it takes two women to live it"
- Fatal Attraction: "on the other side of drinks, dinner and a one-night stand, lies a terrifying love story"
- Kramer vs. Kramer: "Ted Kramer is about to learn what 10 million women already know"
- No Way Out: "is it a crime of passion, or an act of treason?"
- Postcards From the Edge: "Having a wonderful time, wish I were here"
- Silkwood: "sometimes the most unlikely person turns out to be a hero"

Gips also wrote for local magazines. She made cameos in the films Chloe & Keith's Wedding and Loveless in Los Angeles, as a grandmother and a tourist, respectively; both films were directed by her son Archie. She died on October 16, 2025, aged 89, in the Bronx, from a stroke.
