= Philip Gips =

American graphic designer (1931–2019)

- Born: Philip Sheldon Gips; March 28, 1931 the Bronx, New York City, US
- Died: October 3, 2019 (aged 88); White Plains, New York, US
- Burial place: Kensico Cemetery
- Education: Cooper Union; Yale School of Art
- Occupation: Graphic designer
- Spouse: Barbara Gips (m. 1958)
- Children: 5, including Archie

Philip Sheldon Gips (March 28, 1931 – October 3, 2019) was an American graphic designer, known for his film posters.

== Biography ==
Gips was born on March 28, 1931, in the Bronx, to Murray Gips and Rose Gips (née Nevins). He drew throughout his childhood. He graduated from the Cooper Union, in addition to the Yale School of Art. In 1958, he married copywriter Barbara Gips.

While attending Yale, Gips served as art director of Monocle, a magazine, alongside Lou Klein. For two years, he also served as art director for Time Life. He and Klein worked with Monocle until the early 1960s, with them founding an advertising firm. In 1968, he cofounded Gips Balkind – later Frankfurt Gips Balkind, when Stephen Frankfurt joined in 1988. Frankfurt was previously an executive of Young & Rubicam, and during that time, had requested Gips create film posters. Throughout his career, the film posters he created include:

- Rosemary's Baby (1968)
- Catch-22 (1970)
- Emmanuelle (1974)
- That's Entertainment (1974)
- Tommy (1975)
- The Front (1976)
- Network (1976)
- Superman (1978)
- Alien (1979)
- All That Jazz (1979)
- Kramer vs. Kramer (1979)
- Absence of Malice (1981)
- Arthur (1981)
- The Verdict (1982)
- Desperately Seeking Susan (1985)
- Hoosiers (1986)
- Fatal Attraction (1987)
- No Way Out (1987)
- Casualties of War (1989)

Alien, Downhill Racer, and Rosemary's Baby were voted to Premiere's 50 Best Movie Posters of All Time list in 2001. The poster for Emmanuelle is hung in the Museum of Modern Art, as well as his 1973 lithograph Imported From Sweden. Imported From Sweden; another work, the poster Tumba, had also been displayed in 1983.

Gips sometimes collaborated with his wife Barbara, who wrote taglines. He also created the logos for 38 Special, A&E, ESPN, and History Channel. He retired in 2007. He had five children, including filmmaker Archie Gips. He and his family cameoed in Archie's films Loveless in Los Angeles (2007) and Chloe & Keith's Wedding (2009). He died on October 3, 2019, aged 88, in White Plains, New York, from chronic obstructive pulmonary disease and pneumonia. He was buried at Kensico Cemetery, in Valhalla, New York.
