= XOX Betsey Johnson =

- Lulu Johnson (left) and Betsey Johnson
- Genre: Reality
- Starring: Betsey Johnson; Lulu Johnson
- Country of origin: United States
- Original language: English
- No. of seasons: 1
- No. of episodes: 8

Production
- Executive producers: Archie Gips; Dan Cutforth; Jane Lipsitz; Sarah Weidman; Sitarah Pendelton-Eaglin
- Producers: Jerri Howell; Pete Shanel
- Cinematography: Michael Millikan
- Running time: 40 to 42 minutes
- Production company: Magical Elves Productions

Original release
- Network: Style Network
- Release: May 12 – July 18, 2013

XOX Betsey Johnson is an American reality television series on the Style Network and debuted on May 12, 2013. The series follows Betsey Johnson and her daughter, Lulu, as they struggle to evolve their mother-daughter relationship, move on from filing Chapter 11 bankruptcy and nurture their future careers.

== Cast ==
=== Main ===
- Betsey Johnson
- Lulu Johnson
- Brandon Aldridge

=== Recurring ===
- Brandon Aldridge — Betsey's design director and CEO of menswear line Highland Duds
- Ashley — Lulu's assistant
- Angela — Lulu's best friend
- Bogdan — Betsey's trainer
- Janet — Betsey and LuLu's therapist

== Episodes ==
| No. | Title | Original release date |
|---|---|---|
| 1 | "Welcome to Betseyville" | May 12, 2013 |
In the series premiere, Betsey strategies with Steve Madden's team on how to re-launch her brand and image after bankruptcy. Lulu begins to designing her own line. Betsey celebrates her new collaboration with Steve Madden by hosting a party to honor her best designs.
| 2 | "Rebrand Spankin' New" | May 19, 2013 |
Betsey prepares for her upcoming fashion show that will assist in the reestablishment of her brand. With all the work adding up, Betsey asks her former design assistant Brandon to come back and work for her. Lulu is excited to start her new business venture but is confronted by Betsey after she receives an expensive credit card bill. The duo attend family therapy.
| 3 | "Right Hand for the Job" | May 26, 2013 |
Betsey and Lulu must drive down to their Hamptons home to retrieve a vintage archival pieces that Betsey needs for her fashion show. Later, Betsey begins to talk with a previous love interest that she has to hide due to Lulu disapproving him.
| 4 | "NY Stakes & LA Quakes!" | June 13, 2013 |
Betsey is busy selecting thirty models for a fashion show located on the East Coast while also flying to the West Coast for an appearance.
| 5 | "Walk Down Vintage Lane" | June 20, 2013 |
Lulu starts to question Allison's contributions to her business while Betsey continues working on her upcoming show.
| 6 | "Biggest Show of My Life" | June 27, 2013 |
Cyndi Lauper performs at Betsey's show while Lulu's business has a difficult time achieving success.
| 7 | "5 O'Clock Somewhere" | July 11, 2013 |
With the rebranding of her image, Betsey collaborates with editors to create and launch her new website. Lulu and Betsey later get their routine mammograms, with one of the tests having abnormal results.
| 8 | "Betsey Takes Tokyo" | July 18, 2013 |
In order to get away from the stress, the duo fly to Tokyo. Betsey is able to discover and learn more about Harajuku fashion. Lulu reveals some hidden feelings to her mom.
