= The 5th Wheel =

American dating reality television series

- Genre: Reality; Dating
- Directed by: Keirda Bahruth; Joe Dea
- Presented by: Aisha Tyler (2001–2002); Tom Gottlieb (2002–2004)
- Country of origin: United States
- Original language: English
- No. of seasons: 1
- No. of episodes: 10

Production
- Executive producers: Jay Renfroe; David Garfinkle; Thomas Klein; Harley Tat
- Producers: James DuBose; Archie Gips
- Camera setup: Multi-camera
- Running time: 22–24 minutes
- Production company: Bobwell Productions (Renegade division)

Original release
- Network: Syndication
- Release: September 17, 2001 – May 21, 2004

The 5th Wheel is an American dating reality television series that aired in syndication from September 17, 2001, to May 21, 2004. The show was initially hosted by comedian Aisha Tyler, but when Tyler left after completing the first season, the remaining two seasons were hosted in narration by announcer Tom Gottlieb.

The series' closing slogan was, "...where strangers become friends, friends become lovers, and lovers become bitter, suicidal exes all on the same show." However, when Gottlieb took over the show, the catchphrase was altered accordingly to say "...where strangers become lovers and lovers become bitter suicidal exes all in the same show."

== Synopsis ==
The show would begin with two men and two women, who were sent out on two B/G dates where each couple would spend time with each other and then switch to spend time with the other man/woman (the show never did any episodes with entirely same-sex contestants, though a few episodes did show two men or two women abandoning their hetero original date and hooking up with each other). Then a 5th man or woman (hence, "the fifth wheel") would join the group, usually as a more outgoing/sensual counterpoint to the initial 4 contestants. After a mix of dates involving the initial players and the 5th wheel, every contestant would write down the name of the person they'd like to go out with again, and everyone would reveal their selections at the end of the show to see who won and who lost; the "ideal" result for the show would involve two couples picking each other and one poor person being left out, though in one case a man and woman chose each other and the other man and TWO women (including the 5th wheel) all chose each other; this episode involved the FFM pair taking off each other's clothes during the 5th wheel date (this was edited so it was not shown explicitly in the TV broadcast) in the private room that the show made available for hookups if wanted. Picking nobody was an option for all contestants, though it was seldom used and never applied to undesirable women but to unwanted groups of men. The cameras would follow their every move, while commentary in the form of subtitles, animations, and "thought bubbles" (similar to the style used in Pop-Up Video) was added by the show's producers. The show was cancelled in 2004.

== Production notes ==
The series was produced by Renegade Productions, a subdivision of Bobwell Productions/Gold Coast Entertainment—the same company that produced Blind Date (which would often air before The 5th Wheel) -- but was more provocative and sexual in nature than its sister series, offering crazier and more elaborate subtitles and superimposed animated jokes which altered the appearance of the scene featuring each couple.

=== Crew ===
The 5th Wheel's credits listed veteran comedy writers Rob Dames, Vance DeGeneres, Martin Olson and Archie Gips.

== Syndication ==
Reruns were eventually aired on Fox Reality, but later was removed from its lineup. An "uncensored" version of the series without pixelated nudity or profanity censored was made available via pay-per-view and video on demand under the Too Much for TV branding of American PPV provider In Demand, and remains a part of the service's rotation several years after the show's departure from broadcast television.
