= The Golden Blaze =

- Directed by: Bryon E. Carson
- Written by: Archie Gips
- Starring: Blair Underwood; Michael Clarke Duncan
- Music by: Joseph Stanley Williams
- Production company: Urban Entertainment
- Distributed by: Kidtoon Films
- Release date: April 29, 2005
- Running time: 94 minutes
- Country: United States
- Language: English

The Golden Blaze is a 2005 American animated superhero film written by Archie Gips and directed by Bryon E. Carson. The feature, starring the voices of Blair Underwood and Michael Clarke Duncan, had a limited theatrical run making it the second flash animation ever to be theatrically released, after Mexico's Magos y Gigantes in 2003, and the first in the United States. The film is animated and stylized like a comic book. It also took top honors at the prestigious 2005 Giffoni International Film Festival.

The film had a limited theatrical release on April 29, 2005, and released to DVD on May 10, 2005.

== Plot ==
This feature-length animated movie follows the troubles of two school kids. Fierce rivals, the two regularly butt heads over all manner of issues, ranging from the trivial to the important. The film enters the fantasy realm as an accident occurs and the two boy's fathers suddenly possess some lethal superpowers, allowing them to enter into battle at the behest of their offspring.

== Cast ==
- Blair Underwood as Gregory Fletcher/Golden Blaze
- Khleo Thomas as Jason Fletcher/Sure Shot
- Michael Clarke Duncan as Thomas Tatum/Quake
- Ricky D'Shon Collins as Leon Tatum
- Neil Patrick Harris as Comic Shop Owner
- Sanaa Lathan as Monica
