= F45 Training =

Australian-based fitness studio franchise

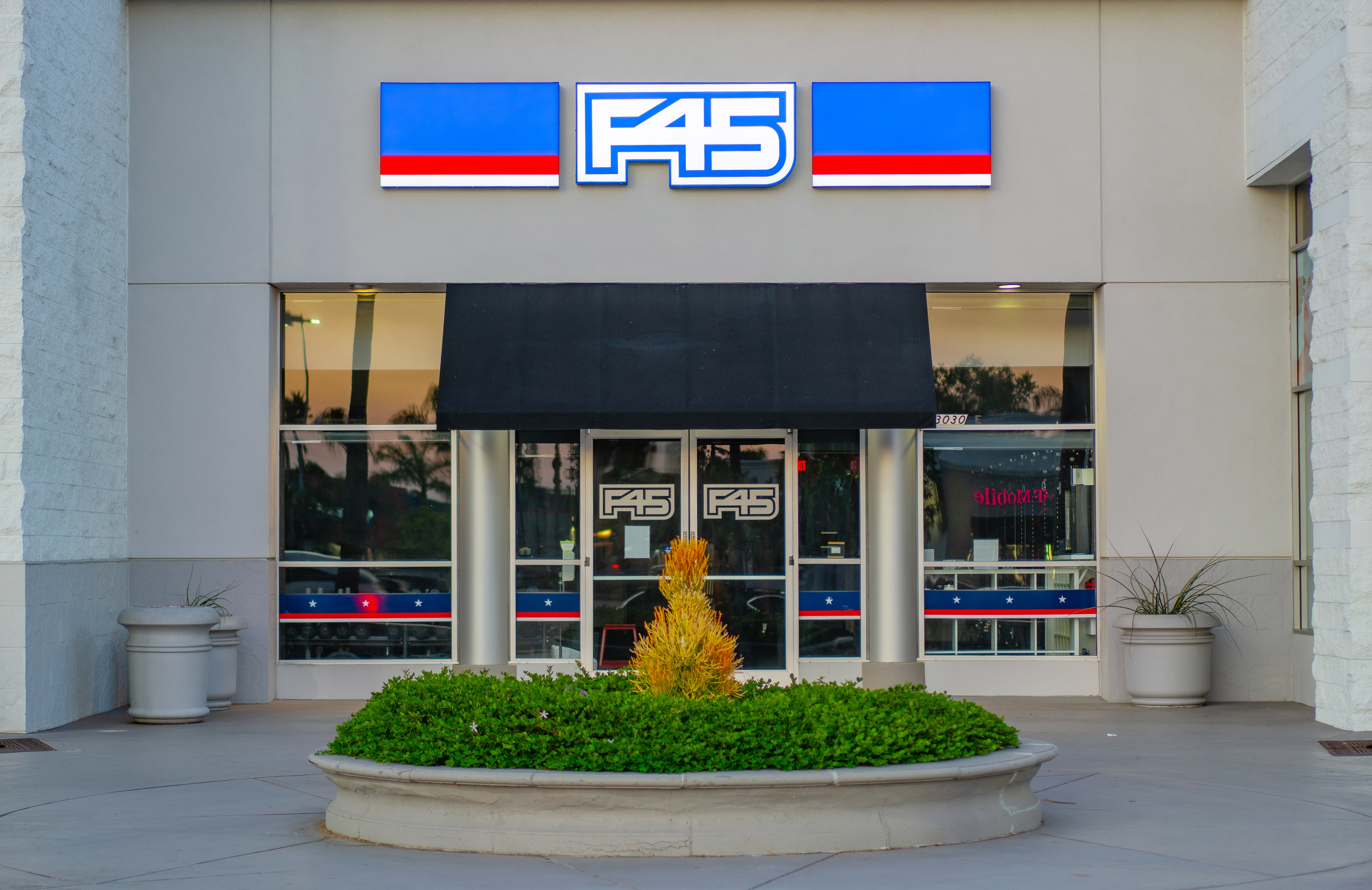
- F45 Training in Costa Mesa, California
- Industry: Health club, fitness, gym
- Founded: Epping, Australia (2011)
- Founders: Adam Gilchrist; Rob Deutsch
- Headquarters: Austin, Texas
- Number of locations: 60 countries 235 (Australia); 68 (New Zealand); 806 (United States); 23 (Europe); 13 (South Africa); 155 (Canada); 39 (Middle East); 58 (United Kingdom); 136 (Asia)
- Key people: Tom Dowd; Mark Wahlberg
- Website: f45training.com

F45 Training is an Australian franchiser and operator of fitness centers based in Austin, Texas. It has around 1,600 studios in over 60 countries across Australia/Oceania, North America, South America, Asia, Europe, and Africa. The first gym was founded by Luke Istomin and Rob Deutsch, and the fitness franchise was launched in 2013 with Adam Gilchrist. It was ranked the fastest growing fitness franchise in the US in 2021, one of the fastest globally. It has around 1,600 studios worldwide, including approximately 240 studios in Australia and about 1,000 studios in North America as of 2024.

== History ==
In 2012, the first F45 studio was launched in Paddington, Sydney. Here Luke Istomin and Rob Deutsch worked on the fitness model within the studio. After the success of its first studio, Deutsch enlisted the help of franchisee expert, Adam Gilchrist, who quickly became their business partner when they decided to franchise the F45 business. In 2013, F45 sold their first franchise, and in 2014 they began a franchise roll-out in Sydney with 15 franchises bought by members of the original F45 studio in Paddington.

=== Offshore expansion ===
In 2015, F45 sold their first offshore franchise in New Zealand. This marked a two-year milestone of 250 franchises in the Oceania region. In 2015, F45 sold their first studio in the United States, sparking a rapid US expansion. That same year, F45 launched in India with the help of Australian cricketer Brett Lee and Indian cricketer VVS Laxman, and the first store opened in Hyderabad, with more studios opening in major Indian cities, such as Bangalore, Chennai, Raipur and Gurgaon. Luke Istomin left in 2016 to set up his own fitness franchise, Reunion Training.

In 2017, Gilchrist and Deutsch entered the United Kingdom with 50 franchises sold—35 of which opened in London, and 15 across Brighton, Bournemouth, Birmingham, and Manchester.

Between 2017 and 2018, F45 launched the beginning of its European growth strategy, opening studios in Finland, Switzerland, Czech Republic, and Germany. F45 simultaneously increased its US presence through its Collegiate Program, which entailed a partnership between F45 and U.S. colleges to permeate the young influential group of individuals.

In the first half of 2019, the fitness franchise secured a deal to open studios in Afghanistan and Iraq, as well as in Kenya and Mauritius in Africa, taking their presence to over 40 countries. In 2019, Mark Wahlberg Investment Group and FOD Capital announced that they were buying a minority stake in the F45 business, the deal valued the company at US$450 million (AU$672 million). In 2020, Rob Deutsch left the company.

In 2021, F45 launched FS8, offshoot gyms offering Pilates-yoga hybrid, circuit-based training sessions. In 2022, it acquired Vive Active, a Pilates studio, which then became Vaura Pilates.

F45 Training went public in July 2021 with the company valued at US$1.4 billion (AU$2.1 billion). F45, however, since experienced a number of problems, with gym closures, falling stock prices, employees layoffs as part of its restructuring, and threats of lawsuits from investors. It later revealed that it lost $193.5M in 2021 and $178.8M in 2022, making a total of $372M loss over the two years. Gilchrist stood down as CEO in July 2022, and later replaced by Tom Dowd as CEO, while Mark Wahlberg was named as chief brand officer.

On August 15, 2023, F45 Training Holdings announced it had delisted from the NYSE after its share price fell by 75% and warnings were issued over its noncompliance on listing standards. In 2024, David Beckham sued F45 for breach of contract, alleging he was not paid for his role as a global brand ambassador. The case settled out of court.

== Workouts ==
The name F45 refers to the 45-minute "functional" exercises offered in F45 gyms. The workouts in F45 gyms are a form of high-intensity interval training (HIIT) combined with circuit training and functional training. All F45 workouts are given a name, and each consists of different exercises that are variations on the HIIT format, where the participants usually move through a series of stations with different exercise equipment in every workout. On some days the workouts may be focused on cardio exercises, on others they may be focused on strength and resistance.

A number of basic pieces of functional equipment are used within a relatively small space, and the equipment used varies from day to day depending on what type of session it is. Common equipment includes: mat, resistance band, utility bench, BOSU balance trainer, exercise ball, kettlebell, dumbbell, medicine ball, sandbag, battle ropes, weights, barbell, exercise bike, indoor rower, sled, and pull-up bars.

== See also ==
- CrossFit
- Orangetheory Fitness
- Barry's (company)
- Hyrox
