= Battling ropes =

Ropes used for exercise

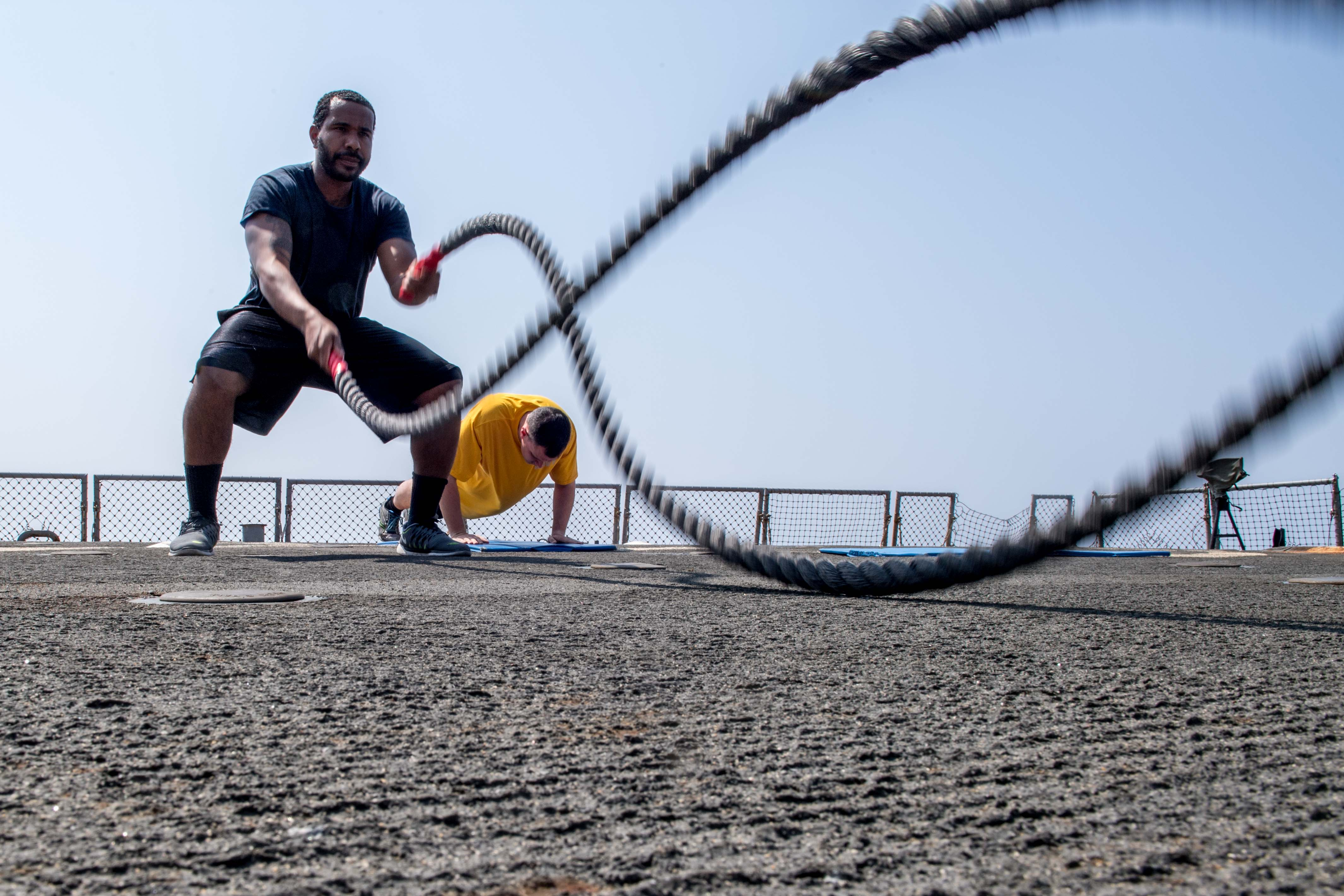
Battling ropes

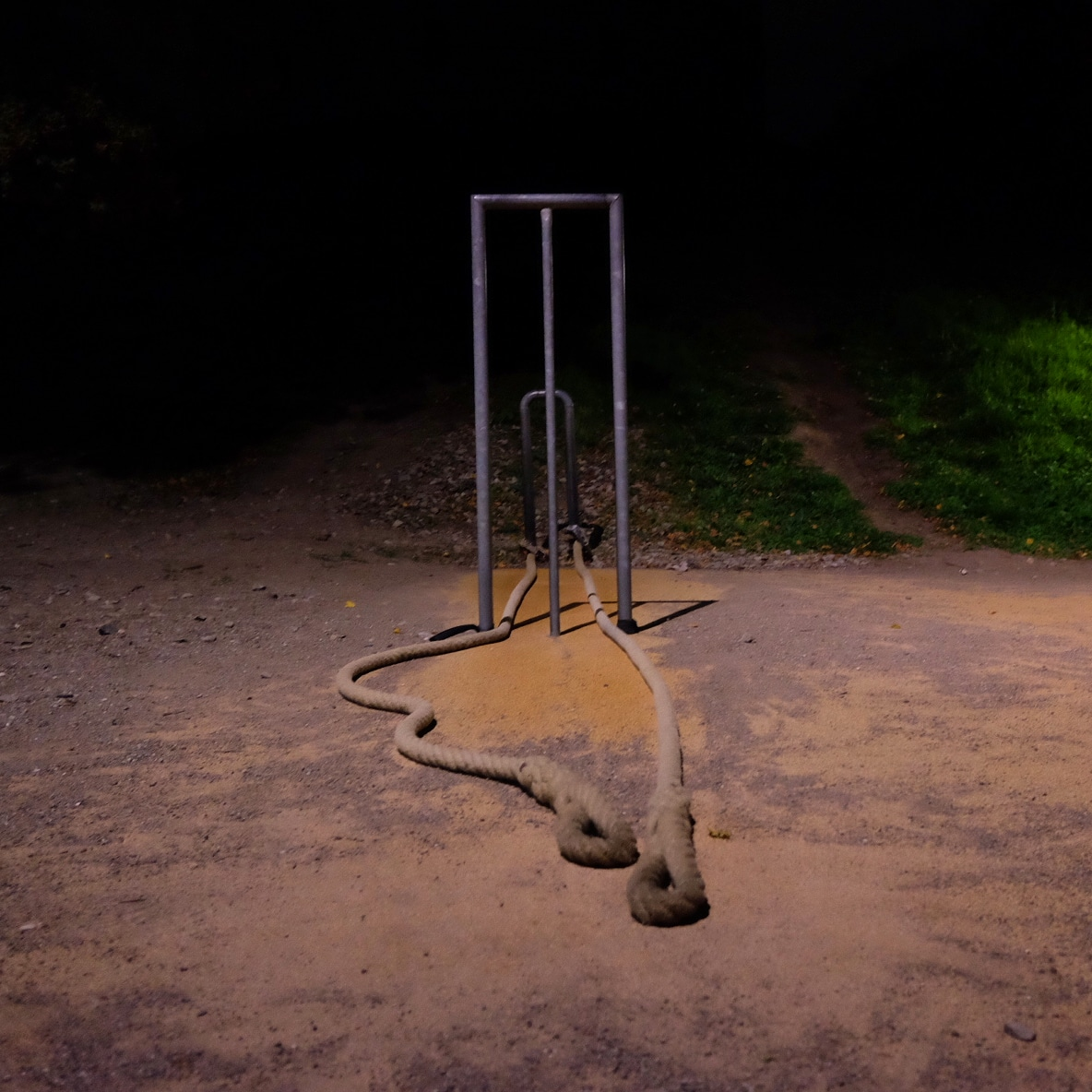
Battling ropes at an outdoor gym in Sweden

Battling ropes (also known as battle ropes or heavy ropes) are used for fitness training to increase full body strength and conditioning. They were designed by John Brookfield in 2006, who developed the system around his backyard. The battling rope can be alternatively used as a resistance training technique. After its development, Brookfield taught the system to Special Forces, the Cincinnati Bengals, and the Olympic wrestling team. Since then, the training system has expanded to mainstream gyms.

With one battle rope per upper extremity, battling ropes work out each arm independently, overcoming strength imbalances. They also reduce orthopedic load on joints -- they are low impact. Battling ropes are thick, heavy and strong in order to give significant resistance, and there are numerous types of rope used. The ropes typically have two common diameters (25 mm and 44 mm) and common standard lengths (5 m, 10 m, and 25 m). Some battle ropes now have a flexible metal core, making them heavier, shorter and allowing the user to move during training without being restricted by an anchor point.

== Exercises ==
There are three common exercises that one can perform with battle ropes: the wave, slams, and pulls. The wave, as the name suggests, has the user make continuous waves with the ropes. Slams are similar to the wave, except the rope is slammed each time. Pulls involve the user pulling the rope towards oneself, either simultaneously or alternatively. There are a multitude of other exercises that work various muscles of the body. For instance, moving the ropes side to side will work out the hips and core to improve total body stability, whereas moving the ropes in circles will increase shoulder range of motion. A tire can be added to the end to increase resistance when pulling.

=== Types of battle rope waves ===
- Vertical waves with a single rope: The trainee holds one end of the battle rope with two hands and stands with the feet shoulder-width apart, keeping the back straight and core engaged and driving the wave all the way to the end. The arms are moved up and down to generate force (waves) moving down the rope.
- Alternating waves: The trainee performs this movement by alternating arms, with one end of the rope in each hand. The basic premise of alternating waves is one arm generates the wave, then the other arm and back. Within alternating waves can include standing, kneeling, pulling the rope up to down or down to up, one can also add rotation into the movement as well. Alternating waves can be performed by standing with the feet a bit more than shoulder-width apart, keeping the core engaged as well as the back and neck straight. There should not be too much tension in the rope, causing the user to lean over.
