= Welcome to Myrtle Manor =

American reality television series

Coordinates: 33°41′28″N 78°55′02″W

- Also known as: Trailer Park: Welcome To Myrtle Manor
- Genre: Reality
- Country of origin: United States
- Original language: English
- No. of seasons: 3
- No. of episodes: 30

Production
- Running time: 40 to 43 minutes
- Production companies: The Weinstein Company; Jupiter Entertainment

Original release
- Network: TLC
- Release: March 3, 2013 – April 23, 2015

Welcome to Myrtle Manor, also known as Trailer Park: Welcome To Myrtle Manor, is an American reality television series on TLC that premiered on March 3, 2013, with filming of the first season taking place from August to November 2012. TLC ordered a second season in May 2013 that consists of ten episodes and debuted on January 16, 2014. Filming for the second season began the last week of June 2013 and completed in October 2013. The series' production company, The Weinstein Company, announced that the series would be renamed Trailer Park: Welcome To Myrtle Manor beginning with the second season in order to leave the option open for spin-off series set in other trailer parks across the United States.

It was announced on July 10, 2014, that Welcome to Myrtle Manor had been renewed for a third season that consists of 10 episodes. Filming began on August 11, 2014, and continued through January 2015.

On June 4, 2015, the cast announced that TLC would not be going forward with a fourth season. The cast asked for fans of the show to let TLC know that they wanted a fourth season. As of 2016, TLC had "no plans" for another season. Cecil Patrick, owner of the mobile home park, said it was still a tourist attraction, especially among those whose lives were similar to the park's residents.

== Premise ==
Welcome to Myrtle Manor documents the lives and problems of the residents at Myrtle Manor — also named Patrick's Mobile Home Park — a trailer park community located in Myrtle Beach, South Carolina. The series includes drinking, relationship drama and the struggle as Cecil hands over the park to his youngest daughter, Becky. Some of the cast members have lived in the park for years, others had just arrived.

== Cast ==
- Cecil Patrick—Cecil is Becky's father and the owner of the trailer park. His father built Myrtle Manor.
- Becky Robertson—Becky is manager of Myrtle Manor Mobile Home Park and the daughter of Cecil. The trailer park has been within Becky's family for years, and now her father has passed management of it onto her.
- Jeana Futrell—"Miss Jeana" is Becky's aunt and Cecil's sister. After a 20-year marriage, she moved to the park once her divorce was settled.
- Chelsey Keller— Chelsey and Lindsay are shown running a start-up hot-dog business named Darlin' Dog in the first season. In the second season, the hot-dog business is no more and Chelsey now works at Ripley's Aquarium as a mermaid. In the episode Bogged Down in Love, Chelsey begins to date Jared and the two get married in the season one finale.
- Amanda Lee Adams—Amanda was a part of the Darlin' Dog hot-dog business in the first season, but is now a cocktail waitress at The Bowery Bar. Adams was arrested on April 26, 2013 and charged with DUI. Police discovered Adams and her black Jeep Wrangler smashed head-on into an electric pole. She admitted to "consuming three beers and four shots", then took a breathalyzer test and blew a .20, which is more than twice the legal limit in South Carolina.
- Kevin Horseman – Kevin joined the series in the 3rd season, and is Amanda's boyfriend. "Calvin" is his nickname from Marvin.
- Gina Shelley—Gina is a co-owner of the park's hair salon, Tangulls.
- Roy Bullard—Roy is a former drag queen and also a co-owner of Tangulls. He is also a pageant coach and judge.
- Anne Johnson—Anne is a former teacher. She has two sons.
- Taylor J. Burt-Taylor is Anne's entrepreneur son. He has an on and off relationship with Jessica Burke. Taylor left the series after season 1.
- Jessica Burke-Taylor's on and off again girlfriend. Jessica leaves the series after season 1 but returns in season 3.
- Jared Stetson— Jared develops a relationship with Chelsey over the course of the first season and the couple gets married in the season-one finale.
- Lindsay Colbert -Chelsea's first roommate and partner of Darlin’ Dog, was evicted from the park after starting a fight with Amanda in season 1.
- Marvin Gerald—Marvin is the head of security at the park.
- Roger "Bandit" Kelly—Bandit writes show tunes. He was evicted in the first season, but has since moved back in.
- Miss Peggy Beaulieu—Miss Peggy is Myrtle Manor's oldest resident; she's lived there for over 30 years.
- Brittney Austin -Brittney joined the series in the second season, and is a new resident of Myrtle Manor. She works at a fragrance kiosk.
- Brock Reiman-Brock joined the series in the second season, and is the handyman at Myrtle Manor.
- Kimberly Evans-Kimberly is the third new cast member Welcome to Myrtle Manor. She's a four-year resident of Myrtle Manor, and is the housekeeping supervisor at Ocean Park Resort.
- Stephania Schmidt-Stephania is another new resident of Myrtle Manor, and is the fourth new addition to the cast. She is of Spanish and German descent.

== Episodes ==
=== Series overview ===
Season	Episodes	Originally released	
Season	Episodes	First released	Last released
1	10	March 3, 2013	May 5, 2013
2	10	January 16, 2014	March 20, 2014
3	10	February 26, 2015	April 23, 2015

=== Season 1 (2013) ===
No. overall	No. in season	Title	Original release date	U.S. viewers (millions)
1	1	"A Five-Star Resort"	March 3, 2013	1.31
Becky starts the transformation of the mobile home community into a resort by opening up a community pool.
2	2	"All Tangulled Up"	March 10, 2013	0.92
The local beauty salon in the park gets shut down and the girls try to save their almost bankrupt hotdog business.
3	3	"Days of Our Trailer Park Lives"	March 17, 2013	1.15
Everyone in Myrtle Manor discusses a discovery in Taylor and Jessica's trailer and Jared scores a job at a nearby miniature golf course.
4	4	"Trouble in Weiner-dise"	March 24, 2013	1.24
Myrtle Manor is divided following Taylor and Jessica's dramatic split. Lindsay and Amanda feud which causes tension at Darlin' Dogs. Anne is distraught when her cat becomes ill but the community comes together to provide their support.
5	5	"Queen of the Trailer Park"	March 31, 2013	0.92
After Lindsay and Amanda's fight, Becky plans a Miss Myrtle Manor beauty pageant in order to restore the peace with Roy and Gina running the show.
6	6	"Unhitched"	April 7, 2013	0.96
Becky is able to ease up when her father goes away for vacation. Chelsey works as Jared's nurse after his motorcycle crash.
7	7	"Investigations and Altercations"	April 14, 2013	1.04
The residents have a community yard sale but Becky is under scrutiny from Cecil, who chooses to change things around the park. Marvin closes his mattress investigation with a town meeting revealing the culprit.
8	8	"Bogged Down in Love"	April 21, 2013	0.98
It's time for Myrtle Manor's "Chicken Bog" cook-off but things take a turn for the worse when someone wreaks havoc. Jared starts to think about getting a better paying job in order to continue his growing relationship with Chelsey.
9	9	"Where There's Smoke, There's Jared"	April 28, 2013	1.05
Taylor invites Bandit back into the park. Cecil contemplates selling Myrtle Manor. Jared realizes that Chelsey is the love of his life and has a surprise for her.
10	10	"My Big Fat Trailer Park Wedding"	May 5, 2013	1.22
Wedding bells are ringing at Myrtle Manor, which means Becky has some major prep work to do. Chelsey learns that her family won't be able to attend her wedding.

=== Season 2 (2014) ===
No. overall	No. in season	Title	Original release date	U.S. viewers (millions)
11	1	"Something's Fishy in the Manor"	January 16, 2014	1.23
In the second season premiere, Becky is put to the test. Amanda wants to bring the park together so she organizes a party. Jared is feeling unsettled about Chelsey, so he decides to do some investigating.
12	2	"The Handyman Can"	January 23, 2014	1.07
Bandit returns to the park in hopes of being able to move back in. Becky hires a new handyman. Marvin is called to figure out what's going on with a resident.
13	3	"Doublewide Pride"	January 30, 2014	1.28
Marvin is working hard on his case of the missing panties. A local radio station announces the best trailer park in Myrtle Beach, with Myrtle Manor hoping to take the lead. Amanda works on losing a few pounds.
14	4	"May the Horse Be With You"	February 6, 2014	1.15
Marvin receives a horse to patrol the park on. Jared tries to find a way to silence Chelsey's snoring but ends up being put out of the trailer. Amanda plans a girls getaway.
15	5	"Peggy Get Your Gun"	February 13, 2014	0.92
The community is confused when the silver bullet trailer is missing. Tensions rise between Myrtle Manor and a rival park. Amanda starts dating. Bandit and Marvin make a surprise appearance at Chelsey and Jared's honeymoon.
16	6	"A Pain in the Gas"	February 20, 2014	0.88
Jared and Chelsey test their parenting skills. The rival trailer park managers settle their differences with a car race.
17	7	"Star Spangled Manor"	February 27, 2014	0.85
Jared receives an offer to play the national anthem at a baseball game. Amanda makes Miss Peggy an online dating profile. Marvin gets a break in his rat investigation.
18	8	"The Dark Night Rises"	March 6, 2014	1.18
Myrtle Manor comes together during a power outage. Bandit finds a new way to make money. Anne gets some shocking news regarding her health.
19	9	"To Catch a Rat"	March 13, 2014	1.22
Marvin thinks he has solved the rat case. Jared is offered a music gig. Brittany and Amanda get into a physical altercation
20	10	"Let the Trailer Park Games Begin"	March 20, 2014	1.12
Myrtle Manor and Village Creek finally settle their rivalry. The park comes together to plan a birthday celebration for Miss Peggy. Amanda decides it's time for her to leave the park. Jared and Chelsey think they're ready to start a family.

=== Season 3 (2015) ===
No. overall	No. in season	Title	Original release date	U.S. viewers (millions)
21	1	"Hello, Baby!"	February 26, 2015	N/A
Everyone celebrates Anne's cancer remission in true trailer park fashion. Jared and Chelsey make their return to Myrtle Beach with their newest family member in tow. And Amanda hosts a mysterious guest inside the trailer.
22	2	"Jared Gets a Big Boy Job"	March 5, 2015	N/A
To support his young family, Jared gets in over his head working at a used car lot. Amanda is involved in a love triangle with Brock and a new suitor. And the park buzzes with speculation as Bandit might be dating a familiar foe to Myrtle Manor.
23	3	"Trailer Park Secrets"	March 12, 2015	N/A
Bandit's dirty little secret is out and Becky is livid. Amanda's new live-in boyfriend causes stress in an already cramped trailer. And in an effort to help Kim find love, Marvin and Anne take her to a church speed-dating event.
24	4	"Full Moonshine"	March 19, 2015	N/A
Tensions flare in Amanda's trailer, forcing her roommates to spend the night under the stars. Jared tries to spice up his marriage planning a romantic evening with Chelsey. Finally, Cecil makes a divisive executive decision about the park.
25	5	"Trailer Park Boss"	March 26, 2015	N/A
Much to Becky's dismay, Roxy joins Myrtle Manor. Amanda's attempt to make up with Chelsey with a birthday BBQ goes awry. And, friendships are tested when romance blossoms between Jessica and Brock.
26	6	"Manor Meltdown"	April 2, 2015	N/A
Roxy schemes up a plan to gain the residents' respect. Marvin and Anne start to question their future together. And the love triangle between Brock, Jessica, and Britney gets more complicated when he moves into the trailer in their front yard.
27	7	"Trailer Park Birthday"	April 9, 2015	0.79
The whole trailer park pitches in to make Miss Peggy's 80th birthday unforgettable, including treating her to a makeover and male dancers. Gina becomes irritated with Roy's frequent absences from Tangulls. Amanda comes up with a new idea to make money.
28	8	"We're Gonna Rock This Park"	April 16, 2015	N/A
Roxy throws a concert starring the Bandit, but Becky isn't happy about it; Brock drunkenly kisses Jessica's best friend, threatening their growing romance.
29	9	"Now Will You Marry Me?"	April 23, 2015	N/A
Becky tries to get Roxy fired, but her plan backfires; Cecil gives Roxy more power in the park; Marvin readies himself for a second proposal to Anne; a plan to get back at Brock.
30	10	"We Oughta Be Committed"	April 23, 2015	N/A
Becky is perturbed when Roxy plans to replace her pool; the ladies crash Marvin's bachelor party.

== Economic impact ==
A Coastal Carolina University study determined the show's annual economic contribution to the Myrtle Beach area to be $101 million. Over $2 million of that was direct spending by those producing the show. Sales of show-related products totalled $800,000. If an episode was assumed to be equal in promotion value to a 30-second ad, the value was $3.3 million. The remainder assumed that 1 percent of visitors considered the show to have influenced their decision to come to Myrtle Beach.
