= McMillions =

True crime documentary television series

- Genre: True crime; Documentary series
- Written by: James Lee Hernandez; Brian Lazarte
- Directed by: James Lee Hernandez; Brian Lazarte
- Composer: Pinar Toprak
- Country of origin: United States
- Original language: English
- No. of seasons: 1
- No. of episodes: 6

Production
- Executive producers: Mark Wahlberg; Stephen Levinson; Archie Gips; James Lee Hernandez; Brian Lazarte
- Cinematography: Jeff Dolen
- Production companies: Unrealistic Ideas; FunMeter

Original release
- Network: HBO
- Release: February 3 – March 9, 2020

McMillions (stylized as McMillion$) is a documentary miniseries about the McDonald's Monopoly promotion scam that occurred between 1989 and 2001. Directed by James Lee Hernandez and Brian Lazarte, the series details how the scam was perpetrated by Jerry Jacobson, the head of security for the agency that ran the promotion, and how he recruited a wide range of accomplices. The series premiered in the US on February 3, 2020, on HBO, and all episodes were made available in the UK on May 27, 2020, on Sky Documentaries. McMillions was nominated for five Primetime Creative Arts Emmy Awards, including Outstanding Documentary or Nonfiction Series.

== Premise ==
McMillions "examines the $24 million worth of fraud that corrupted the McDonald's Monopoly game between 1989 and 2001, in which there were almost no legitimate million-dollar winners in the contest." Through six episodes, the documentary introduces the FBI and other legal authorities who investigated the Monopoly game heist, as well as the bogus winners and the perpetrators. Using in-depth interviews with those involved in every aspect of the crime, McMillions offers an insider's view into one of the most notorious fraud cases of the 1990s and early 2000s.

== Episodes ==
No.	Title	Directed by	Original release date	U.S viewers (millions)
1	"Episode 1"	James Lee Hernandez & Brian Lazarte	February 3, 2020	0.339
An anonymous tip to FBI agent Doug Mathews speaks of a con surrounding the much-beloved McDonald's Monopoly game and its mysterious mastermind, a man going by the moniker of "Uncle Jerry".
2	"Episode 2"	James Lee Hernandez & Brian Lazarte	February 10, 2020	0.421
Hoping to unmask "Uncle Jerry", the FBI investigates two prominent figures they believe are connected to the scam. Agent Mathews and McDonald's employee Amy Murray pay a visit to a prior winner, who sweats and mumbles as their cameras roll.
3	"Episode 3"	James Lee Hernandez & Brian Lazarte	February 17, 2020	0.402
Frank Colombo reveals how "Uncle Jerry" would sell the winning tickets to his brother, Gennaro "Jerry" Colombo, for a premium. The undercover FBI video crew interviews a winner who tries to obscure the origins of her million-dollar game ticket.
4	"Episode 4"	James Lee Hernandez & Brian Lazarte	February 24, 2020	0.383
Gennaro "Jerry" Colombo lands in the ICU, leading Jerome "Jerry" Jacobson to scout for new recruiters. Dwight Baker and others join the operation. The FBI gathers intel on "Uncle Jerry's" middlemen and ends up tailing Dwight to the airport.
5	"Episode 5"	James Lee Hernandez & Brian Lazarte	March 2, 2020	0.404
Focusing their attention on Dwight Baker, the FBI intercepts a call with "Uncle Jerry" that leads them to capture evidence of a game piece exchange. The FBI works overtime to launch a coordinated cross-country day of indictments.
6	"Episode 6"	James Lee Hernandez & Brian Lazarte	March 9, 2020	0.424
As the trial nears, many of the defendants take plea deals, but George Chandler and others decide to fight to prove their innocence. When Jerome "Jerry" Jacobson takes the stand, the remaining details of how he pulled off his scheme are disclosed.

== Production ==
On July 28, 2018, The Daily Beast published a detailed article chronicling the McDonald's Monopoly scandal written by Jeff Maysh. On August 2, Deadline Hollywood announced that a true-crime story based on Maysh's article was up for auction, with the high bid placed by 20th Century Fox, beating other bids from Universal, Netflix, and Warner Bros. The proposed film adaptation would feature Ben Affleck as director, Pearl Street and David Klawans as producers, and Matt Damon in a starring role.

Before the Fox project was realized, Mark Wahlberg's Unrealistic Ideas agreed to produce a true crime series based on the rigged Monopoly game at McDonald's. The series is executive produced by Unrealistic Ideas' Mark Wahlberg, Stephen Levinson, Archie Gips and written, directed and also executive produced by James Lee Hernandez and Brian Lazarte.

== Critical reception ==
On Rotten Tomatoes, the series had an 87% rating with an average score of 7.29 out of 10 based on 31 reviews. The site's critical consensus read: "Like something out of a movie, McMillions effectively — if not always artfully — captures the chaos of this once-in-a-lifetime, very real con and the colorful cast of characters at its center." On Metacritic, it had a score of 72 out of 100 based on 15 reviews, indicating "generally favorable reviews".

== Awards and nominations ==
Year	Award	Category	Nominee(s)	Result	Ref.
2020	Primetime Emmy Awards	Outstanding Documentary or Nonfiction Series	Mark Wahlberg, Stephen Levinson, Archie Gips, James Lee Hernandez, Brian Lazarte, Nancy Abraham and Lisa Heller	Nominated	
2020	Primetime Emmy Awards	Outstanding Music Composition for a Documentary Series or Special (Original Dramatic Score)	Pinar Toprak & Alex Kovacs (for "Episode 1")	Nominated	
2020	Primetime Emmy Awards	Outstanding Picture Editing for Nonfiction Programming	Jody McVeigh-Schultz, Lane Farnham, James Lee Hernandez, Brian Lazarte and Scott Hanson (for "Episode 3")	Nominated	
2020	Primetime Emmy Awards	Outstanding Sound Editing for a Nonfiction or Reality Program (Single or Multi-Camera)	Ben Freer, Jordan Meltzer and Jody McVeigh-Schultz (for "Episode 1")	Nominated	
2020	Primetime Emmy Awards	Outstanding Writing for Nonfiction Programming	James Lee Hernandez and Brian Lazarte (for "Episode 1")	Nominated	
2020	TCA Awards	Outstanding Achievement in News and Information	McMillions	Nominated	
2021	Hollywood Music in Media Awards	Best Original Score in a Documentary TV Series	Pinar Toprak	Nominated	
2021	Producers Guild of America Awards	Outstanding Producer of Non-Fiction Television	Mark Wahlberg, Stephen Levinson, Archie Gips, James Lee Hernandez and Brian Lazarte	Nominated	
