= Loveless in Los Angeles =

- Directed by: Archie Gips
- Written by: Archie Gips
- Starring: Dash Mihok; Brittany Daniel; Navi Rawat; Geoffrey Arend; James Lesure; Chris Coppola; Stephen Tobolowsky
- Distributed by: Allumination Filmworks; Slamdance
- Release date: May 29, 2007
- Running time: 93 minutes
- Country: United States
- Language: English

Loveless in Los Angeles, an indie romantic comedy film completed in 2006 and written and directed by Archie Gips, stars Dash Mihok, Brittany Daniel, Navi Rawat, Geoffrey Arend, James Lesure, Chris Coppola and Stephen Tobolowsky.

== Plot ==
Dave Randall, a jaded, womanizing, reality dating TV producer, runs into his old college crush, Kelly, and soon realizes his bar-hopping, bed-hopping ways are leaving him unfulfilled. Dave has Kelly — the only woman he's ever loved — re-train him to become the nice guy he used to be.
