= Robert Sears (physician) =

American physician and vaccine critic

Robert W. Sears
- Occupation: Pediatrician
- Known for: Controversial book on vaccines and alternative vaccine schedules Autism-related pseudoscience Anti-vaccine activism
- Parent(s): William and Martha Sears

Robert William Sears, known as Dr. Bob, is an American pediatrician from Capistrano Beach, California, noted for his unorthodox and dangerous views on childhood vaccination. While Sears has acknowledged the efficacy of vaccines, he has also proposed alternative vaccination schedules that depart from accepted medical recommendations. Additionally, Sears has falsely suggested vaccine preservatives and adjuvants (such as thimerosal and aluminum) are unsafe, falsely linked vaccines to autism, and promoted various discredited, unproven, and potentially dangerous alternative autism treatments and prophylactics (including chelation therapy and hyperbaric oxygen therapy). His proposals have enjoyed celebrity endorsement, but are not supported by medical evidence and have contributed to dangerous under-vaccination in the national child population. While he denies being anti-vaccine, Sears has been described by many as anti-vaccine and as a vaccine delayer.

== Views on vaccines ==
Sears is known for his views on vaccine scheduling. He recommends that parents avoid or delay vaccinating their children, counter to the consensus recommendations of medical bodies, and his book recommends that parents follow his two alternative vaccine schedules, rather than that of the American Academy of Pediatrics. His proposals are popular with parents who are influenced by incorrect information propagated by anti-vaccination activists who seek a "compromise" between embracing and avoiding vaccination. This has contributed to under-vaccination in the US child population, putting public health at risk.

In 2014, Sears said that he thinks "the disease danger is low enough where I think you can safely raise an unvaccinated child in today's society."

Although he is characterized as an anti-vaccine doctor and a vaccine delayer, Sears does say that vaccines work: "Chicken pox, measles, whooping cough, polio, diphtheria, all these diseases that we no longer see very much of anymore, I do say that the vaccines are responsible for getting rid of these." Sears is against mandatory vaccination.

Sears has encouraged parents who choose not to vaccinate their children not to tell others of their decision, writing: "I also warn them not to share their fears with their neighbors, because if too many people avoid the MMR, we'll likely see the diseases increase significantly." This position has been criticized as encouraging "free riding" on the herd immunity created by those who do vaccinate: "This is clearly immoral free-riding, it demonstrates a willingness to make unfair use of the contributions others have made to social cooperation." In 2008, Sears told the New York Times that 20% of his patients do not vaccinate at all, and that another 20% vaccinated partially. He also said that “I don’t think [vaccination] is such a critical public health issue that we should force parents into it." He continues to convey these views on his popular podcast, The Vaccine Conversation. Dorit Reiss rejects the podcast episodes as a source of medical information, as they "repeat anti-vaccine talking points, overstate vaccine risks and understate the benefits".

Sears opposed California Senate Bill 277, a California state law finalized in June 2015 that eliminated non-medical vaccine exemptions. While advocating against passage of the law during an April 2015 Senate hearing, Sears acknowledged it would not prevent patients from seeking medical exemptions or penalize doctors for granting them. He claimed that he opposed it because, in his experience, many doctors would not take reports of prior adverse vaccine reactions seriously and could not be relied upon to issue medically indicated exemptions.

In a June 2015 Facebook post, Sears compared non-vaccinating parents to Nazi-persecuted Jews. Sears later edited out the Holocaust comparison and added an apology to the end of the post. In a piece published by The Daily Beast, pediatrician Daniel Summers labeled the comparison "disgraceful":

"To compare the plight of the Jews under Hitler to that of those who willingly forego a preventive treatment that safeguards not only the health of their children, but the community as a whole is to lose all moral grounding. It is to purloin the most appalling suffering of the 20th century’s greatest victims, and assign it to those whose choices make not only themselves but their neighbors less safe. It is repulsive.... Dr. Bob Sears should be ashamed of himself."

=== Vaccines and autism ===
In his 2010 book, The Autism Book, Sears recommended any child diagnosed with autism not be vaccinated further and said he respected parents' decisions not to vaccinate younger siblings out of an abundance of caution. He also falsely suggested autistic children (especially those who were given any vaccine containing the preservative thimerosal) might benefit from chelation therapy to clear their bodies of mercury and other heavy metals. Sears claimed "the mainstream medical community" was using the death of an autistic child inadvertently given the wrong chelation agent to unfairly demonize the treatment. He also falsely claimed traditional heavy-metal blood tests were not reliable and that parents should instead consider how much thimerosal their children were exposed to through vaccinations and how well they responded to other biomedical treatments to determine if chelation was warranted.

In The Autism Book, Sears further claimed some children could fully recover from autism (which is actually lifelong and incurable), directed readers to the websites of several anti-vaccine organizations (including AutismOne, Generation Rescue, SafeMinds and Talk About Curing Autism), and promoted various other discredited or unproven means of treating or preventing autism (including intravenous immunoglobin therapy, hyperbaric oxygen therapy, and gluten-free, casein-free diets).

In a September 2019 interview with the Los Angeles Times, Sears alleged it was "biologically plausible" that the MMR vaccine was linked to autism, a long-debunked claim popularized by the fraudulent research of anti-vaccine activist Andrew Wakefield and colleagues. Sears also suggested vaccines may be the reason behind increasing autism prevalence (which experts have largely attributed to greater awareness and changes to diagnostic criteria). Pediatrician Paul Offit told the publication Sears was taking advantage of the fact that scientists cannot prove a negative to give the false impression that it was still an open question as to whether vaccines and autism were linked. In response to Offit, Sears acknowledged existing studies did not support such a link, but disputed that one could definitively conclude that no link existed.

In a March 2025 post to his official website, Sears falsely claimed thimerosal was a "known neurotoxin" that posed an elevated risk to children and pregnant women; he also falsely claimed that no thorough, independent research had proven flu shots contained a safe amount of it. Sears further falsely alleged aluminum adjuvants used in vaccines were a neurotoxin that could accumulate in the brain and potentially "contribut[e] to neurological conditions," including Alzheimer's disease and autism.

It is scientific consensus that there is no link between any vaccine or vaccine ingredient and autism and that the aluminum and thimerosal sometimes used in vaccines are not harmful. Chelation therapy has never been proven effective to treat autism and has sometimes resulted in death or other serious complications when improperly administered to autistic children.

=== Alternative vaccine schedules ===
In 2007, Sears published The Vaccine Book: Making the Right Decision For Your Child through the Sears Parenting Library, and, as of 2012, it had sold more than 180,000 copies, and garnered support from celebrities. The book includes his two alternative vaccine schedules: "Dr Bob’s Selective Vaccine Schedule" is for those "who want to decline or to delay vaccines". "Dr Bob's Alternative Vaccine Schedule" is for those "who worry that children are receiving too many vaccines too early". This schedule involves spreading out the vaccines received by the child, and separating some vaccines that would otherwise be combined. The book has been described by Vox as "basically a guide to skipping vaccines," and that "it may as well be called The Anti-Vaccine Book."

Sears has said that he created his alternative vaccine schedules to allow parents to vaccinate their children "in a more gradual manner" rather than by following the schedule recommended by the Centers for Disease Control and Prevention (CDC). His notions, for example that vaccination risks causing "antigenic overload", are, however, based on misconceptions and not sound scientific evidence. On an episode of All In with Chris Hayes, Sears admitted that there was no published, peer-reviewed evidence to support the notion of vaccine overload, and that "my precautions about spreading out vaccines are theoretical, a theoretical benefit to kids..." Health journalist Julia Belluz has stated: "From a scientific standpoint, Sears is a quack: while he claims to be a vaccines expert, he is not a researcher and has never conducted his own vaccine science." Regarding his theory of vaccine overload, "according to the data mustered by the scientific community, he's simply wrong."

In 2008, Sears' "intentionally undervaccinated" seven-year-old patient was identified as the index patient who started a measles epidemic in 2008, an epidemic which was the largest outbreak in San Diego since 1991. The epidemic "resulted in 839 exposed persons, 11 additional cases (all in unvaccinated children), and the hospitalization of an infant too young to be vaccinated....[with] a net public-sector cost of $10,376 per case.... 48 children too young to be vaccinated were quarantined, at an average family cost of $775 per child".

=== Reception ===
Sears' viewpoints and The Vaccine Book have been criticized by the press and numerous medical professionals.

Offit wrote that "Sears sounds many antivaccine messages" in the book. Sears has been criticized by David Gorski, who wrote that Sears is anti-vaccine, and by Emily Willingham, who has dismissed The Vaccine Book as "non-evidence-based." Steven Novella criticized the book's attempt to tell both sides of, and assume a moderate position in, the vaccine debate as like "trying to compromise between mutually exclusive positions, like Young Earth creationism and evolution".

Pediatrician Rahul Parikh has said Sears is someone whose "understanding of vaccines is deeply flawed," that his Vaccine Book "is a nightmare for pediatricians like me," and "is peppered with misleading innuendo and factual errors". He also writes that "Sears misleads parents," using "tactics [like] soft science, circular logic, reporting rumors and outright falsehoods".

Peter Lipson, a physician who writes about the intersection of science and the media, states that "...Sears is a useful (although hardly unique) example of a dangerous doctor.... Despite his protestations that he is not 'anti-vaccine', his language and his recommendations very clearly guide parents to be suspicious of vaccination and to avoid the safe and effective recommended vaccination schedule." Lipson also considers it less than coincidental that Orange County, California, the same county where Sears practices, has "reported the highest rate of measles in the state last year. It’s also home to some of the state’s highest numbers of unvaccinated children. Of the 20 people infected by the current outbreak [at Disneyland], at least 15 were not vaccinated." Lipson has also written that "The anti-vaccine movement has been driven by lay people such as Jenny McCarthy, and disgraced doctors such as Andrew Wakefield, the author of the fraudulent autism-vaccine paper. He's no longer permitted to practice medicine. But there have been a few actual licensed medical voices over the last several years fighting to keep our kids sick" and said that such doctors should also lose their licenses. As examples of such doctors, Lipson named Sears, Jay Gordon, and Jack Wolfson. Sears responded to Lipson's article in an email. Lipson's response was an extensive point-by-point refutation of each point in the email, a technique known as fisking.

Arthur Caplan calls Sears an "anti-vaxx pediatrician who favors alternative medicine". He also discusses Sears and similar physicians, calling for the revocation of "the license of any doctor who opposes vaccination". He believes they are purveyors of "junk science" who are in violation of the American Medical Association's Code of Ethics. He also states that "California’s medical licensing board frowns on doctors who endanger the public health, and says that 'the board shall take action against any licensee' charged with unprofessional conduct, incompetence or dishonesty. That unprofessionalism is not, the courts have said, limited to 'the actual treatment of a patient.' Sears is squarely in violation."

At an AMA House of Delegates' committee hearing, David T. Tayloe, former president of the American Academy of Pediatrics, expressed his opposition to non-medical exemptions and mentioned Sears in that connection:

"The AMA does not need to leave a loophole in its policy for the likes of Jenny McCarthy, Bob Sears, etc ... Our vaccines are extremely safe, and children need to be immunized at 90% or more to achieve herd immunity, and we can't do this with choice."

John Oliver talked about Sears on his show "Last Week Tonight" in a segment about vaccines. Oliver criticized Sears' attempts to make parents comfortable with alternative vaccine scheduling, commenting that "Your job is ... not to make parents feel comfortable. You're a pediatrician, not a flask of whiskey tucked into a Baby Bjorn." Oliver also referred to Sears as an "Opportunist quack [sic] writing books that fan the flames of people's unfounded fears."

=== Accusation of medical negligence ===
On September 8, 2016, the Medical Board of California released a six-page opinion accusing Sears of "gross negligence", "Repeated Negligent Acts", and "Failure to Maintain Adequate and Accurate Records". If found negligent, he faces a variety of sanctions, including revocation of his medical license.

=== 2018 and 2020 probation orders ===
On June 27, 2018, the Medical Board of California placed Sears on 35 months of probation after he settled a case in which the board accused him of writing a doctor's note exempting a two-year-old child from vaccinations without obtaining the basic information necessary for decision making prior to excluding the possibility of future vaccines, leaving the patient and his mother, as well as future contacts, at risk for preventable and communicable diseases. Per the terms of his probation, Sears was required to take 40 hours of medical education courses annually, attend an ethics class, and be monitored by a supervising doctor; he was also required to notify hospitals and facilities of the order and was prohibited from supervising physician assistants or nurse practitioners. Sears denied wrongdoing, saying in a Facebook post, "Isn’t it my job to listen to my patients and believe what a parent says happened to her baby? Isn’t that what all doctors do with their patients?" and, "After all, I don’t want a child to receive a medical treatment that could cause more harm. I am going to first do no harm, every time."

In June 2019, the Medical Board of California brought a new complaint against Sears, accusing him of improperly issuing childhood-long vaccination exemptions to two patients in May 2016: a 7-year-old boy who had been diagnosed with psoriasis, and his sister (age undisclosed) who had been diagnosed with a bee-sting allergy, a viral infection, and feeding difficulties. Both patients had a family history of autoimmune, gastrointestinal, psychiatric, and neurodevelopmental conditions. Sears allegedly recorded the chief medical complaint of both patients as "vaccine exemption". According to the board, neither their own diagnoses nor their family medical histories qualified the siblings for vaccine exemptions. Sears disputed the allegations, claiming vaccines could trigger or exacerbate psoriasis and that he had appropriately considered the patients' family histories.

In September 2019, the board filed an amended complaint against Sears that also accused him of improperly issuing childhood-long vaccine exemptions to two other children (ages 4 and 12) in 2016; the complaint alleged the 4-year-old did not qualify for any exemption and the 12-year-old only qualified for a partial exemption. The amended complaint also alleged Sears failed to maintain adequate records in the case of a 10-year-old patient he examined in 2017 who was experiencing numbness in both knees.

In April 2020, Sears agreed to settle the amended 2019 complaint; the settlement was formally implemented in June 2020. As part of the agreement, Sears' probation was extended for an additional two years under similar terms.

== Personal life ==
Sears is one of eight children born to William Sears, a pediatrician and founder of the Sears Parenting Library, and Martha Sears, a registered nurse and author of parenting books. Sears received his medical degree from Georgetown University in 1995 and completed his pediatric training at Children's Hospital Los Angeles in 1998. Sears credits his interest in vaccines to reading DPT: A Shot in the Dark (1985) as a medical student. It is an anti-vaccination book positing that the whooping cough vaccine was dangerous. It sparked "a backlash against vaccines". The book has been heavily criticized in the years since its publication, owing to numerous changes to the whooping cough vaccine.

== Selected works ==
- Father's First Steps (2006). (ISBN 155832335X)
- The Vaccine Book: Making the Right Decision For Your Child (2007). (ISBN 978-0316180528)
- The Premature Baby Book: Everything You Need to Know About Your Premature Baby from Birth to Age One (2008). With William Sears (ISBN 978-0316738224)
- The Autism Book: What Every Parent Needs to Know About Early Detection, Treatment, Recovery, and Prevention (2010). (ISBN 978-0316042802)

== See also ==
- MMR vaccine and autism
- Vaccine hesitancy
