= Dr. Sears =

Dr. Sears may refer to:

- Robert Sears (physician)
- William Sears (physician)
