= Mother McAuley Liberal Arts High School =

Roman Catholic high school in Chicago, Illinois, United States

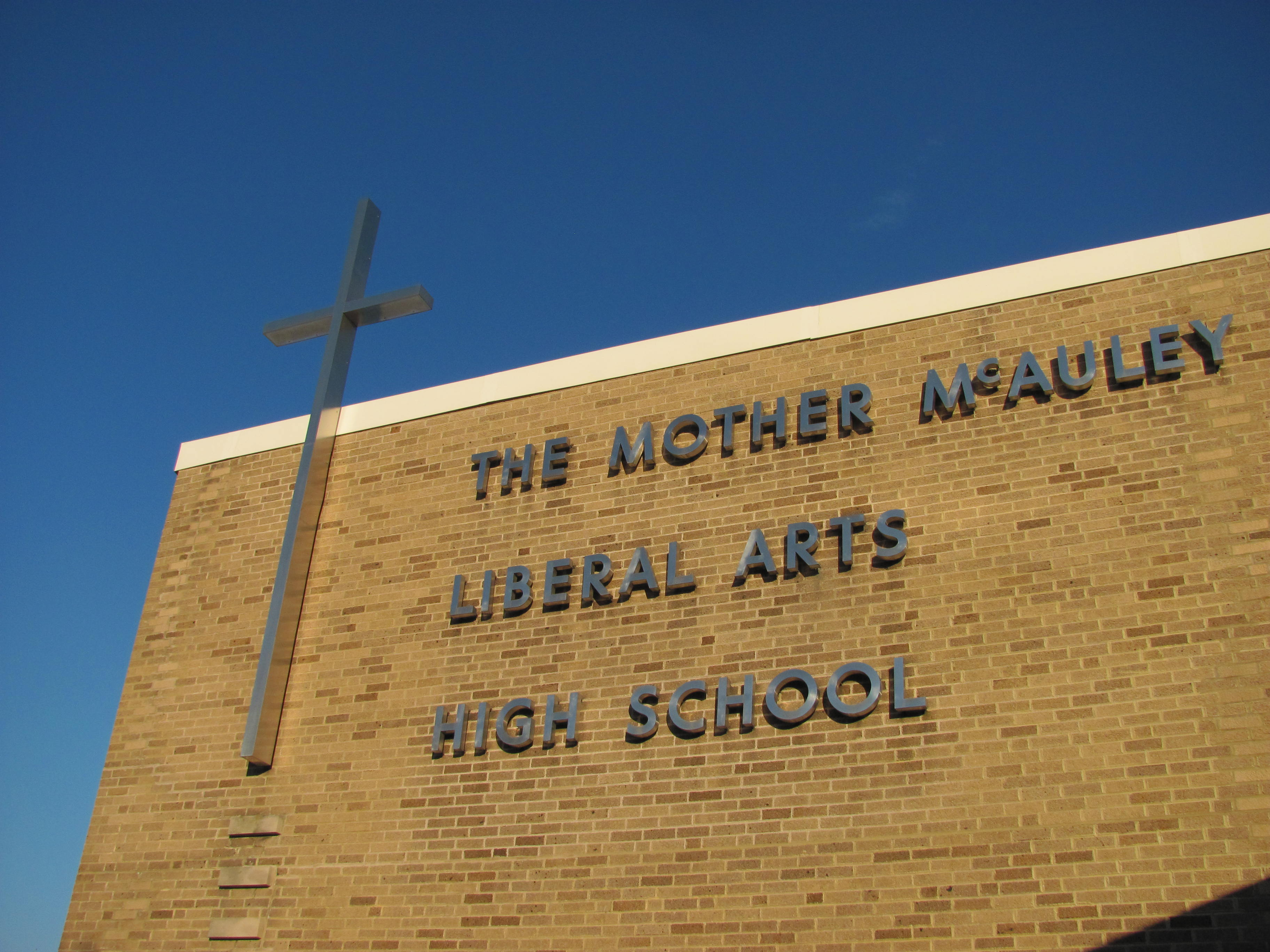

Location
- 3737 West 99th Street; Chicago, Illinois 60655; United States; 41°42′46″N 87°42′57″W

Information
- Former name: St. Francis Xavier Academy for Females
- School type: Private, High school
- Motto: Empowering courageous women to change the world
- Religious affiliation: Roman Catholic
- Established: 1846; 180 years ago
- Authority: Archdiocese of Chicago
- Oversight: Sisters of Mercy
- President: Carey Temple Harrington '86
- Principal: Dr. Kathryn Baal, Ph.D.
- Teaching staff: 73.8 (FTE) (2019-2020)
- Grades: 9–12
- Gender: All-Girls
- Enrollment: 772 (2024-25)
- Student to teacher ratio: 15:1 (2024-25)
- Campus: Urban
- Colors: Red; White; Gold
- Athletics conference: Girls Catholic Athletic Conference
- Mascot: Mighty Mac
- Nickname: Mighty Macs
- Accreditation: Cognia
- Publication: Inscape (alumnae and donor magazine); Equinox (annual art and literary magazine)
- Tuition: $14,700 (2024-2025)
- Affiliations: Illinois State Board of Education; Mercy Education
- Website: www.mothermcauley.org

Mother McAuley Liberal Arts High School is an all-girls Catholic high school located in the Mount Greenwood neighborhood of Chicago, Illinois at 3737 West 99th Street. It is located in the Roman Catholic Archdiocese of Chicago.

== History ==
A small group of Mercy Sisters arrived in Chicago in 1846, led by Frances Warde, Catherine McAuley's closest friend. Within weeks, they opened a "select school" that became St. Francis Xavier Academy for Females, the first school chartered in the city of Chicago. The course of study covered primary, secondary and collegiate levels. The first building was located on Wabash Avenue between Madison and Monroe Streets. In 1871, the Chicago Fire destroyed the original building. St. Francis Academy relocated to 29th and Wabash for a short time, then to a larger location at 49th and Cottage Grove in 1900.

In the 1950s, the southwest side of Chicago needed a Catholic girls' school to serve a fast-growing population. In 1956 "the Academy" relocated once again. Mother McAuley Liberal Arts High School and St. Xavier College opened in the fall of 1956 to serve secondary and post secondary women students respectively. McAuley opened with 523 students, 300 of which were first year students. That same year, the Archdiocese of Chicago purchased 22 adjacent acres from the Mercy Sisters to sell to the Christian Brothers of Ireland to open their second all male high school in Chicago Brother Rice High School which is one of largest all male high schools in the United States.

McAuley continues to expand. Today, approximately 1200 young women and 95 faculty and staff members form the McAuley community.

== School Shield ==
The official insignia of Mother Mcauley High School, the shield, takes elements of the Mercy Shield, the shield of the founding Mercy Sisters. It combines the symbol of charity and caring together, symbols that represent Mother Mary Catherine McAuley. The final two symbols, the Cross and the Flame, are said to represent sacrifice and charity, combine together to represent the pattern of Christian living that Mother McAuley High School instills in its students.

== Athletics ==
Mother McAuley competes in the Girls Catholic Athletic Conference (GCAC). Mother McAuley is also a member of the Illinois High School Association (IHSA), which governs most of the athletic and competitive activities in Illinois. The teams are referred to as the Mighty Macs.

The Athletic Department sponsors interscholastic teams in basketball, cross country, golf, soccer, softball, swimming & diving, tennis, track & field, volleyball, bowling, lacrosse and water polo.

The following teams have finished in the top four of their IHSA sponsored state tournament or meet:

- Basketball: 4th place (1989–90, 1993–94); 2nd place (1994–95, 2018–19); State Champions (1990–91)
- Cross Country: 4th place (2006–07)
- Volleyball: 4th place (1991–92); 3rd place (1990–91, 2005–06, 2008–09, 2012–13); 2nd place (1983–84, 1996–97, 2007–08, 2021-22); State Champions (1977–78, 1980–81, 1981–82, 1982–83, 1984–85, 1985–86, 1987–88, 1992–93, 1994–95, 1995–96, 1997–98, 2000–01, 2004–05, 2013–14, 2016–17, 2022–23, 2023–24, 2026-27)
- Water Polo: 4th place (2004–05, 2005–06, 2010–11); Third place (2012–13); 2nd place (2003–04, 2007–08, 2022–23); State Champions (2001–02, 2002–03, 2006–07)

The volleyball team holds the state records for regional, sectional, and state championships, in addition to appearances at the state tournament and top four finishes.

As of 2009, the water polo team holds the state record for appearances in the state tournament and top four finishes.

== Notable alumnae ==
- Jenny McCarthy (class of 1990) is a model, actress, and Playboy model.
- Joanne McCarthy (class of 1992) was a professional basketball player (1998) with the ABL Chicago Condors.
- Alex Meneses is an actress.
- Emily McAsey, State Representative
- Abbey Murphy (class of 2020) is a Team USA Olympic Ice Hockey gold medalist. (Milan Cortina 2026)
- Elizabeth Ann Doody Gorman (class of 1983) was a Cook County Illinois Board Commissioner.
- Sylvia Reed Curran (class of 1975) was a long-serving American diplomat.
- Kimberly Shworles (class of 1984) Las Vegas choreographer.
- Maya-Camille Broussard (class of 1997) is a James Beard Foundation-award winning chef, entrepreneur, and author
- Katie Schumacher-Cawley (class of 1997) former Penn State basketball and volleyball player, current head coach of Penn State women's volleyball team.

== Traditions ==
In late September every year, the school hosts Mercy Day, a celebration of the founding of the Sisters of Mercy and of Catherine McAuley. This celebration includes an assembly that highlights the core values of the Mercy Education and the story of Catherine McAuley. The Catherine McAuley award is also presented to one senior student and one faculty member who best represents Catherine McAuley.

Many senior students participate in the senior retreat known as Kairos, which is a spiritual retreat. Kairos retreats occur six times a year, and many McAuley girls promote this tradition.

"Spirit Week" takes place every spring and includes five days of dressing up and activities to fit the daily theme. The week is often concluded with "Mac Pride Day" with a pep assembly.

As many all-girls schools do, at the commencement ceremony, all graduates are required to wear a white dress and white gloves, as opposed to the traditional graduation style of a cap and gown.
