= List of Wahlburgers episodes =

Wahlburgers is a reality television series on the A&E network in the United States that aired from January 22, 2014, to July 31, 2019. It is a behind-the-scenes look at the titular chain of restaurants owned by chef Paul Wahlberg and his brothers, Mark and Donnie, as well as their home lives.

During the course of the series, 95 episodes of Wahlburgers aired over ten seasons.

== Overview ==
Season	Episodes	Originally released	
Season	Episodes	First released	Last released
1	9	January 22, 2014	March 19, 2014
2	9	August 13, 2014	October 8, 2014
3	9	January 7, 2015	March 4, 2015
4	8	July 15, 2015	September 2, 2015
5	8	March 9, 2016	April 6, 2016
6	8	July 6, 2016	August 24, 2016
7	10	November 16, 2016	January 11, 2017
8	14	August 9, 2017	September 20, 2017
9	9	June 13, 2018	August 8, 2018
10	11	May 15, 2019	July 31, 2019

== Episodes ==
=== Season 1 (2014) ===
No. overall	No. in season	Title	Original release date	Prod. code	US viewers (millions)
1	1	"Who's Your Favorite?"	January 22, 2014	00/100-60	3.26
The Wahlberg family intends on expanding their hometown diner of their namesake. Head chef Paul and younger brother Donnie find a second location near Fenway Park, only Paul must convince their baby brother Mark to forgo international plans. Meanwhile, mother Alma tries to get Paul to hire an assistant to ease his stress.
2	2	"5 O'Clock is Dinnertime"	January 29, 2014	01/101	4.02
Donnie introduces his wife Jenny McCarthy to his mother and instigates a "sauce-off" between Alma and Paul, as Paul decides to create a special "Burger of the Month" for Jenny.
3	3	"Baby Knows Best"	February 5, 2014	04/104	3.48
Mark calls Paul saying he just bought a site for the next Wahlburgers location—in Canada. Paul has to take off the apron to go meet his brothers in Toronto and see the new place.
4	4	"Sibling Rivalry"	February 19, 2014	02/102	2.68
Mother Alma is left in charge of the second restaurant "Alma Nove", as Paul goes to play golf with Mark. She makes some changes to the place in Paul's absence.
5	5	"Prized Possessions"	February 26, 2014	05/105	2.31
Cousin Johnny "Drama" Alves and Billy Leonard are tasked to help Paul lose some weight over a weekend. At home, Kari and Mackenzie help Alma clean out her garage, where they find some items from Mark and Donnie's childhood.
6	6	"Eating Green"	March 5, 2014	06/106	2.89
Alma is asked by her family to share her recipes with the public. Meanwhile, Mark challenges his friend Henry "Nacho" Laun to eat divots collected from the golf course.
7	7	"The Funky Bunch"	March 12, 2014	03/103	1.53
Donnie and Mark prank Paul by suggesting a Wahlburgers jingle. They even recruit Joey McIntyre, but soon, Johnny Drama, knowing it's still a prank, wants to actually write a jingle. Soon the prank started taking on a life of its own. Elsewhere, shopaholic Alma has trouble finding the perfect gift for Jenny.
8	8	"Pauliday"	March 12, 2014	07/107	1.57
Donnie gives Paul a break and a birthday present by letting Paul drive a replica of his favorite childhood car. Meanwhile, Alma is given a spa day from the girls.
9	9	"The Real Entourage"	March 19, 2014	08/108	2.32
Mark brings his Boston entourage to L.A., where he gets Johnny Drama an audition for his new film. Back in Boston, Paul must fend off screenwriters hoping he will pass their work to his brothers. He throws all scripts into a box, but learns Alma has been secretly reading them and sharing her thoughts with her Hollywood sons.

=== Season 2 (2014) ===
No. overall	No. in season	Title	Original release date	Prod. code	US viewers (millions)
10	1	"Here's the Drill"	August 13, 2014	12/204	2.04
Donnie asks Paul to join a fantasy football league. Paul seeks advice from Rob Gronkowski, who receives a cooking lesson in return. To help Drama's film career, Mark takes him to a Los Angeles dentist. Alma becomes addicted to apps when she purchases a smartphone.
11	2	"The Great Wahlberg of China"	August 20, 2014	17/209	1.49
In China. Mark takes Drama and Nacho with him to Hong Kong for a movie premiere. Drama is sent to audition for a local commercial. Nacho scouts for future Wahlburgers locations, while testing his "stomach of steel" with the local delicacies. Paul and Alma takes Drama tells about fortune teller.
12	3	"Pranks for the Memories"	August 27, 2014	14/206	1.46
With the annual Dorchester Day Parade coming up, pranks abound in the Wahlberg family. Alma's grandson Brandon tricks Kari into wearing a hamburger costume for a fake initiation ritual, Nacho and Johnny Drama botch the job of painting Donnie's shed, and Alma finds a way to get into the Dorchester Day parade.
13	4	"An American Wahlberg in London"	September 3, 2014	13/205	1.47
In London. During the New Kids on the Block's European tour, Donnie gets homesick so Jenny invites Paul to London. Paul attempts to get his brother to enjoy English cuisine, but ultimately cooks for the entire band.
14	5	"Meet the Press"	September 10, 2014	11/203	1.19
Paul's busy day includes visiting an oyster farm, an interview with a reporter, and a skateboarding event for his son. Mark then insists he meet a powerful city developer to discuss the Wahlburgers location near Fenway. When the visiting reporter becomes interested in Alma's Wahlberg childhood stories, Paul worries about how candid this profile may become.
15	6	"A Cut Above"	September 17, 2014	9/201	1.08
Donnie suggests Paul take up woodworking as a hobby to help manage his stress. Worried that Paul will hurt himself, Alma insists that her oldest son Arthur, a professional carpenter, try and protect Paul from any danger. Meanwhile, Mark lets Drama and his funk band perform at the Boston premiere of his new movie. A nervous Drama thinks his band may not be up to the task.
16	7	"Guarding Alma"	September 24, 2014	10/202	1.06
Mark notices that the restaurants are busy and asks his bodyguard Scott to go to Boston to look after Alma. Scott soon finds himself as Alma's new best friend. Meanwhile, pop duo MKTO visits Wahlburgers while on a tour stop, allowing Paul to give his daughter Madison the night of her life. Drama hustles himself an opportunity to perform some of his old music on stage with MKTO.
17	8	"Something's Fishy"	October 1, 2014	16/208	0.96
Paul and his brother Bob take their sons fishing for the day, but the leisurely outing turns into a wild paintball shootout between the two generations instead. Alma steps in to deal with the fact that Brandon is dating two girls at once.
18	9	"Trading Places"	October 8, 2014	19/211	1.22
An argument over whose job is tougher leads Donnie to challenge Paul to let him run the restaurant for the day. The work proves to be far more taxing than Donnie expected, and his experiments with new recipes do nothing to soothe Paul's anxiety. Meanwhile, Arthur offers Johnny Drama a co-starring role in an independent film.

=== Season 3 (2015) ===
No. overall	No. in season	Title	Original release date	Prod. code	US viewers (millions)
19	1	"Wedding Bliss and Big Papi Hits"	January 7, 2015	24/216	1.533
Paul and Kari takes Boston Red Sox player David Ortiz for his burger. Alma, Phyllis and Brandon was on the bus with their Donnie and Jenny's shower gift.
20	2	"The Weight Is Over"	January 14, 2015	20/212	1.382
Mark, Nacho, and Drama went to gym weight classic. They patched their hair. Donnie and Paul was in the same room at Alma's house.
21	3	"Should I Stay Orr Should I Go?"	January 21, 2015	21/213	1.734
Paul takes Bobby Orr went to their golfing skills. Nacho, Drama, and Kari was the nickname called "Special K". Donnie and Alma went to house hunting.
22	4	"Viva Paul Vegas"	January 28, 2015	23/215	1.546
Mark, Nacho, and Drama in the sporting area. Donnie and Paul went to Las Vegas for their casino.
23	5	"A Re-Markable Feast"	February 4, 2015	25/217	1.301
Alma, Phyllis, and Bob went to their restaurant, with their feast.
24	6	"Wahl Of Fame"	February 11, 2015	22/214	1.637
Kari dressed as superwoman with their warehouse purchases a dispenser. New Kids On The Block went to Hollywood Walk of Fame.
25	7	"On Your Mark...Ted Set... Home!"	February 18, 2015	18/210	1.085
Paul and Mark went to Los Angeles, with their played Ted 2. Mark was hanging with acting gig with Drama.
26	8	"Bowling For Burgers"	February 25, 2015	15/207	0.912
Alma, Paul, Brandon, and Kari went to bowling.
27	9	"Grand Opening Eh?"	March 4, 2015	26/218	1.240
Their grand opening was in Toronto, Canada. Elijah, Donnie, and Jenny visit Paul to their opening restaurant. Drama was the star in independent film.

=== Season 4 (2015) ===
No. overall	No. in season	Title	Original release date	Prod. code	US viewers (millions)
28	1	"License To Grill"	July 15, 2015	27/301	1.266
Paul and his kids visit Mark's family in Los Angeles for a barbecue and touch football. Meanwhile, back in Hingham, Kari learns that Alma once lived with Mark in L.A. and gets her to discuss life in Hollywood.
29	2	"Do The Hustle"	July 22, 2015	28/302	1.065
Mark searches for new ventures, and members of his entourage attempt to pitch their own ideas. Alma searches her closet for a dress to wear for an upcoming graduation. Her frustration leads to a shopping trip with her friend Phyllis.
30	3	"Krafting A Patriotic Burger"	July 29, 2015	33/307	1.261
Mark pledges to make a Super Bowl Burger for the New England Patriots' owner Robert Kraft. However, some members of the team have their own ideas about the type of burger.
31	4	"Good Vi-Bro-Tions"	August 5, 2015	30/304	1.529
An NKOTB concert in New York City brings the Wahlberg brothers together. Paul takes Alma out to Mother's Day event featuring celebrity mothers, which causes to reflect on her life.
32	5	"Drama Meets Drama"	August 12, 2015	34/308	1.309
The Entourage film premiere allows the real entourage to meet their onscreen portrayers. Brandon decides to throw Alma a surprise birthday party with Paul's help. Only she doesn't like surprises, and Paul helps her to pull her own prank.
33	6	"Not Your Routine Poutine"	August 19, 2015	31/305	1.518
Paul and Donnie must decide on Wahlburger's poutine, a Canadian dish made of French fries, cheese curds and gravy, for the Toronto restaurant. In L.A., Mark gets a visit from his older brother, Bob, who must help search for future Wahlburgers locations.
34	7	"New Kids on the Boardwalk"	August 26, 2015	32/306	0.895
With a few delays before the opening of the Coney Island Wahlburgers, Donnie, Mark and Paul celebrate all over the amusement park, battling each other on arcade games.
35	8	"Matchmaker Mark"	September 2, 2015	29/303	1.139
Mark must help "Big A" with a date, going so far as being his Cyrano de Bergerac. Meanwhile, Paul's kids must help him decide on the Burger of the Month.

=== Season 5 (2016) ===
No. overall	No. in season	Title	Original release date	Prod. code	US viewers (millions)
36	1	"Directing Drama"	March 9, 2016	35/501	0.780
Johnny Drama wants to take his music career to the next level. Mark suggests making a music video, which he will direct. The video, "Wahlburgers Rap Jingle", will be shot in New Orleans, where Mark is filming his latest movie. Mark enlists musician Sean Combs and director Peter Berg to help mentor Drama. However, Drama is uncomfortable with the alter ego, "Drama Boy", that Mark creates for him.
37	2	"Family & Faith"	March 16, 2016	39/505	0.788
Mark flies to Philadelphia to host "The Festival of Families" to honor Pope Francis. Meanwhile, Alma, Paul and Bob attend the annual Wahlberg family reunion, where Brandon gets his first chance to join in the family poker game.
38	3	"Brooklyn Bound Burgers"	March 16, 2016	41/507	0.759
Donnie promises to bring Wahlburgers to the Blue Bloods cast and crew. Unfortunately, Paul is in Costa Rica for a much-needed vacation. Alma employs Brandon to help Donnie, while Paul's family tries to help him to relax.
39	4	"Bahston Gahden Pahtay"	March 23, 2016	36/502	0.762
Whenever New Kids on the Block perform in their hometown of Boston, it is a family event. Donnie surprises Alma and the rest of the NKOTB parents with a party bus for the concert. Meanwhile, Paul must fly out to Los Angeles for a last-minute business meeting with a billionaire investor looking to open up Wahlburgers throughout the Middle East.
40	5	"Wahl Always Have Paris"	March 23, 2016	37/503	0.711
On a movie promotional tour, Mark invites Paul to Paris so they can sightsee as well as celebrate Mark's birthday. Mark also wants Paul to cook for him and his French actor friend Sa'id to prove that Paul is as good as any French chef.
41	6	"Nurse Alma"	March 30, 2016	38/504	0.699
Mark finally gets a prank pulled on him, when he plays golf against Bubba Watson. Meanwhile, Alma, Bob and Brandon visit the former hospital where Alma worked as a nurse and all the Wahlberg boys were born.
42	7	"The Fast and the Furious Paul"	March 30, 2016	40/506	0.666
Dale Earnhardt Jr. invites Mark to the New Hampshire 301 race. Mark has Paul and Bob deliver Wahlburgers to top NASCAR drivers Greg Biffle and Ricky Stenhouse Jr. Meanwhile, Brandon visits Donnie in Chicago to get a singing lesson to help start his entertainment career.
43	8	"The Fenway Way Back"	April 6, 2016	42/508-60	0.643
With the grand opening of the Fenway Wahlburgers location, new investor Bob challenges the local Boston rival "Tasty Burger" to a game of softball at Fenway Park. All the Wahlberg brothers participate. Alma volunteers to manage the team, but ultra-competitive Mark decides to run things instead, while Donnie runs late for the game, jeopardizing Team Wahlburgers.

=== Season 6 (2016) ===
No. overall	No. in season	Title	Original release date	Prod. code	US viewers (millions)
44	1	"Paul-itics"	July 6, 2016	44/602	0.944
Donnie puts a ballot box in Wahlburgers so customers can cast their opinion on Alma's favorite son. She tries to put a stop to it, when Donnie and Bob's campaigning gets out of control. At Pebble Beach, California, Mark and Bubba Watson team up to compete in the AT&T Pro Am. Mark recruits friends to help affect the gameplay of others, such as Justin Timberlake, Jason Day and Jim Harbaugh.
45	2	"No Ifs, Ands or Putts"	July 13, 2016	43/601	0.974
While in Orlando for the grand opening of the first Wahlburgers in Florida, Mark and Paul have a competitive game of miniature golf with Paul's kids. Paul must leave the game early, so Mark finds a way to declare a quick winner. Meanwhile back in Boston, Alma is cast in a local furniture store commercial and seeks advice from Donnie.
46	3	"Five Card Studs"	July 20, 2016	50/608	0.859
Donnie hosts a charity poker tournament for Mark's youth foundation and increases the ante when he gets Paul, Bob, and Jim to make a side bet on who will be the last Wahlberg remaining in the competition. At the same time, Mark lets Alma take his daughters Ella and Grace out for a girls' day of shopping and makeovers.
47	4	"Dorchester Daze"	July 27, 2016	51/609	0.815
After scouting the new Wahlburgers Dorchester location, Paul, Bob and Alma visit the house that she and some of the kids moved into after divorcing their father. Meanwhile, Brandon is inspired to create a Wahlburgers calendar for Alma featuring Donnie and the rest of the family.
48	5	"Mark's Ha-Bachi"	August 3, 2016	46/604	0.800
Mark brings his friend Sexy Kenny, an outspoken hibachi chef, to Hingham and forces Paul to hire him at Wahlburgers much to Paul's dismay. Across the street, Donnie teaches Alma how to bartend.
49	6	"Hollywood and Dine"	August 10, 2016	45/603	0.650
Mark flies Paul to Los Angeles to the new Wahlburgers location. While there, Paul cooks a special meal for Mark and his wife Rhea at the restaurant where they first met. Back in Hingham, Donnie invites Alma for an interview with Entertainment Tonight for Mother's Day.
50	7	"Donnie Draper"	August 17, 2016	49/607	0.798
Believing that Wahlburgers should start a print ad campaign, Donnie has Paul come to Chicago and meet with a top-level ad agency that has developed some of Donnie's ideas. Meanwhile in Las Vegas for a charity event, Mark checks on the progress of the Vegas Wahlburgers location.
51	8	"Wahlbowl"	August 24, 2016	47/605	0.787
Mark invites his brothers and their kids to the New England Patriots practice facility for a game of touch football in front of Patriots owner, Robert Kraft. Meanwhile, Donnie takes son Elijah, an avid drummer, to visit the Zildjian cymbal factory.

=== Season 7 (2016-17) ===
No. overall	No. in season	Title	Original release date	Prod. code	US viewers (millions)
52	1	"VR The World"	November 16, 2016	55/704	0.738
Donnie creates a virtual reality experience of the Hingham Wahlburgers to give customers a taste of the atmosphere. Elsewhere: Mark introduces Drama to an up and coming Boston rapper.
53	2	"Go Midwest Young Men"	November 16, 2016	58/707	0.612
Mark heads to Detroit to help a new location launch successfully and Donnie and Paul scout downtown Chicago for a new restaurant, but Donnie tricks Paul into teaching a cooking class. Later: Mark enlists Paul for manager training in Detroit.
54	3	"Wahl In The Family"	November 23, 2016	53/702	0.637
Donnie meets Bob and Oscar in Chicago as they visit colleges and tries to convince Oscar to go to school there. Also: Mark runs into Paul at the premiere of his film Deepwater Horizon at the Toronto International Film Festival.
55	4	"Take Me Out To The Paul Game"	November 30, 2016	52/701	0.647
Paul organizes a speed-eating contest at the Coney Island location while Donnie throws out the first pitch at a nearby minor league baseball game. Elsewhere: Bob's daughter looks into the family's heritage.
56	5	"Great Scotland!"	December 7, 2016	57/706	0.669
Mark and Paul visit Scotland and Paul caters a dinner for the Lords and Ladies of Hopetoun House so Mark can play golf at St. Andrews. Also: Bob tries to get a burger named after him.
57	6	"Wahlformers"	December 14, 2016	59/708	0.607
Mark films "Transformers 5" and tries to place Wahlburgers merchandise in certain scenes, but director Michael Bay intervenes. Also: Paul takes Alma to lunch at a fancy restaurant.
58	7	"Bend it Like Wahlberg"	December 21, 2016	56/705	0.739
Mark and Paul visit London and sample the other "football" while to scouting a possible location with Tottenham Hotspur.
59	8	"If the Horseshoe Fits"	December 28, 2016	48/606	0.831
Paul enters "Taste of the Derby" and his brothers tag along to bet on the Kentucky Derby. Also: Mark visits the Air Jordan headquarters to design a Wahlburgers shoe.
60	9	"Rick-Rolled"	January 4, 2017	54/703	0.713
Paul takes a tour of London with Rick Astley and Alma gives Donnie cooking tips.
61	10	"Thanxmas"	January 11, 2017	60/709	0.765
The holidays are celebrated as Mark and his kids visit Alma, but Donnie is unable to attend.

=== Season 8 (2017) ===
No. overall	No. in season	Title	Original release date	Prod. code	US viewers (millions)
62	1	"Houston, We Have a Paul-Blem"	August 9, 2017	65	0.56
Mark, Donnie and Paul all converge in Houston in hopes of another New England Patriots championship. While Mark and his kids take on NFL Pro Bowler Travis Kelce, Donnie convinces Paul to join him on Jenny's radio show.
63	2	"Fry Me To The Moon"	August 9, 2017	69	0.57
Donnie invites food critic and YouTube celebrity Daym Drops to Wahlburgers to help convince Paul to change up the french fries. Alma enlists Johnny Drama's help to teach her golf so she can spend more time with Mark.
64	3	"Getting Rich in Vegas"	August 16, 2017	62	0.53
Mark asks Alma to accompany him to the Boston premiere of Patriots Day. Paul visits the Las Vegas Wahlburgers, where new neighbor John Rich proposes a business partnership.
65	4	"Weiner Takes All"	August 16, 2017	66	0.55
Donnie's trip to the grand opening of the second Orlando Wahlburgers is diverted when Joey Fatone seeks his advice for a new hot dog restaurant, Fat One's. Back in Massachusetts, Paul asks a secret diner to test out the food and service at the Lynnfield Wahlburgers.
66	5	"Where's The Beef?"	August 23, 2017	68	0.54
Paul discovers a meatless patty that he wants to put on the menu and has Mark perform a taste test; Donnie asks Danny Wood to help convince the rest of the New Kids on the Block to showcase the restaurant's gear on their upcoming tour.
67	6	"Wahl Around The World"	August 23, 2017	61	0.63
With the chain on the verge of closing a deal to open hundreds of locations in the Asia-Pacific, Mark gives Paul the final say in testing the new partnership. Donnie, unable to make the event announcing the deal, prepares his video speech. Meanwhile, Alma learns she might be a grandmother again from an unlikely source.
68	7	"Has-Bros"	August 30, 2017	63	0.51
Mark embarks on a cross-country business trip that includes an opportunity to create the first Wahlburgers action figure. While Paul is traveling with Mark, Alma secretly hires her best friend as the newest Alma Nove hostess.
69	8	"Music City Mayhem"	August 30, 2017	64	0.62
In Nashville on tour with NKOTB, Donnie scouts a potential location with Joey McIntyre and NSYNC's Chris Kirkpatrick where they join up with John Rich. Donnie recruits Big & Rich to perform at the NKOTB concert. Back home, Paul helps a veteran from the Wounded Warrior Project recover his passion for cooking.
70	9	"Nice Day for a Wahl Wedding"	September 6, 2017	67	0.59
When the NKOTB World Tour stops in Philadelphia, Donnie visits the new Wahlburgers location with his son Elijah and his friends. He and Elijah commandeer the Wahlburgers food truck and drive it to the concert venue. In Boston, some loyal patrons ask Paul if they can have their wedding at Wahlburgers. Meanwhile in Los Angeles, Mark tries to close a business deal to bring Wahlburgers to new locations in the Midwest.
71	10	"Magic Mark"	September 6, 2017	71	0.61
When Mark attends the VIP party at the Las Vegas Wahlburgers, Paul enlists guests Penn & Teller to make the event magical. Meanwhile in Hingham, Donnie suggests that Alma cook a meal as a way of introducing herself to all the new Wahlburgers corporate employees.
72	11	"Jen and Juice"	September 13, 2017	73	0.76
Donnie helps Jenny with test marketing for her new vodka at the Vegas Wahlburgers. As a surprise, Donnie enlists Boyz II Men to test the flavors. In Rome, Mark gets a delicious surprise birthday present from his business partner while traveling in Italy.
73	12	"Alma's Gone Fishin'"	September 13, 2017	74	0.68
As Mark negotiates a deal to put Wahlburgers into Bass Pro locations, Alma works there as a greeter. Meanwhile, Paul offers his brother Arthur to babysit his newest nephew.
74	13	"Wahl in a Day's Work"	September 20, 2017	72	0.53
A look at a day in the lives of Mark and Paul, as Mark attends the grand opening of the Cleveland Wahlburgers and Paul deals with a health scare.
75	14	"Deliver Us from Alma"	September 20, 2017	70	0.51
Paul's idea for Wahlburgers delivery provides the perfect cover for Donnie and Jenny to distract Alma, while Mark and the rest of the family prepare her surprise 75th birthday party.

=== Season 9 (2018) ===
No. overall	No. in season	Title	Original release date	Prod. code	US viewers (millions)
76	1	"Meat in the Middle"	June 13, 2018	76	0.60
Mark, Donnie and Paul have plans for Wahlburgers' ever-expanding burger empire. Paul is working on getting the right equipment and their burger times down in order to step in the fast food market with their "Express Model", and Donnie risks a personal mission to open a Wahlburgers in his hometown of St. Charles, Illinois. Meanwhile, the brothers disagree on the packaging of their own brand of retail beef, a financial risk that puts increased pressure on the family.
77	2	"OFD: Originally From Dorchester"	June 20, 2018	77	0.47
The plan for global expansion continues as the Wahlbergs want to break ground on a new restaurant in Dorchester. Paul thinks the fast food model is ready for a test run there, but tensions peak when Donnie learns that Paul made an executive decision on the beef packaging without the others' input. Meanwhile, Alma resumes writing her memoir.
78	3	"Paul the Pitch Man"	June 27, 2018	78	0.40
Mark surprises Paul by selecting him to be the pitch man for a business partnership, Paul thinks that Mark is pushing the fast food model too fast. In an initiative to bring Wahlburgers into a healthier market, Mark, Donnie, and Paul begin promoting the newest menu item, The Impossible Burger. Meanwhile, Alma takes charge in her new role of foreman at the Wahlburgers Dorchester construction site.
79	4	"Wahlburgers Are Virtually Everywhere"	July 11, 2018	75	0.44
Mark is hosting an NBA All-Star Weekend party at their newest addition, Wahlburgers-Sunset. He auditions new technology that allows the brothers to virtually appear at any Wahlburgers location from anywhere in the world, connecting them even more with their fans and customers. At the same time, Jenny and Alma have a girl's night out while attending the signing for Jenny's mixed cocktail beverage, Blondies. Paul continues to tweak the Express Model to create the perfect four-minute burger.
80	5	"Reeling in the Big Fish"	July 18, 2018	79	0.43
Mark and Paul try to secure a deal to put Wahlburgers in Bass Pro Shops. Alma gets wildly creative in making a signature Mother's Day cupcake for the restaurants. When Donnie meets a Wahlburgers server who wants to be a musician, it reminds Donnie that he owes his career to someone else's generosity, and this is his chance to pay it forward.
81	6	"Pittsburger Meets Wahlburger"	July 25, 2018	81	0.44
The new Pittsburgh Wahlburgers faces a unique challenge where their sports team rivalries have put a dent in the restaurant's success. Paul and Donnie try to bridge the social gap by exploring the city's culture in hopes of infusing that flavor in to the store. Meanwhile, Mark opens a Wahlburgers inside an Atlantic City casino before joining his brothers at the Pittsburgh VIP event.
82	7	"Boardwalk Burger Empire"	August 1, 2018	82	0.49
A freak ice storm knocks the power out and threatens to derail the opening of the newest Wahlburgers in Taylor, Michigan. Paul gives the CVap Oven the true test on baseball season's opening day at the Fenway location. After many months of being closed, Donnie takes it upon himself to reopen the Coney Island Wahlburgers.
83	8	"Wahl of America"	August 8, 2018	83	0.41
Over 15,000 fans greet Mark, Donnie and Paul at the largest grand opening in Wahlburger's history inside the Mall of America. While there, the brothers discuss the future of Wahlburgers where Mark and Donnie try to convince Paul on expanding their product line, "Wahlburgers at Home".
84	9	"To Protect & Serve Good Food"	August 8, 2018	84	0.32
Mark strikes a deal that will put Wahlburgers on military bases both domestic and abroad. Meanwhile, Paul and Donnie debate over the need to freeze and ship their proprietary beef blend around the world. Also, Donnie learns about St. Charles's culture in order to gain its city council's approval to build his own Wahlburgers.

=== Season 10 (2019) ===
No. overall	No. in season	Title	Original release date	Prod. code	US viewers (millions)
85	1	"What It Do In Des Moines"	May 15, 2019	85	0.43
To honor a bet that he lost to Mark, former New York Yankee Alex Rodriguez works a shift at the Fenway Wahlburgers restaurant; Mark and Donnie plot to exponentially increase Paul's Instagram followers; Alma and Phyllis take an oil painting class.
86	2	"On The Road"	May 22, 2019	86	0.39
Paul and Johnny Drama drive the food truck to Mark's dealership in Columbus, Ohio, then return to Boston to tailgate at a New England Patriots game with former players Matt Light and Troy Brown. Alma and Bob meet with a medium and are visited by a spirit.
87	3	"Be A Good Sport"	May 29, 2019	88	0.52
88	4	"A Tale Of Two Sin Cities"	June 5, 2019	89	0.45
89	5	"Next-Gen Wahlbergs"	July 3, 2019	90	0.30
90	6	"Wahl'king Down Memory Lane?"	July 10, 2019	80	0.28
91	7	"Wahlbergs Home...Away From Home (Part 1)"	July 17, 2019	91	0.33
92	8	"Wahlbergs Home...Away From Home (Part 2)"	July 24, 2019	93	0.36
93	9	"Wahlburgers Award Show Clips Show"	July 31, 2019	87	N/A
94	10	"Sweating The Big Stuff"	July 31, 2019	92	0.32
95	11	"Wahlburgers Comes Home"	July 31, 2019	94	0.32
