= Mother Warriors =

Book by Jenny McCarthy

Mother Warriors: A Nation of Parents Healing Autism Against All Odds
- Author: Jenny McCarthy
- Language: English
- Publisher: Dutton Penguin
- Publication date: September 2008
- Publication place: United States
- Media type: Hardcover
- Pages: 304
- ISBN: 978-0-525-95069-1
- OCLC: 223800488
- Dewey Decimal: 618.92/8588200922 22
- LC Class: RJ506.A9 M4254 2008

Mother Warriors: A Nation of Parents Healing Autism Against All Odds is the fifth book published by New York Times bestselling author, activist and television personality Jenny McCarthy. Her previous book, Louder Than Words, reached #3 on the New York Times bestseller list, and has more than 200,000 hardcovers in print after five printings. Many of McCarthy's assertions within the book, such as that she cured her son's autism and the benefits of chelation are highly disputed within the medical and scientific community, as chelation therapy has been fatal in at least one instance. The foreword was written by her son's pediatrician, Jay Gordon.

== Summary ==
The book shares the personal stories of several families fighting autism. These stories focus on alternative autism therapies that they try to heal their children, as well as McCarthy's own reminiscing about her autistic child and her outspoken and contentious activism. The book includes the daughter of the founder of Autism Speaks, who claims to have changed her son's diet and improved his autism despite conspiratorial resistance from the organization, which, the book claims, until recently, rejected research into biomedical treatments; a mother who is claimed "healed" her son of his autism while taking on breast cancer; a father whose son was officially undiagnosed after allegedly undergoing treatment for a laundry list of debilitating autism symptoms and regressions; and a sixty-year-old woman who made attempts to fight to save her son (now thirty) in the 1980s, the book exclaims that she paved the way for the parents of today. The book also features a list of controversial autism resources and a directory of DAN! (Defeat Autism Now!) doctors who are sympathetic to the widely discredited hypothesis that autism is caused by mercury in vaccines.
