= Maggie Eats Healthier =

Book by Paul Kramer

- front cover showing the original title
- Author: Paul Kramer
- Original title: Maggie Goes on a Diet
- Illustrator: Mari Kuwayama
- Cover artist: Mari Kuwayama
- Language: English
- Subject: health nutrition body image self-esteem
- Genre: Fiction
- Publisher: Aloha Publishers
- Publication date: December 16, 2011 (under the title Maggie Goes on a Diet)
- Publication place: United States
- Pages: 44
- ISBN: 0-9819745-5-4
- OCLC: 600991929

Maggie Eats Healthier (originally titled Maggie Goes on a Diet) is a children's literary work by Paul Kramer that addresses weight management during childhood, with pre-teens as the target audience. As of 2015, the book is available in 19 libraries.

== Summary ==
The narrative centers on Maggie Magee, a 14-year-old girl who transitions from being obese to slender. At the outset, Maggie faces bullying due to her weight and compensates by consuming large amounts of bread and cheese to boost her mood. Over time, she realizes that her weight attracts teasing and decides to take control by shedding pounds. She adopts healthier eating habits, such as consuming fruits and oatmeal, and increases her physical activity. As a result, she loses weight, her former bullies become friends, and her social standing improves. She begins participating in sports, culminating in her becoming a star soccer player by the story's end.

== Controversy ==
The book has faced criticism for its depiction of weight loss aimed at young children, with some parents and critics arguing that it might inadvertently be damaging to the very audience it aims to support. Film director Darryl Roberts commented, "We must safeguard our children. Today's youth are seen as marketing targets, which is harming them. A 6-year-old reading about someone losing weight, gaining popularity, and having a better life is problematic." Some consumers have even boycotted the book on Amazon, citing concerns over its potentially harmful message.

Paul Kramer, the author, has defended his work, stating, "Maggie recognizes that children can be unkind and that she chooses to do something about it—by taking control of her health through exercise. She wants to look better, feel better, and avoid teasing." In 2011, the Los Angeles Times' Karen Kaplan described the book as a "sensible" approach to dieting, due to its promotion of eating healthful foods. In a 2012 discussion, pediatrician William Sears supported the book's message, appreciating Maggie's acknowledgment and responsibility regarding her weight issues.

== See also ==
- My Beautiful Mommy
- Childhood obesity
