= Fame at the Mansion =

- Date: Evening of the 54th Grammy Awards, February 12, 2012
- Location: Playboy Mansion
- Participants: Sean Combs; Hugh Hefner; Ryan Long, executive producer

Fame at the Mansion was an exclusive black tie event held February 12, 2012, at the Los Angeles Playboy Mansion on the evening of the 54th Grammy Awards. The event, hosted by Sean Combs, featured an honorary ceremony for Playboy's founding father Hugh Hefner and was a media heavy fundraiser for the Angelwish Foundation, which supports children and families with chronic illness. Hefner was honored as a Humanitarian of the Year by the Angelwish Foundation. Following the event, Diddy was featured on Jimmy Kimmel Live!, and was quoted as saying that it was the "best party he has ever thrown."

The event was produced by Hollywood fundraiser Ryan Long, who is well known for his involvement as executive producer for Fame and Philanthropy, a fundraising event that took place on the evening of the 86th Academy Awards. Fame at the Mansion was the first of Long's series of high-profile celebrity fundraisers and is regarded as the launching pad for his career in highly publicized events. Following the event, Long spearheaded Fame and Philanthropy which featured Academy Award winning director James Cameron as its inaugural keynote speaker, and guest appearances from Charlize Theron, Halle Berry, Ne-Yo and other celebrities.

== Notable Guests ==
Because of its close involvement with Hefner and the Playboy Mansion, Fame at the Mansion drew many well known public figures, including but not limited to the following:

- Craig Robinson
- Evan Ross
- Teyana Taylor
- Jenny McCarthy
- Pamela Anderson
- Paris Hilton
- Lisa D'Amato
