= Ashley Berggren =

American basketball player

Personal information
- Born: November 18, 1976 (age 49) Barrington, Illinois, U.S.
- Listed height: 5 ft 10 in (1.78 m)

Career information
- High school: Barrington (Barrington, Illinois)
- College: Illinois (1994–1998)
- Position: Guard

Career highlights
- Third-team All-American – AP (1998); Big Ten Player of the Year (1997); 3× First-team All-Big Ten (1996–1998)
- Stats at Basketball Reference

Ashley Berggren
Medal record

Women's football

Representing United States

IFAF World Women's Championships
Gold medal – first place	2013 Finland	Tournament

Ashley Berggren (born November 18, 1976) was part of the United States National Team that captured the gold medal at the 2013 IFAF Women's World Football Championships. Her club team is the Chicago Force of the Women's Football Alliance. Prior to her career in football, Berggren was a member of the Chicago Condors of the American Basketball League (ABL).

== Athletic career ==
=== Basketball ===
Having competed at Barrington High School, she would play collegiate basketball for the Illinois Fighting Illini women's basketball program. With Illinois, she helped the squad to its first-ever Big Ten Conference Title, while earning three straight All-Big Ten honors (1996 to 1998). Her 2,061 career points after fifteen years is still good enough for second all-time. She was also the first women's basketball player to have her jersey retired by Illinois.

Before she would join the ranks of professional women's football, Berggren was the second round pick of the Chicago Condors in the 1999 ABL Draft. She was one of five players on the roster that had connections to Chicago and was even immortalized on a trading card.

=== Illinois statistics ===
Legend
GP	Games played	GS	Games started	MPG	Minutes per game	RPG	Rebounds per game
APG	Assists per game	SPG	Steals per game	BPG	Blocks per game	PPG	Points per game
TO	Turnovers per game	FG%	Field-goal percentage	3P%	3-point field-goal percentage	FT%	Free-throw percentage
**Bold**	Career best	°	League leader

Year	Team	GP	GS	Points	PPG	RBS	RPG	FG%	3P%	FT%	APG	SPG	BPG
1994–95	Illinois	26	12	275	10.6	133	5.1	42.2%	25.9%	63.6%	1.5	1.2	0.2
1995–96	Illinois	28	28	**689**	**24.6**	**263**	**9.4**	49.2%	20.3%	**81.4%**	2.5	**2.0**	**0.2**
1996–97	Illinois	**32**	**32**	571	17.8	208	6.5	52.0%	29.2%	79.1%	**4.2**	1.9	0.2
1997–98	Illinois	30	27	554	18.5	175	5.8	**57.0%**	**35.7%**	71.6%	2.8	1.2	0.1
Career		116	99	2089	18	779	6.7	50.6%	25.0%	75.4%	2.8	1.6	0.2

=== Football ===
At the 2013 IFAF Women's Worlds, Berggren would log one touchdown in a contest versus Sweden, while ranking sixth on the US in receiving yards. In the gold medal game versus Canada, she would compile three receptions for 34 yards. Also in 2013, she would help the Force win their first-ever WFA national championship.

In the national championship versus the Dallas Diamonds (of which several Dallas players were her teammates with Team USA), Berggren would catch a 20-yard touchdown pass from Sami Grisafe to give the Force a 26–0 advantage at halftime.

Of note, she also had the opportunity to compete in the 2012 WFA National Championship game. Contested at Heinz Field in Pittsburgh, it was the first women's football game ever held in an NFL stadium.

== Coaching career ==
Berggren was a 2013 inductee into the Illinois Basketball Coaches Association Hall of Fame. Having served as the bench boss for the Schaumburg girls basketball coach for four seasons (leading them to back-to-back winning seasons), she did not return for the 2013–14 season as her teaching position was no longer available.

== Awards and honors ==
- Big Ten Women's Basketball Player of the Year (1997)
- NCAA Women's Basketball First-Team All-American (1997)
