= Wahlburgers (TV series) =

American reality television series (2014–2019)

- Genre: Reality television
- Starring: Paul Wahlberg; Mark Wahlberg; Donnie Wahlberg; Alma McPeck Wahlberg Conroy; Jenny McCarthy
- Country of origin: United States
- Original language: English
- No. of seasons: 10
- No. of episodes: 95 (list of episodes)

Production
- Running time: 21–42 minutes

Original release
- Network: A&E
- Release: January 22, 2014 – July 31, 2019

Related
- Donnie Loves Jenny

Wahlburgers is an American reality television series that aired from January 22, 2014, to July 31, 2019, on A&E. During its 10 seasons, Wahlburgers aired 95 episodes.

== Premise ==
Restaurant logo

The series is based on the casual dining burger restaurant and bar Wahlburgers, a chain of restaurants that started in the Greater Boston town of Hingham, Massachusetts, and the lives of the Wahlberg family. The Wahlburgers business is owned by chef Paul Wahlberg in partnership with two of his brothers, actor Mark and singer/actor Donnie.

== Main cast ==
- Mark Wahlberg, actor, producer, rapper
- Donnie Wahlberg, actor, producer, a member of New Kids on the Block
- Paul Wahlberg, chef, actor
- Alma Wahlberg, mother of Donnie, Mark, and Paul, actress; she died on April 18, 2021
- Brandon Wahlberg, nephew of Donnie, Mark, and Paul
- Bob Wahlberg, brother of Mark, Donnie and Paul
- Henry "Nacho" Laun, a childhood friend of the brothers
- Johnny "Drama" Alves, a childhood friend of the brothers and an aspiring actor, miscellaneous crew, and special effects
- Kari Burke, Paul's assistant and operations manager
- Billy Leonard, a childhood friend of Mark and an investor in the restaurant
- Jenny McCarthy, Donnie's wife and actress, producer, and writer
- Rhea Durham, Mark's wife and model and actress

== Episode overview ==
Season	Episodes	Originally released	
Season	Episodes	First released	Last released
1	9	January 22, 2014	March 19, 2014
2	9	August 13, 2014	October 8, 2014
3	9	January 7, 2015	March 4, 2015
4	8	July 15, 2015	September 2, 2015
5	8	March 9, 2016	April 6, 2016
6	8	July 6, 2016	August 24, 2016
7	10	November 16, 2016	January 11, 2017
8	14	August 9, 2017	September 20, 2017
9	9	June 13, 2018	August 8, 2018
10	11	May 15, 2019	July 31, 2019

== Reception ==
Allison Keene of The Hollywood Reporter said that "only a true and abiding love for the Wahlbergs will keep viewers interested." Brian Lowry of Variety said the show is "generally playful, but it is just empty calories". Mark A. Perigard of The Boston Herald gave the show a B−.

In 2014 and 2015, Wahlburgers received Emmy nominations for Outstanding Unstructured Reality Program.

== Spin-off ==
Donnie Loves Jenny is a reality television series based on the newlywed Donnie Wahlberg and Jenny McCarthy's relationship and premiered on January 7, 2015.

== Syndication ==
AXS TV acquired syndicated rights to the series, which began airing on February 27, 2022.
