= The Autism Community in Action =

Non-profit organization in the USA

- Abbreviation: TACA
- Founded: February 13, 2000; 26 years ago
- Founder: Lisa Ackerman
- Tax ID no.: 27-0048002
- Legal status: 501(c)(3) nonprofit organization
- Headquarters: Irvine, California, United States
- Leader: Glen Ackerman
- Volunteers: 498
- Website: www.tacanow.org
- Formerly called: Talk About Curing Autism (until February 2019)

The Autism Community in Action (TACA) (formerly known as Talk About Curing Autism) is a nonprofit organization founded in 2000 by Lisa Ackerman and based in Irvine, California. Focused on families with autistic members,, TACA had 41 chapters in the United States as of 2023.

TACA programming includes parent education and support through chapter meetings & coffee talks, education events, autism journey guides website & support hotline, community events, parent mentoring, national conferences in california and georgia, webinars, and online parent education.

TACA has been known to support unscientific views on autism treatment and conspiracy theories. Group founder Lisa Ackerman used to attribute autism to a wide range of causes, urging parents to get rid of flame-retardant clothing or mattresses and new carpeting. She advocated for vitamin shots and hyperbaric oxygen chamber treatments.

== History ==
The TACA began with 10 families in a living room in 2000.

In 2001, TACA established chapters in San Fernando Valley, CA.

In 2002, TACA sent out its first e-newsletter and launched the TACAnow.org website. TACA in Costa Mesa moved to a larger location due to the increasing number of parents attending meetings. The first version of the parent binder became available around this time. It is later renamed the Autism Journey Guide. TACA established two California chapters in the Inland Empire and South Bay. 200,000 of TACA’s “My Child Has Autism” cards are distributed for the first time.

In 2003, Coffee Talk is held at the Cosa Mesa Chapter for the first time.

In 2004, Lisa Ackerman became a full-time volunteer TACA executive director. TACA then established the Visalia and Santa Rosa Chapters. Grandma Sharon and Julie Ward were present at the first Recovered Kids Meeting. The first TACA picnic is held at Camp James in Irvine, CA.

In 2005, TACA’s first family and friends campaign raised $30,000. TACA established the 1st Adopt a Family holiday program.

In 2006, TACA’s first printed newsletter was distributed. Autism Journey Guide and DVD is released. TACA & Jack FM team up for Jack’s first show concert.

In 2007, the first TACA Leadership conference was held. TACA establishes the Los Angeles chapter. 1st Ante Up for Autism raises $370,000.

In 2008, the 2nd Annual Leadership Conference with 60 in attendance takes place. TACA goes nationwide with new chapters in California, Georgia, Hawaii, Illinois, Minnesota, North Dakota, Virginia, Washington and Wisconsin. TACA’s Live Chat is launched at TACAnow.org.

In 2014, TACA joined with six other anti-autism rights organizations to form the Autism Policy Reform Coalition, an umbrella organization dedicated to reverting the provisions of the Autism CARES Act of 2014 so they are the same as those of the Combating Autism Act of 2006.

In 2019, TACA changed their name's abbreviation from Talk About Curing Autism to The Autism Community in Action. This was in part to distance itself with its former reputation. "The Autism Community in Action expresses exactly who we are and what we do," said Lisa Ackerman, co-founder and Executive Director. "While we are changing our name, there will be no change to our programs or services which are provided to the autism community almost entirely at no charge."

More recently, TACA has released news publications to raise awareness to the rates of autism in America, citing a CDC study finding that 1:36 Americans fell within the autism spectrum.

== Relationship with the anti-vaccine movement ==
=== 2000s ===
Among other critics, David Gorski identified TACA as "a group that promotes the idea that vaccines cause autism, as well as advocates dubious 'biomedical' treatments to 'cure' autism".

TACA was one of the sponsor groups of the Green our Vaccines march in Washington, D.C., on June 4, 2008, along with Generation Rescue. Actress and noted anti-vaccine activist Jenny McCarthy and then-boyfriend Jim Carrey were prominently featured at the rally, along with several speakers making specific links between vaccines and autism.

=== 2010s ===
In 2010, when the medical journal The Lancet issued a full retraction of Andrew Wakefield's research paper linking vaccines and autism, Rebecca Estepp, speaking for TACA, insisted she still trusted Wakefield's research.

In 2015, the co-coordinator of TACA's Maryland chapter indicated that even though they question vaccines, her group was not a follower of McCarthy.

=== 2020s ===
TACA’s stance post-COVID-19 to vaccinations seems to hold a hands-off approach, and have distanced themselves from much of the medical advice they gave in the past. In their FAQ, it states: “TACA supports all families living with autism regardless of vaccine status. […] TACA encourages families to work with their doctor to make the best medical decisions for their families.”

== Board of directors ==
Lisa Ackerman – secretary/executive director
Carolyn Baker – development director
Glen Ackerman – president
Dan Carney – CFO
Keith Banning – director
Elizabeth McCoy – director
Robby Saggu – director
Erich Kreidler – director
Kim Yang-Uk – director
Inna Kassatkina Jones – director
Bill Oldbam – director
Celena Hallstead – director
Cheryl Foster – director

== See also ==
- Vaccine hesitancy
- Autism Speaks
