= The Jenny McCarthy Show (1997 TV series) =

Variety show on MTV

- Developed by: MTV
- Country of origin: United States
- No. of episodes: 19

Production
- Running time: 22 minutes

Original release
- Network: MTV
- Release: March 5 – July 30, 1997

The Jenny McCarthy Show is an American television variety show and sketch comedy series that starred Jenny McCarthy. It aired on MTV in 1997.

== Reception ==
The show was critically panned.
