= Joanne McCarthy (basketball) =

American basketball player (born 1974)

Personal information
- Born: October 26, 1974 (age 52) Orland Park, Illinois, U.S.
- Listed height: 5 ft 7 in (1.70 m)
- Listed weight: 130 lb (59 kg)

Career information
- High school: Mother McAuley Liberal Arts (Chicago, Illinois)
- College: UIC (1992–1997)
- ABL draft: 1998: 4th round, 41st overall pick
- Drafted by: Chicago Condors
- Position: Guard

Career history
- 1998: Chicago Condors

Career highlights
- MCC Player of the Year (1996); 2× First-team All-Horizon (1996, 1997); Mid-Con All-Newcomer team (1993); No. 21 retired by UIC
- Stats at Basketball Reference

Joanne McCarthy (born October 26, 1974) is an American former basketball player. She played college basketball for the University of Illinois Chicago before playing professionally for the Chicago Condors in the short lived American Basketball League. She is the UIC Flames women's basketball all-time leader in career points, career free throws made, career three-point shots made as well as single-season three-point shots made and was the first female Flames basketball player to have her number retired. McCarthy, sometimes known as JoJo, was the 1996 Midwestern Collegiate Conference (now Horizon League) Women's Basketball Player of the Year. She won an Illinois High School Association (IHSA) class AA championship in high school. She is the sister of Jenny McCarthy and cousin of Melissa McCarthy.

== Early life ==
McCarthy was born on October 26, 1974, in the village of Orland Park, Illinois, a suburb of Chicago. She is the third of four sisters: Lynette, Jenny and Amy. Her sister, Jenny, is an actress and former Playboy Playmate, and actress Melissa McCarthy is a cousin of the McCarthy sisters. The family has German, Irish, and Polish ancestry. Growing up she went to St. Turibius Elementary, and the family lived in a two-bedroom until they could afford to expand it with additional bedrooms. She had a Catholic upbringing on Chicago's South Side. Her parents, Dan and Linda McCarthy of Orland Park, encouraged all of their kids to be active in high school sports: Lynette ran track; Jenny played softball; and both Amy and Joanne chose basketball. The sisters did gymnastics and bowling as youths. Dan was a steel plant foreman, who sometimes juggled three jobs to send his children to private Catholic schools. Lisa worked out of the home as a beautician.

Joanne attended Mother McAuley Liberal Arts High School where she starred in basketball. Mother McAuley, which was the largest American all-girls school with 1,915 students during McCarthy's senior season, was a volleyball powerhouse. In 1989, the school made the IHSA Class AA final four in basketball with McCarthy. As a junior, she was a member of the Mother McAuley 1991 girls Class AA state championship team. She was a teammate with her sister Amy at Mother McAuley.

== Basketball career ==
=== College ===
McCarthy played for UIC from 1992 to 1997. As a freshman she was a Summit League 1993 All-Newcomer Team selection. She was a two-time First-Team All-Midwestern Collegiate Conference (MCC, now Horizon League) selection and 1996 MCC Player of the Year. For the 1996–97 season she was the preseason MCC Player of the Year selection. During her career at UIC, she played with her younger sister, Amy. She and Amy formed the starting backcourt in Joanne's final season. In some statistics, they were first and second on the team. While at UIC, she majored in psychology.

She had set several records for the University of Illinois-Chicago including career scoring (1,805 points), career assists (430) and career Three-point field goal percentage (.385) by the time her career ended in 1997. In 2001, her number 21 jersey was retired by UIC, the schools first such honor for a female basketball player. She surpassed Penny Armstrong's career point total of 1,657. With over 70 consecutive starts, she also set the school's iron woman record. Other school records that McCarthy retired with include career three-point field goals made (238), career free throws made (463), single-season three point shots made (76), career free throw percentage (81.4%), career games played (115), career games started (111), and single-season games played/started (31). As of 2023, McCarthy continues to hold the school records for career points, career free throws made, career three-point field goals made, and single-season three-point field goals made. Her 5th-year senior season 142–169 (84.0%) free throw shooting percentage performance, led the MCC. There were press announcements well in advance when Jenny was going to attend one of her games.

During McCarthy's time at UIC, the team had mediocre results: with a cumulative record of 67–74 (40–40 in conference play) and finishes of 5th, 5th, 3rd, 4th and 6th. The team failed to make the NCAA Division I women's basketball tournament or the finals of the Horizon League women's basketball tournament during her time at the school.

=== Professional ===
Following graduation in 1997, McCarthy had unsuccessful tryouts in the WNBA. Then, she spent a year as a basketball operations intern for the Flames' basketball team. She was later drafted with the first pick of the fifth round of the 1998 American Basketball League draft by the Chicago Condors. McCarthy was a late addition to the Condors opening night inaugural roster when Katrina McClain decided that she would not join the Condors team that she had been assigned to following the disbanding of the Atlanta Glory. Joining the Condors meant McCarthy could play professionally in the same home arena (UIC Pavilion, now known as the Credit Union 1 Arena) that she did in college. During the 1998–99 season, she played in six games for the Condors, where she was coached by Jim Cleamons. Initially, she had joined the team as a "salaried replacement player if anyone is injured". When the league folded, she tried out for the Los Angeles Sparks and Utah Starzz. Following basketball, McCarthy moved to Los Angeles and became a makeup artist.

== Statistics ==
=== College statistics ===
Ratios
Year	Team	GP	FG%	3P%	FT%	RBG	APG	BPG	SPG	PPG
1992–93	UIC	25	38.0%	38.6%	81.5%	3.92	3.16	0.12	1.88	11.44
1993–94	UIC	5	37.8%	34.6%	85.7%	1.80	1.40	0.00	2.00	13.40
1994–95	UIC	27	42.1%	41.0%	72.1%	4.93	3.04	0.30	1.81	14.56
1995–96	UIC	31	44.4%	41.1%	82.7%	4.35	4.10	0.16	2.32	18.13
1996–97	UIC	27	36.1%	33.5%	84.0%	6.70	5.00	0.15	2.85	18.41
Career		115	40.2%	38.5%	81.4%	4.83	3.74	0.17	2.22	15.70

Totals
Year	Team	GP	FG	FGA	3P	3PA	FT	FTA	REB	A	BK	ST	PTS
1992-93	UIC	25	79	208	27	70	101	124	98	79	3	47	286
1993-94	UIC	5	17	45	9	26	24	28	9	7	0	10	67
1994-95	UIC	27	130	309	71	173	62	86	133	82	8	49	393
1996-97	UIC	27	150	416	55	164	142	169	181	135	4	77	497
Career		115	552	1374	238	618	463	569	556	430	20	255	1805
