= Alternative vaccination schedule =

Vaccine schedule different from that which is officially recommended

In the United States, an alternative vaccination schedule is a vaccination schedule differing from the schedule endorsed by the Advisory Committee on Immunization Practices (ACIP). These schedules may be either written or ad hoc, and have not been tested for their safety or efficacy. Proponents of such schedules aim to reduce the risk of adverse effects they believe to be caused by vaccine components, such as "immune system overload" that is argued to be caused by exposure to multiple antigens. Parents who adopt these schedules tend to do so because they are concerned about the potential risks of vaccination, rather than because they are unaware of the significance of vaccination's benefits. Delayed vaccination schedules have been shown to lead to an increase in breakthrough infections without any benefit in lower side effect profiles.

== Effects ==
Contrary to the claims made by some advocates of alternative vaccine schedules, there is no scientific evidence for the existence of "immune system overload", and according to the UK National Health Service the idea is a "myth". In addition, the amount of chemicals in vaccines such as aluminium and formaldehyde is much lower than natural exposure levels. Intentional deviation from the ACIP's schedule leaves children vulnerable to infection and increases the likelihood of outbreaks of vaccine-preventable diseases. These schedules also increase the chances of infection among individuals who could not be vaccinated for medical reasons, because they were too young, or who did not develop a sufficient immunologic response to the vaccine.

After one of the most notorious outbreaks of measles in the United States, in California, legislation was passed to make vaccination mandatory, as alternative vaccine scheduling and/or avoidance had been prevalent before the outbreak.

== Popularity ==
An increasing number of children are undervaccinated, of whom an estimated 13% or more are believed to be so because of parental choice. One survey, published in Vaccine, found that 9.4% of parents in King County, Washington used an alternative vaccine schedule, while another survey found that more than 1 out of 10 parents of children aged between 6 months and 6 years used an alternative vaccine schedule. In a 2011 survey of Washington State pediatricians, 77% of them reported that their patients "sometimes or frequently" asked for alternative vaccination schedules. The same survey found that 61% of pediatricians were comfortable with using such a schedule if a parent asked for it. A 2012 survey found that the percentage of shot-limiting children—defined as children who received no more than two vaccines per visit between their birth and the age of nine months—had increased from 2.5% to 9.5% in Portland, Oregon. Research on well-off American families suggests that even parents who are ostensibly pro-vaccine can be misled by disinformation, and this can lead them to delay having their children vaccinated, and to tolerate such delay in others.

== Proponents ==
Among the most prominent proponents of alternative vaccination schedules is notable pediatrician and vaccine critic Robert Sears. Sears has been criticized by vaccine expert Paul Offit for what Offit states is Sears' "misrepresentation of vaccine science." Offit argues that Sears' alternative vaccination schedules present a public health risk, in that Sear's alternative vaccination schedules require a larger number of visits to the doctors office for parents - and unvaccinated children can acquire transmissible diseases while waiting in doctors offices'. Furthermore, increasing the time before a child receives a vaccine will increase the time in which that child is vulnerable to contracting preventable diseases. Additionally, spreading out vaccination shots does not decrease a child's pain or anxiety related to the shot: in fact, increasing a child's total amount of doctor visits for vaccination shots (by insisting upon a single shot per visit) may increase that child's needle phobia, according to Dr. Offit. Overall, Sears' alternative vaccination schedules are likely to decrease immunization rates by reducing vaccine timeliness. Notably, Sears has responded to Offit's critique by conceding many of his original positions - in other words, Sears has since stated that he is in favour of the conventional vaccine schedule, and that many of his original positions (e.g., that thimerosal causes autism) are not supported by evidence. Likewise, the American Academy of Pediatricians has stated that no alternative vaccine schedules have been found to provide better safety or efficacy than the recommended vaccination schedule.

In June 2018, the Medical Board of California placed Sears on probation for improperly granting a medical exemption from all future vaccines to a two-year-old child without obtaining any of the child's medical records, including which vaccines the child had received to date.

== Types of schedules ==
A 2016 study identified five different types of alternative vaccine schedules: Sears' schedule, a shot-limiting schedule, selective delaying or refusal, making vaccine decisions visit-by-visit, or refusing all vaccines. Regardless of the type of alternative schedule used, skipping or delaying recommended vaccines has been shown to result in an increased risk of contracting and spreading vaccine-preventable diseases.

== See also ==
- MMR vaccine and autism
- Vaccine hesitancy
