= Donnie Loves Jenny =

American reality television series

- Genre: Reality television
- Starring: Donnie Wahlberg; Jenny McCarthy
- Opening theme: "This Is Our Theme Song"
- Country of origin: United States
- Original language: English
- No. of seasons: 3
- No. of episodes: 26

Production
- Executive producers: Rasha Drachkovitch; Lily Neumeyer; Devon Graham; Donnie Wahlberg; Jenny McCarthy
- Camera setup: Multiple
- Running time: 22 minutes
- Production companies: 44 Blue Productions; D&J Productions

Original release
- Network: A&E
- Release: January 7, 2015 – April 13, 2016

Related
- Wahlburgers

Donnie Loves Jenny is an American reality television series which premiered on January 7, 2015, on the A&E cable network. Announced in November 2014, the series chronicles the lives of Donnie Wahlberg and Jenny McCarthy as newlyweds. The series premiered with a one-hour wedding episode.

The show is co-produced by D&J Productions, a production company launched by Wahlberg and McCarthy. Both of them have previously appeared on Wahlburgers, another reality series which airs on the same network. "We’re thrilled to join Donnie and Jenny as they begin the next chapter of their lives," said David McKillop, Executive Vice President of the network. "Viewers have enjoyed following their relationship on ‘Wahlburgers’ and we look forward to sharing this next part of their journey," he also added.

== Episodes ==
Season	Episodes	Originally released	
Season	Episodes	First released	Last released
1	10	January 7, 2015	March 11, 2015
2	7	July 15, 2015	September 2, 2015
3	9	March 16, 2016	April 13, 2016

=== Season 1 (2015) ===
No. overall	No. in season	Title	Original release date	Prod. code	US viewers (millions)
1	1	"The Wedding"	January 7, 2015	01/101-60	1.363
2	2	"Domesticated"	January 14, 2015	02/102	1.168
3	3	"Looking For Love In All The Wrong Faces"	January 21, 2015	03/103	1.439
4	4	"All About The Bass"	January 28, 2015	04/104	1.205
5	5	"Bumps In The Night"	February 4, 2015	05/105	1.057
6	6	"Road Trip Interuptus"	February 11, 2015	06/106	1.199
7	7	"Bride and Groom Unpack The Room"	February 18, 2015	07/107	1.002
8	8	"To Baby or Not to Baby"	February 25, 2015	08/108	0.873
9	9	"The Grand Booty Fest Hotel"	March 4, 2015	09/109	1.002
10	10	"Sweet Home Chicago"	March 11, 2015	10/110	0.887

=== Season 2 (2015) ===
No. overall	No. in season	Title	Original release date	Prod. code	US viewers (millions)
11	1	"Goodbye NY"	July 15, 2015	12/202	1.053
12	2	"Surprise, Surprise"	July 22, 2015	13/203	0.853
13	3	"I'll Be There"	July 29, 2015	14/204	0.911
14	4	"Back To Your Roots"	August 5, 2015	15/205	1.207
15	5	"Macky's Big Adventure"	August 12, 2015	16/206	0.975
16	6	"Blending Families"	August 26, 2015	18/208	0.643
17	7	"Birthday Blues"	September 2, 2015	17/207	0.957

=== Season 3 (2016) ===
No. overall	No. in season	Title	Original release date	Prod. code	US viewers (millions)
18	1	"Ride It Out"	March 16, 2016	20/302	0.685
19	2	"Birthday Cruise"	March 16, 2016	19/301	0.644
20	3	"Lookie Loos"	March 23, 2016	22/304	0.657
21	4	"Going Once, Going Twice"	March 23, 2016	21/303	0.581
22	5	"Hometown Hero"	March 30, 2016	23/305	0.570
23	6	"Denny Does Dallas"	March 30, 2016	24/306	0.489
24	7	"Fort Wahlberg"	April 6, 2016	25/307	0.574
25	8	"McCarthy Madness"	April 6, 2016	11/201	0.524
26	9	"R.I.P Youth"	April 13, 2016	26/308	0.609
