= The Jenny McCarthy Show (2013 talk show) =

- Genre: Talk show
- Directed by: Liliana Olszewski
- Starring: Jenny McCarthy
- Country of origin: United States
- Original language: English
- No. of seasons: 1
- No. of episodes: 15

Production
- Executive producers: Jeff Olde; Jenny McCarthy; Karla Hidalgo; Michael Davies; Shelly Tatro
- Running time: 20 to 23 minutes
- Production companies: Jenny McCarthy Productions; Embassy Row; Sony Pictures Television

Original release
- Network: VH1
- Release: February 8 – May 24, 2013

The Jenny McCarthy Show is an American pop culture-based talk show television program that aired on VH1. The series was hosted by Jenny McCarthy and premiered on February 8, 2013. VH1 added seven episodes to the series' original eight-episode first season. Due to McCarthy joining The View, The Jenny McCarthy Show did not produce additional episodes beyond this.

== Format ==
Filmed in New York City, The Jenny McCarthy Show features different celebrity guests along with trivia, games and discussion about recent pop culture news. Originally, Michelle Buteau from VH1's Best Week Ever delivered pop culture news via Skype, but she eventually joined as a co-host and appeared with guests in the studio. From the start, there was to be a different guest DJ and bartender but that plan has also seemingly fallen through.

== Episodes ==
No.	Guests	Guest DJ	Original release date	U.S. viewers (millions)
1	"JoJo McCarthy, Joseline Hernandez and Jesse Heiman"	Sam French	February 8, 2013	0.20
2	"Eve and Patti Stanger"	Sam French	February 15, 2013	0.20
3	"Renee Graziano and Michelle Collins"	Sam French	February 22, 2013	0.13
4	"Carson Kressley and Adrienne Bailon"	Sam French	March 1, 2013	0.35
5	"Drita D'Avanzo and French Montana"	Manufactured Superstars	March 8, 2013	0.12
6	"Nicole "Snooki" Polizzi and Jenni "JWoww" Farley"	Sam French	March 15, 2013	0.19
7	"Carrie Keagan and Michelle Buteau"	N/A	March 22, 2013	0.18
Note: Steve Santagati also made an appearance in this episode.
8	"JoJo McCarthy and Donnie Wahlberg"	N/A	March 29, 2013	0.14
9	"Ronnie Ortiz-Magro and Michelle Buteau"	N/A	April 12, 2013	0.17
Note: Celebrity psychic Thomas John also makes an appearance in this episode.
10	"Ciara and Michelle Buteau"	N/A	April 19, 2013	0.14
11	"Brande Roderick, Terry Dubrow and Michelle Buteau"	N/A	April 26, 2013	0.14
12	"Kandi Burruss and Michelle Buteau"	N/A	May 3, 2013	0.12
13	"Nelly and Michelle Buteau"	N/A	May 10, 2013	0.16
14	"Lil Jon and Michelle Buteau"	N/A	May 17, 2013	0.17
15	"Jacqueline Laurita and Michelle Buteau"	N/A	May 24, 2013	0.17
