= Chicago Condors =

American women's professional basketball team

- Founded: 1998
- League: American Basketball League
- Team history: 1998–1998
- Based in: Chicago, Illinois
- Arena: University of Illinois-Chicago Pavilion
- Championships: none

The Chicago Condors were a very short-lived member of the American Basketball League (ABL). Their hometown was much larger than usual for the ABL, which mainly targeted mid-market cities, and initial team merchandising was successful. The team appeared to have a solid base. General manager Allison Hodges was the wife of former Chicago Bulls star Craig Hodges, and former Bulls assistant Jim Cleamons was head coach.

In the ABL expansion draft leading up to the team's first season, the Condors selected Tausha Mills, Ashley Berggren, Ryneldi Becenti, Cathy Boswell, E.C. Hill, Anita Kaplan and Dana Wilkerson. They later added Joanne McCarthy and Beverly Williams to the roster.

The team's existence almost ended before it began. According to Hodges, she was about to announce the team's name when she got a call that the ABL was about to fold. Minutes later, she got another call saying that the season was back on. Only 12 games into their first season, the team was forced to disband when, on December 22, 1998, the ABL suddenly went bankrupt and folded, though Hodges told The New York Times that she believed the league was on its last legs before then.

== Team Record ==
Season	W	L	Win %	Result
1998	4	8	.333	3rd Place, Eastern Conference
