= Generation Rescue =

Anti-vaccination organization (2005–2019)

Generation Rescue Inc.
- Founded: May 13, 2005
- Founders: Lisa Handley; J.B. Handley
- Dissolved: December 31, 2019
- Tax ID no.: 20-2063267
- Legal status: Defunct (formerly 501(c)(3) nonprofit organization)
- Headquarters: Los Angeles, California, United States
- President, Director: Jenny McCarthy
- Directors: Jonathan B. Handley; Lisa Handley; Katie Wright; Rowena Salas; Donald Wahlberg
- Executive Director: P. Zack Gonzalez
- Revenue: $358,350 (2019)
- Expenses: $357,241 (2019)
- Employees: 3 (2019)
- Volunteers: 1,594 (2019)

Generation Rescue was an American nonprofit organization that advocated the scientifically disproven view that autism is primarily caused by environmental factors, particularly vaccines. The organization was established in 2005 by Lisa and J.B. Handley. Subsequently, Generation Rescue became known as a platform for Jenny McCarthy's autism-related anti-vaccine activism. The organization officially ceased operations in December 2019.

== Media campaign ==
The organization was established in 2005 by Lisa and J.B. Handley and 150 volunteer "Rescue Angels". More recently, it was led by Jenny McCarthy, an author, television personality and former Playboy model. Since McCarthy became president, the organization was rebranded variously as "Jenny McCarthy and Jim Carrey's Autism Organization", "Jenny McCarthy's Generation Rescue" and "Jenny McCarthy's Autism Organization". Bonnie Rochman wrote in Time, "...McCarthy's celebrity status has meant that her affiliation with Generation Rescue, an organization that links autism with immunization, has spooked thousands of parents, encouraging them to reject vaccines for their children — the same vaccines that are responsible for saving lives around the world."

== Causes of autism ==
Generation Rescue proposed a number of possible causes for developmental-related issues, such as vaccines, the increase in the number of vaccines administered, and thiomersal, a mercury-based vaccine preservative. Generation Rescue claimed that biomedical intervention could help children recover. The hypotheses that vaccines, such as MMR, or thiomersal cause autism have been refuted by scientific research, as have claims that diets, drugs or chelation can cure autism. Because of Generation Rescue's public profile through national advertising, lack of medical evidence and because its point of view was not shared by the mainstream medical community, its message was controversial, and the organization has been described as anti-vaccine.

== Promotion of products sold by board members ==
Several products and treatments recommended by Generation Rescue to their members were sold by members of their board of directors or their medical advisory board. A $20,000 hyperbaric chamber sold by a firm whose president was then-board member Samir Patel was promoted by the group. Generation Rescue also encouraged its members to seek hyperbaric treatments from Dan Rossignol, who was a member of their science advisory board. Another member of that board, Anjum Usman Singh, also offered such treatments and received a reprimand by the medical board of the California Department of Consumer Affairs for failing to disclose she held a financial interest in the company selling the chambers she used with her patients.

Generation Rescue recommended lollipops enriched with vitamins sold by a company co-founded by Stan Kurtz and owned by Candace McDonald, who respectively served as president and executive director of Generation Rescue. For a time, the lollipops were sold directly through the group's website. A $2,000 foot bath that was promoted by Generation Rescue was sold by a sponsor of the group who contributed a minimum of $25,000 to its operating budget.

None of these featured products were recognized by the medical community as effective treatments related to autism. Until March, 2019, the organization also offered grants to some families, with which they would buy products offered by companies sponsoring Generation Rescue.

== Failed clinic ==
On June 19, 2017, Generation Rescue held a fundraising event in St. Charles, Illinois with Jenny McCarthy and husband Donnie Wahlberg, with part of the proceeds to be put aside for the construction of an integrative health clinic. Construction of the clinic begun in July, under a company managed by Candace McDonald, who was then executive director of Generation Rescue. Jenny McCarthy herself was on hand for the ground-breaking ceremony. The clinic was to open in January, 2018.

Construction was stopped in 2017 and the construction contractor filed a lawsuit for non-payment of invoices amounting to $500,000. Generation Rescue denied it had any links to the construction of the clinic. However, Generation Rescue, Candace McDonald and Jenny McCarthy were named in the suit as respondents in discovery. The lawsuit was settled; while the terms of the settlement were confidential, title to the site of the proposed clinic was relinquished to the contractor, who had intended to redraw the building's floor plans and finish individual suites. The property was subsequently developed as Fiore Salon Suites.

== Reception ==
Generation Rescue previously co-sponsored an annual conference in Chicago along with another controversial charity, Autism One. The choice of speakers at these conferences led critics to accuse both organizations of promoting unproven therapies, such as the Miracle Mineral Solution, as a purported cure for autism. These conferences have also been criticized because Andrew Wakefield has spoken at them. They have also been criticized because many of the speakers presenting "so-called treatments" have a financial interest in them.

J.B. Handley said of Andrew Wakefield, originator of the claim that the MMR vaccine causes autism: "To our community, Andrew Wakefield is Nelson Mandela and Jesus Christ rolled up into one. He's a symbol of how all of us feel." However, Wakefield's work has been characterized as "an elaborate fraud", and parental fears over vaccines sparked by the controversy, and by continued advocacy of the disproven theory by groups such as Generation Rescue despite, have led, in turn, to decreased immunization rates and an increased incidence of whooping cough and measles, a highly contagious and sometimes deadly disease.

Generation Rescue issued a statement that the "media circus" following the revelation of Wakefield's fraud and manipulation of data was "much ado about nothing". Salon responded to Generation Rescue's statement with:

But any organization using a celebrity to mislead parents with claims of "new" data that rely on decade-old vaccine formulas and schedules is more than disingenuous, it's flat-out dangerous.

— Mary Elizabeth Williams

Much of Generation Rescue's case was based on publications that did not go through a proper peer review process. Writing for Forbes, Emily Willingham characterized Generation Rescue as "an organization devoted to the debunked notion that vaccines cause autism and that autistic people can be 'recovered' from their autism by way of various unproven and sometimes dangerous interventions, including chelation."

== See also ==
- Outline of autism
- List of vaccine topics
