= Jay Gordon (physician) =

American physician (born 1948)

- Born: Jay N. Gordon; 1948 (age 77–78)
- Known for: Vaccine hesitancy
- Medical career
- Profession: Doctor
- Field: Pediatrics
- Website: drjaygordon.com

Jay N. Gordon (born 1948) is an American pediatrician, lecturer, and author. He is well-known within the anti-vaccine movement for his promotion of vaccine hesitancy. He does encourage vaccinating but at the discretion of the parent. He is also a long-time advocate of breastfeeding; he became a member of the International Health Advisory Council of the La Leche League in 2005.

Gordon's patients have included Eliza Jane Scovill (a 3-year-old who died of untreated HIV and AIDS), the son of actress and anti-vaccine activist Jenny McCarthy, and the children of actress Mayim Bialik.

== Views on vaccination ==
Gordon claims that, to an individual child, the risks of vaccination often outweigh its benefits. Therefore, he stopped following the recommended vaccine schedule for his patients in 1980, although he still administers vaccinations to some children on a case-by-case basis. Gordon has cited the debunked connection between vaccines and autism among the alleged risks to children that prevent him from routinely administering vaccinations. He has signed hundreds of personal-belief exemptions to school vaccine requirements.

In a 2015 interview with Ben Tracy of CBS News, Gordon was asked about the risk of contagion should someone with measles walk into his office, given that most of his patients delay or avoid the measles vaccine. Gordon responded: "You just said it, they'd get measles. Not meningitis, not the plague, not Ebola, they'd get measles. Measles is almost an [sic] always a benign childhood illness." However, Deborah Lehman at Cedars Sinai Medical Center says: "People don't remember children staying in dark rooms because they have measles and the light hurts their eyes and developing brain swelling and serious developmental problems, we've given people a false sense of security and it's situations like this, outbreaks like this [Disneyland measles outbreak] that really remind us of the importance of these diseases and really the benefit of vaccine [sic]."

As of 2021, Dr. Gordon supports the COVID vaccine for eligible children and adults. “Vaccine immunity is better than disease immunity. “

== Selected works ==
Gordon is the author and co-author of several books and a DVD, including:

- Brighter Baby (1999)
- Listening to Your Baby: A New Approach to Parenting Your Newborn (2002)
- Good Nights: The Happy Parents' Guide to the Family Bed, and a Peaceful Night's Sleep! (2002)
- The ADD and ADHD Cure: The Natural Way to Treat Hyperactivity and Refocus Your Child (2008)
- Vaccinations? Assessing the Risks and Benefits (DVD) (2008)
- Preventing Autism: What You Can Do to Protect Your Children Before and After Birth (2013)
