= William Sears (physician) =

American pediatrician and author

- Born: William Penton Sears; December 9, 1939 (age 86); Alton, Illinois
- Other name: Dr. Bill
- Education: Saint Louis University
- Occupations: Pediatrician and author
- Known for: Promoting attachment parenting
- Notable work: The Baby Book
- Spouse: Martha
- Children: 8, including Robert Sears

William Penton Sears (born December 9, 1939), also referred to as Dr. Bill, is an American pediatrician and the author or co-author of parenting books. Sears is a celebrity doctor and has been a guest on various television talk shows.

Sears is a proponent of the attachment parenting philosophy and is most well known for authoring The Baby Book, which popularized that style of parenting. He advocates practices such as breastfeeding, co-sleeping, and babywearing. His parenting advice has been influential but has also faced criticism for being demanding and has been described by some as a fad.

== Early life ==
William Sears was born in Alton, Illinois, the son of Lucille and Willard Sears, an engineer. William's father left when he was one month old, after which Lucille moved back in with her parents. His mother raised him as a Catholic, which influenced his later career path and parental theories. After graduating high school, he studied to become a priest at University of St. Mary of the Lake/Mundelein Seminary but dropped out due to his desire to raise a family.

After graduating from Saint Louis University in 1962, he enrolled in medical school and began teaching biology at a Catholic school. While studying medicine, he met his wife Martha, who at the time was a nurse at the university. The couple had a total of eight children, one of whom has Down syndrome. Sears cited his experience as a father as inspiration for many of his theories regarding parenting and infant development.

== Career ==
Sears began writing while working as a small-town pediatrician. In 1982, William and Martha published their first book on parenting, although this was later overshadowed by William's The Baby Book in 1993. The book makes many claims about the importance of attachment parenting, and advocates for breastfeeding and babywearing into toddlerhood. According to Sears, he concluded that babywearing was essential to promoting a healthy bond between mothers and infants after interviewing two women from Zambia at an international parenting conference. Sears later said that he developed many of his ideas after reading Jean Liedloff's 1975 book The Continuum Concept, which claimed that children raised among the indigenous peoples of South America were more well behaved than their Western counterparts due to being carried constantly during infancy.

After the success of the Baby Book, Sears was compared to a pediatrician Benjamin Spock. Sears' advocacy of co-sleeping put him at odds with Richard Ferber who advised parents to let their children self-soothe by crying themselves to sleep. Both authors ended up taking more moderate stances in a 2006 Day to Day episode revisiting the dispute, where they conceded that different approaches worked for different parents.

Sears completed medical residencies at Children's Hospital Boston and the Hospital for Sick Children in Toronto. In 2004, he was an Associate Clinical Professor of Pediatrics at the University of California, Irvine.

He is a medical and parenting consultant for BabyTalk and Parenting magazines and the pediatrician on the website Parenting.com. Sears has been a guest on various television shows including: 20/20, Donahue, Good Morning America, Oprah Winfrey, CBS This Morning, CNN, Today Show and Dateline.

Sears and his family members are distributors and spokespersons for Juice Plus dietary supplements, which Sears promotes on his website. National Safety Associates (NSA), the company that markets Juice Plus, used testimonials from Bill Sears in advertisements promoting Juice Plus Gummies. In April 2005, the Better Business Bureau's National Advertising Division deemed that the ads misleadingly implied "that the Gummies are low in sugar and are a nutritional alternative to fruits and vegetables". As a result, NSA "promised to modify its ads" and stop calling Gummies "the next best thing to fruits and vegetables."

Sears operates a "health coach" certification website, The Dr. Sears Wellness Institute.

In 2012, Time ran a cover story about the life and legacy of Sears titled "The Man Who Remade Motherhood", which examined Sears' life and career.

== Personal life ==
In 1997, Sears was diagnosed with Stage III colon cancer, which went into remission after treatment. Sears and his wife Martha, a registered nurse, have eight children. Three of their children have also become doctors: Jim (the oldest), who is a co-host of The Doctors, Bob (second oldest), and Peter.

As of 2009, Sears lives in San Clemente, California, and operates a private medical practice (Sears Family Pediatrics) in Capistrano Beach, California with his sons.

== Reception ==
As of 2012, Sears had published over 40 works, which were translated into 18 languages. Sears' works promote the practice of attachment parenting, which emphasizes the importance of emotional availability and accessibility.

Sears has been criticized for recommending parenting techniques which are "burdensome" or demanding of parents, particularly mothers whom he recommends stay at home with their infants. Attachment parenting has also been described as a fad by some.

== Selected works ==
- Nighttime Parenting (1985)
- The Baby Book (1993)
- The Discipline Book (1995)
- SIDS: A Parent's Guide to Understanding and Preventing Sudden Infant Death Syndrome (1996)
- The Complete Book of Christian Parenting and Child Care: A Medical and Moral Guide to Raising Happy Healthy Children (1997)
- The Attachment Parenting Book (2001)
- The Successful Child: What Parents Can Do to Help Kids Turn Out Well (2002)
- The Premature Baby Book: Everything You Need to Know About Your Premature Baby from Birth to Age One (2004)
- The Healthiest Kid In The Neighborhood (2006)
- The Pregnancy Book
- The Birth Book
- Parenting the Fussy Baby
- The A.D.D. Book
- The Breastfeeding Book
- The Family Nutrition Book
- The Dr. Sears T5 Wellness Plan
- Help Heal Yourself from Cancer
- The Inflammation Solution
- The Smart Health Plan: 5 Steps
