= Jimmy Cummings =

American actor

James Michael Cummings (born April 20, 1968 in South Boston, Massachusetts) is an American actor and producer and is the founder and CEO of Broadvision Entertainment. Cummings wrote and appeared in the movie Southie, which won the New American Cinema Competition Grand Jury Prize at the 24th annual Seattle International Film Festival. He is also a co-founder of Journey Forward, a non-profit organization dedicated to bettering the lives of those who have suffered a spinal cord injury.

== Career ==
Cummings began his career studying acting at the HB Studios in New York and at The Lee Strasberg Theatre Institute in New York and Los Angeles. He established himself as an actor with roles in the theater productions Dumb Waiter, The Street Poet and Tom Topor's Answers (which he also produced). After taking leading roles in the films Close Up and The Compulsion, he began to produce his own project titled Southie. He wrote the script and secured financing, then found a director (John Shea) and worked alongside Donnie Wahlberg, Rose McGowan, Will Arnett and Amanda Peete. In 1998 Southie was screened at festivals including the Nantucket Film Festival, the AFI Film Festival, the Montreal Film Festival and the Dublin Film Festival. Southie went on to win the New American Cinema Competition Grand Jury Prize at the 24th annual Seattle International Film Festival.

Cummings owned and was head of development for Silent Partner Entertainment from 2003 to 2006. He produced six episodes of the TV series Hollywood OS and the documentary Dig Fenway. He wrote and developed film projects including Mad Cowboys, The Tony Conigliaro Story and Golden: The Harry Agganis Story. He worked for 20th Century Fox as a staff writer and sold screenplays to producers Gale Anne Hurd, Valhalla Motion Pictures, Joel Silver at Silver Pictures and to studios like Warner Brothers. He has also worked with Donnie Wahlberg as an acting coach for the films and TV shows The Sixth Sense, Band of Brothers, Dreamcatcher, The Practice, Purgatory, Boomtown and The Taking of Pelham One Two Three.

From 2007 to 2012, Cummings was head of development at Gigapix Studios, where he produced the war documentary Baker Boys: Inside The Surge and also helped to guide Comedy Central's prime-time hit Workaholics.

From 2019 to 2021, Cummings appeared in six episodes of the Showtime TV series City on a Hill as the character Tommy Hayes.
