= Good for You =

Good for You may refer to:

== Albums ==
- Good for You (album), by Aminé, 2017
- Good for You, by Prelude, 1999

== Songs ==
- "Good for You" (Selena Gomez song), by Selena Gomez featuring ASAP Rocky, 2015
- "Good for You" (Spacey Jane song), by Spacey Jane, 2019
- "Good 4 U", by Olivia Rodrigo, 2021
- "Good for You", by Icona Pop from Icona Pop, 2012
- "Good for You", by Oxygiene 23 from Blue, 1995
- "Good for You", by Seiko Matsuda, 1996
- "Good for You", by Soul Asylum from The Silver Lining, 2006
- "Good for You", by Third Eye Blind from Third Eye Blind, 1997
- "Good for You", by Toto from Toto IV, 1982
- "Good for You", from the musical Dear Evan Hansen, 2015
- "Good for You", an original song from the TV series Smash, 2013

== Other uses ==
- Good for You (TV series), or You Are the Boss!, a 2013 South Korean drama series
- Good for You, a podcast by Whitney Cummings
- "Good for You", a storyline in the science fiction comedy webtoon series Live with Yourself!

== See also ==
- Good for Me (disambiguation)
- GFU (disambiguation)
