= Seiko Matsuda singles discography =

- Singles: 82
- Promotional singles: 8

Japanese singer-songwriter Seiko Matsuda has released eighty-two official singles and eight promotional singles.

Seiko released her debut album, Squall in August 1980; it peaked at number two in Japan and has sold over 500,000 copies. The second single from the album, "Aoi Sangoshou" became the fifteenth best-selling single of 1980 in Japan. Her second album, North Wind, was released in 1980 and became Matsuda's first number one album. One of her best-selling and critically acclaimed albums, Pineapple was released in 1982. The album peaked at number one in Japan and spawned two number one singles. In 1983, Matsuda released her most successful studio album to date, Utopia, which became the third best-selling album of the year in Japan. Her first English-language album, Sound of My Heart was released in 1985. The album was produced by Phil Ramone and peaked at number two in Japan. Her fifteenth studio album, Citron, which was produced by David Foster, was released in 1988 and became Matsuda's twelfth number one studio album.

Matsuda's global debut album, Seiko was released in 1990. The album has spawned a hit single, "The Right Combination". The single, which featured guest vocals by American singer Donnie Wahlberg, reached top 20 in Australia and Canada, as well as charting in Japan, the United States, and the United Kingdom. Matsuda's eleventh compilation album, Bible was released in 1991 and has been certified double platinum by the Recording Industry Association of Japan. In 1996, Matsuda released her twenty-seventh studio album, Vanity Fair. The album spawned her best-selling single, "Anata ni Aitakute: Missing You", and peaked at number two in Japan. Her third global album, Area 62 was released in 2002. The album has spawned two Billboard Dance Club Songs top twenty singles. Matsuda released the compilation album, We Love Seiko: 35th Anniversary Seiko Matsuda Kyūkyoku All-Time Best 50 Songs, which became her first top three album in 19 years. Her first jazz album, Seiko Jazz was released in 2017 through Verve Records and peaked at number six in Japan.

Matsuda is one of the best-selling music artists in Japan, having sold over 30 million records nationwide.

== As lead artist ==
=== 1980s ===
List of singles as lead artist, with selected chart positions and certifications, showing year released and album name
Title	Year	Peak chart positions	Sales	Certifications	Album
Title	Year	JPN	Sales	Certifications	Album
"Hadashi no Kisetsu"	1980	12	JPN: 282,000		Squall
"Aoi Sangoshou"	1980	2	JPN: 602,000	RIAJ: Gold (DL); RIAJ: Gold (ST)	Squall
"Kaze wa Akiiro"	1980	1	JPN: 796,000		North Wind
"Eighteen"	1980	1	JPN: 796,000		North Wind
"Cherry Blossom"	1981	1	JPN: 676,000		Silhouette
"Natsu no Tobira"	1981	1	JPN: 568,000		Silhouette
"Shiroi Parasol"	1981	1	JPN: 488,000		Kaze Tachinu
"Kaze Tachinu"	1981	1	JPN: 519,000		Kaze Tachinu
"Akai Sweet Pea"	1982	1	JPN: 500,000	RIAJ: Gold (DL); RIAJ: Gold (ST)	Pineapple
"Nagisa no Balcony"	1982	1	JPN: 514,000		Pineapple
"Komugiiro no Mermaid"	1982	1	JPN: 467,000		Non-album single
"Nobara no Etude"	1982	1	JPN: 450,000		Candy
"Himitsu no Hanazono"	1983	1	JPN: 396,000		Utopia
"Tengoku no Kiss"	1983	1	JPN: 471,000		Utopia
"Glass no Ringo"	1983	1	JPN: 857,000		Seiko Plaza
"Sweet Memories"	1983	1	JPN: 857,000	RIAJ: Gold (DL)	Seiko Plaza
"Hitomi wa Diamond"	1983	1	JPN: 568,000	RIAJ: Gold (DL)	Canary
"Aoi Photograph"	1983	1	JPN: 568,000		Canary
"Rock'n Rouge"	1984	1	JPN: 674,000		Tinker Bell
"Jikan no Kuni no Alice"	1984	1	JPN: 477,000		Tinker Bell
"Natsufuku no Eve"	1984	1	JPN: 477,000		Seiko Town
"Pink no Mozart"	1984	1	JPN: 424,000		Seiko Town
"Heart to Earring"	1984	1	JPN: 376,000		Windy Shadow
"Tenshi no Wink"	1985	1	JPN: 414,000		The 9th Wave
"Boy no Kisetsu"	1985	1	JPN: 356,000		The 9th Wave
"Dancing Shoes" (as Seiko)	1985	1	JPN: 186,000		Sound of My Heart
"Strawberry Time"	1987	1	JPN: 317,000		Strawberry Time
"Pearl-White Eve"	1987	1	JPN: 202,000		Snow Garden
"Marakech"	1988	1	JPN: 182,000		Citron
"Tabidachi wa Freesia"	1988	1	JPN: 209,000		Non-album single
"Precious Heart"	1989	2	JPN: 129,000		Precious Moment
"—" denotes releases that did not chart or were not released in that territory.

=== 1990s ===
List of singles as lead artist, with selected chart positions and certifications, showing year released and album name
Title	Year	Peak chart positions					Sales	Certifications	Album
Title	Year	JPN	AUS	UK	US	US Club	Sales	Certifications	Album
"All the Way to Heaven" (as Seiko)	1990	—	—	—	—	—			Seiko
"The Right Combination" (featuring Donnie Wahlberg) (as Seiko)	1990	28	11	44	54	—	JPN: 5,000		Seiko
"Who's That Boy" (as Seiko)	1990	—	—	—	—	—			Seiko
"We Are Love"	1990	16	—	—	—	—	JPN: 6,000		Non-album single
"Kitto, Mata Aeru..."	1992	4	—	—	—	—	JPN: 323,000	RIAJ: Gold	1992 Nouvelle Vague
"Anata no Subete ni Naritai"	1992	31	—	—	—	—	JPN: 5,000		1992 Nouvelle Vague
"Shinin' Shinin'"	1992	31	—	—	—	—	JPN: 5,000		1992 Nouvelle Vague
"Taisetsu na Anata"	1993	7	—	—	—	—	JPN: 384,000	RIAJ: Platinum	Non-album single
"A Touch of Destiny"	1993	51	—	—	—	—	JPN: 14,000		Diamond Expression
"Kakowarete, Aijing"	1993	63	—	—	—	—	JPN: 11,000		Non-album single
"Mou Ichido, Hajime kara"	1994	22	—	—	—	—	JPN: 65,000		Glorious Revolution
"Kagayaita Kisetsu e Tobitatou"	1994	12	—	—	—	—	JPN: 371,000	RIAJ: Gold	It's Style '95
"Suteki ni Once Again"	1995	22	—	—	—	—	JPN: 100,000		It's Style '95
"Anata ni Aitakute: Missing You"	1996	1	—	—	—	—	JPN: 1,101,000	RIAJ: Million	Vanity Fair
"Ashita e to Kakedashiteyukou"	1996	1	—	—	—	—	JPN: 1,101,000		Vanity Fair
"Let's Talk About It" (as Seiko)	1996	—	—	—	—	—			Was It the Future
"I'll Be There for You" (as Seiko) (featuring Robbie Nevil)	1996	35	—	—	—	—	JPN: 35,000		Was It the Future
"Sayonara no Shunkan"	1996	5	—	—	—	—	JPN: 201,000	RIAJ: Gold	Guardian Angel
"Good for You"	1996	—	—	—	—	38			Was It the Future
"Watashi dake no Tenshi: Angel"	1997	5	—	—	—	—	JPN: 248,000	RIAJ: Gold	My Story
"Anata no Sono Mune ni"	1997	5	—	—	—	—	JPN: 248,000		My Story
"Gone with the Rain"	1997	28	—	—	—	—	JPN: 17,000		Sweetest Time
"Koisuru Omoi: Fall in Love"	1998	34	—	—	—	—	JPN: 18,000		Forever
"Touch the Love"	1998	66	—	—	—	—	JPN: 7,000		Seiko '96-'98
"Kanashimi no Boat"	1999	27	—	—	—	—	JPN: 49,000		Eien no Shōjo
"—" denotes releases that did not chart or were not released in that territory.

=== 2000s ===
List of singles as lead artist, with selected chart positions and certifications, showing year released and album name
Title	Year	Peak chart positions		Sales	Album
Title	Year	JPN	US Club	Sales	Album
"20th Party"	2000	17	—	JPN: 36,000	20th Party
"Shanghai Love Song"	2000	37	—	JPN: 11,000	20th Party
"Unseasonable Shore"	2000	35	—	JPN: 11,000	20th Party
"True Love Story" (with Hiromi Go)	2000	7	—	JPN: 156,000	"Love" Seiko Matsuda 20th Anniversary Best Selection
"Sayonara no Kiss wo Wasurenai" (with Hiromi Goh)	2000	7	—	JPN: 156,000	"Love" Seiko Matsuda 20th Anniversary Best Selection
"The Sound of Fire"	2000	46	—	JPN: 12,000	Non-album single
"Anata shika Mienai"	2001	30	—	JPN: 11,000	Love & Emotion Vol. 1
"Ai Ai Emotion: 100% Pure Love"	2001	49	—	JPN: 7,000	Love & Emotion Vol. 2
"All to You"	2002	—	19		Area 62
"Suteki na Ashita"	2002	29	—	JPN: 14,000	Non-album single
"Just for Tonight"	2002	—	16		Area 62
"Call Me"	2003	17	—	JPN: 17,000	Sunshine
"Aitai"	2004	12	—	JPN: 40,000	Sunshine
"Smile on Me" (as Seiko) (with Crazy. T)	2004	18	—	JPN: 16,000	Non-album single
"Eien sae Kanjita Yoru"	2005	34	—	JPN: 10,000	Fairy
"I'll Fall in Love"	2005	30	—	JPN: 10,000	Bless You
"Shiawase na Kimochi"	2005	28	—	JPN: 7,000	Bless You
"Bless You"	2006	29	—	JPN: 5,000	Bless You
"We Are." (as PawPaw)	2006	—	—		Non-album single
"Namida ga tada Koborerudake"	2007	38	—	JPN: 7,000	Baby's Breath
"Manatsu no Yoru no Yume" (with Takashi Fujii)	2007	36	—	JPN: 7,000	Non-album singles
"Christmas no Yoru"	2007	34	—	JPN: 6,000	Non-album singles
"Hanabira Mau Kisetsu ni"	2008	32	—	JPN: 6,000	My Pure Melody
"Love Is All"	2008	32	—	JPN: 7,000	Non-album singles
"Ano Kagayaita Kisetsu"	2008	30	—	JPN: 6,000	Non-album singles
"—" denotes releases that did not chart or were not released in that territory.

=== 2010s ===
List of singles as lead artist, with selected chart positions and certifications, showing year released and album name
Title	Year	Peak chart positions		Sales	Certifications	Album
Title	Year	JPN Oricon	JPN Billboard	Sales	Certifications	Album
"Ikutsu no Yoake wo Kazoetara"	2010	12	30	JPN: 11,000		My Prelude
"Tokubetsu na Koibito"	2011	14	18	JPN: 28,000		Very Very
"Koe dake Kikasete"	2011	14	81	JPN: 28,000		Very Very
"Namida no Shizuku"	2012	20	74	JPN: 8,000		Very Very
"LuLu!"	2013	23	83	JPN: 6,000		A Girl in the Wonder Land
"Yume ga Samete" (featuring Chris Hart)	2013	14	4	JPN: 12,000		Song for You
"I Love You!: Anata no Hohoemi ni"	2014	27	—	JPN: 6,000		Dream & Fantasy
"Eien no Motto Hate made"	2015	11	14	JPN: 16,000		Shining Star
"Wakusei ni Naritai"	2015	11	—	JPN: 16,000		Shining Star
"Bara no youni Saite Sakura no youni Chitte"	2016	6	6	JPN: 26,000	RIAJ: Gold (DL)	Daisy
"—" denotes releases that did not chart or were not released in that territory.

== As featured artist ==
List of singles as lead artist, with selected chart positions and certifications, showing year released and album name
Title	Year	Peak chart positions	Sales	Album
Title	Year	JPN	Sales	Album
"Idol Mitai ni Utawasete" (Yazima Beauty Salon featuring Princess Seiko)	2010	16	JPN: 16,000	Yazima Beauty Salon The Movie Music Album

== Promotional singles ==
List of singles as lead artist, with selected chart positions and certifications, showing year released and album name
Title	Year	Certifications	Album
"Touch Me" (as Seiko)	1985		Sound of My Heart
"Ruriiro no Chikyuu"	1986	RIAJ: Gold (DL)	Supreme
"Jikan Ryokou"	1986		Supreme
"Daite..."	1987		Citron
"Atarashii Ashita"	2017		Merry-Go-Round
"Sweet Memories (Amai Kioku)"	2020		Seiko Matsuda 2020
"Ruriiro no Chikyuu 2020"	2020		Seiko Matsuda 2020
"Kaze ni Mukau Ichirin no Hana"	2020		Seiko Matsuda 2020
"Aoi Sangoshō (Blue Lagoon)"	2021		Seiko Matsuda 2021
"Jikan no Kuni no Alice (Alice in the World of Time)"	2021		Seiko Matsuda 2021
"Hitomi wa Diamond (Diamond Eyes)"	2021		Seiko Matsuda 2021
"Watashi no Ai"	2021		Seiko Matsuda 2021
"Akai Sweet Pie-English Jazz version"	2023		Seiko Jazz 3

== Guest appearances ==
List of non-single album appearances, with other performing artists, showing year released and album name
Title	Year	Other performer(s)	Album
"Put Our Hearts Together"	2012	Fourplay	Esprit De Four

== See also ==
- List of best-selling albums in Japan
