= Jim Wahlberg =

American film producer (born 1965)

- Born: James M. Wahlberg; August 19, 1965 (age 61); Dorchester, Boston, Massachusetts, U.S.
- Occupations: Producer; writer
- Years active: 2012–present
- Spouse: Bernarda Wahlberg (m. 1988)
- Children: 3, including Jeff Wahlberg
- Relatives: Donnie Wahlberg (brother); Jenny McCarthy (sister-in-law); Mark Wahlberg (brother); Rhea Durham (sister-in-law); Robert Wahlberg (brother); Paul Wahlberg (brother)
- Website: jimwahlberg.com

James M. Wahlberg (born August 19, 1965) is an American film producer and screenwriter.

== Early life ==
Wahlberg was born in Dorchester, a neighborhood of Boston, to Donald (1930–2008) and Alma Elaine Wahlberg (née Donnelly; 1942–2021). He is the fifth of nine children, with siblings Arthur, Paul, Robert, Tracey, Michelle, Debbie, Donnie, and Mark. As a young person, Jim was in-and-out of juvenile detention centers and became briefly homeless when he was twelve years old. Throughout his teens, Wahlberg struggled with drug and alcohol addiction every day of his life and he lived essentially on his own. Wahlberg's criminal record grew to include arrests for public drunkenness and disorderly conduct which then led to two jail sentences before the age of twenty-two. While in prison after being convicted of armed robbery, Wahlberg found faith in God, and began to end his addiction to alcohol (which he had regularly consumed since he was eight) and drugs (which he had regularly consumed since he was ten). After exiting prison, he became an advocate for individuals suffering from addiction and hoped to help addicts escape the cycle of addiction.

== Career ==
=== Film and television ===
Wahlberg followed in the footsteps of his brothers Mark and Donnie and entered the film industry through the creation of Wahl St. Productions, a film, television, and web content production company. Wahl St. Productions is credited for films such as The Circle of Addiction: A Different Kind of Tears (2018), If Only (2015), and What About the Kids? (2020). The films showcase the harsh realities of addiction and have featured family members of people who have died of an accidental overdose as extras and actors. What About the Kids? showed the effects of addiction through the lens of a child. Wahlberg's films and documentaries aim to dissolve the stigma of addiction and substance abuse.

Walhberg is also known for being a personality on the A&E show Wahlburgers which took a deep dive into the lives and families behind the successful restaurant chain. A special episode featured Wahlberg as he successfully ran the Boston Marathon in tribute to those that lost their lives in the Boston Marathon Bombing a year prior. In 2015, an exclusive Wahlburgers episode, aired the Festival of Families celebration in Philadelphia, where Jim and brothers Donnie and Mark met with Pope Francis, thus furthering Wahlberg's relationship with his faith.

Wahlberg is an executive producer of The Lookalike, starring Justin Long. He is credited as an executive producer on Wahl Street, a docu-series that aired in 2021 on HBO Max that followed his brother Mark Wahlberg's business interests. Jim was featured on the long-running Christian Broadcasting Network The 700 Club twice.

=== Writing ===
Wahlberg wrote his first book in August 2020, debuting his memoir The Big Hustle: A Boston Street Kid's Story of Addiction and Redemption. The book summarizes the struggles of his drug addiction and the redemption story of his faith. The memoir debuted to praise from critics for its brutal honesty and transparent storytelling and was sold out on Amazon in the first week. Jim Caviezel wrote the foreword to the book.

== Personal life ==
Wahlberg married long-time girlfriend Bernarda aka Bennie in 1988. The couple live in South Florida and have three children: son Daniel Wahlberg (b. 1997) and fraternal twins Jeff and Kyra (b. 1996). His son Jeff is an actor and has appeared in films such as Dora and the Lost City of Gold (2019), Cherry (2021), and Future World (2018).

Wahlberg is a devout Catholic; in an interview on The Catholic Talk Show, he gave all praise and credit to Jesus Christ, and the Catholic Church for his life.

Wahlberg is also the host of The Bottom Line, a podcast that highlights the stories of individuals and their struggles and eventual breakthroughs with addiction. The show featured athletes and entertainers such as Darryl Strawberry, Chris Mullin, and Brandon Novak.

Wahlberg has been outspoken about the need for additional recovery and 12 step options during the COVID-19 pandemic. In October 2020, he wrote an opinion piece in USA Today about the dangers of isolation and addiction amid the pandemic. In an interview with Raymond Arroyo for Eternal Word Television Network, Wahlberg opens up about his history of crime, abuse, and meeting Mother Teresa while in prison; he states "It was the absolute most defining moment in my life, it's the moment that everything changed for me."

Wahlberg currently serves as the executive director of the Mark Wahlberg Youth Foundation (MWYF) which was created to improve the quality of life for inner-city kids.

== Credits ==
=== Filmography ===
Year	Title	Role	Notes	Ref.
2012	A Feeling from Within	Producer	Film	
2014	The Lookalike	Producer	Feature film	
2015	Instant Gratification	Executive producer	Short film	
2015	If Only	Writer / Producer	Short film	
2015–2019	Wahlburgers	Producer / Cast member	Reality TV series	
2016	Toyed	Executive producer	Short film	
2018	The Circle of Addiction: A Different Kind of Tears	Director / Producer / Writer	Short film	
2019	I Played the Giants on a Monday Night	Executive producer	Short film	
2019	In Their Shoes: Unheard Stories of Reentry & Recovery	Executive Producer	Documentary film	
2020	What About the Kids?	Director / Producer / Writer	Short film	
2021	Wahl Street	Executive producer	Docuseries, 6 episodes	
2022	Mother Theresa: No Greater Love	Executive producer	Short film	
2023	Breaking the Chains: Jim Wahlberg's Journey to Faith	Himself	Short film	
2024	Out of the Ashes	Director / Producer	Film	
2024	Jesus Thirsts: The Miracle of the Eucharist	Producer	Documentary film	
2025	Wired for Holiness: The Life of Blessed Carlo Acutis (aka Carlo Acutis: Roadmap to Reality)	Producer	Documentary film	

=== Podcast ===
Year	Title	Role	Ref.
	The Bottom Line	Host	

=== Bibliography ===
Year	Title	Role	Ref.
2020	The Big Hustle: A Boston Street Kid's Story of Addiction and Redemption	Author	
