= National Coalition for Cancer Survivorship =

Non-profit organization in the US

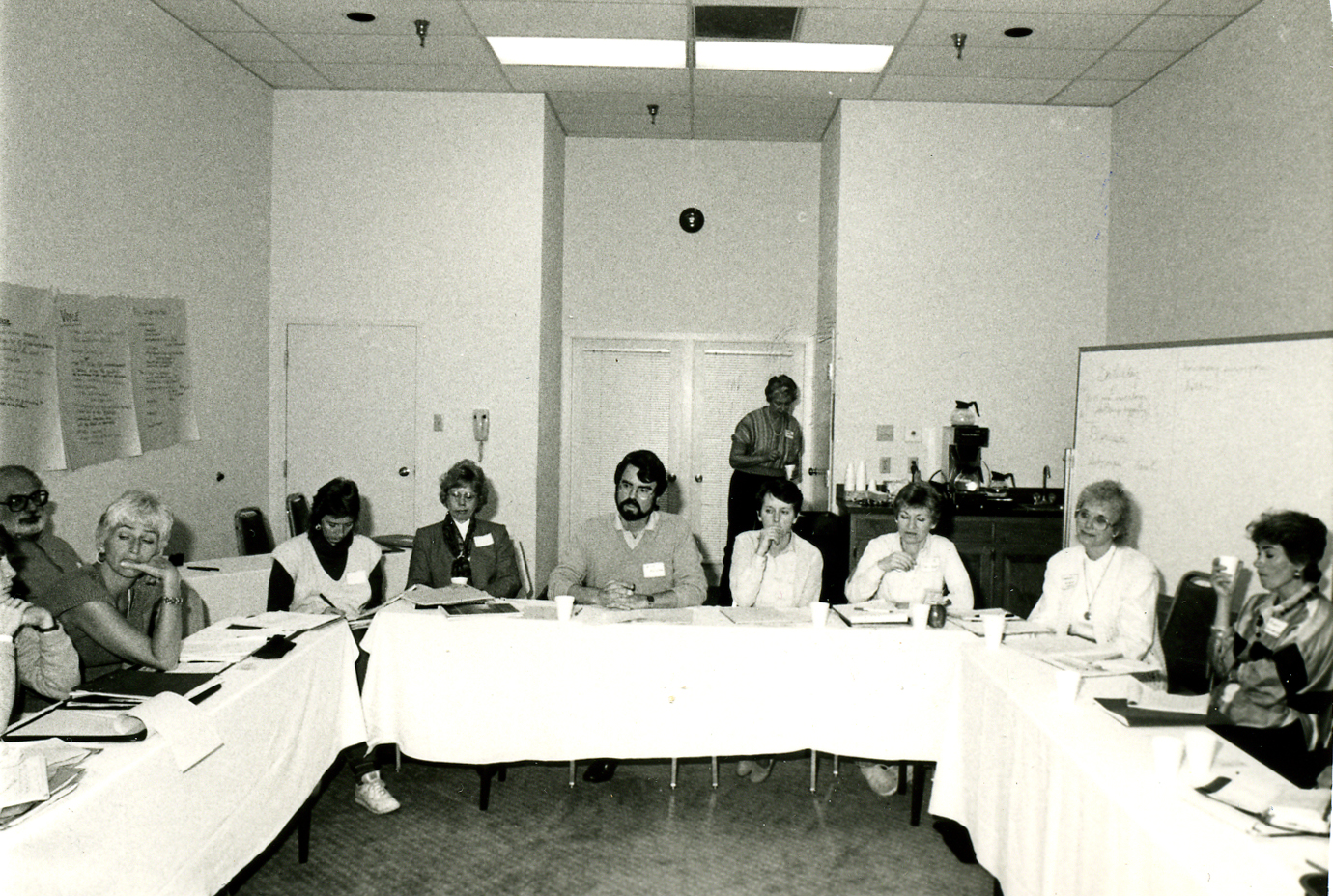
- Founded: October 26, 1986
- Purpose: Cancer Survivorship
- Location: 8455 Colesville Road, Suite 930, Silver Spring, Maryland, 20910
- Region served: United States
- Key people: Shelley Fuld Nasso, CEO
- Employees: 6
- Website: canceradvocacy.org

The National Coalition for Cancer Survivorship (NCCS) is a 501(c)(3) nonprofit organization cancer advocacy organization based in Silver Spring, Maryland. It is the oldest survivor-led cancer advocacy organization in the country, and works to effect policy change at the national level.

== History and milestones ==
NCCS was founded in Albuquerque, New Mexico, in October 1986. It was established as a 501(c)(3) non-profit by the Internal Revenue Service in 1987. NCCS relocated to the Washington, DC area in 1992. One year later, NCCS convened other patient advocates to create the Cancer Leadership Council (CLC).

NCCS pioneered the definition of a cancer survivor as being any person diagnosed with cancer, from the time of initial diagnosis until his or her death. This expansive definition also includes family members, friends, and caregivers of those diagnosed, and is the definition used by the U.S. National Cancer Institute's Office of Cancer Survivorship.

In 1998, NCCS led the national grassroots campaign THE MARCH...Coming Together to Conquer Cancer. An estimated 80,000-150,000 people attended the event in the nation's capital.

Journey Forward, a treatment summary program, was launched in partnership with three other organizations in 2009.

== Publications and Advocacy ==
On June 7, 2000, President Clinton issued an executive memorandum guaranteeing that Medicare beneficiaries who enroll in approved, high-quality clinical trials will have their routine patient care costs covered by Medicare. Ellen Stovall, NCCS’s Executive Director at the time, as well as other patient advocates, advocated for the measure that allowed more seniors to participate in clinical trials.

NCCS published Imperatives for Quality Cancer Care: Access, Action and Accountability in 1996. The report led to the creating of the National Cancer Institute’s Office of Cancer Survivorship. From 2001-2007 NCCS contributed to several Institute of Medicine Reports related to quality care and survivorship. These reports include Ensuring Quality Cancer Care; Improving Palliative Care for Cancer; From Cancer Patient to Cancer Survivor: Lost in Transition; Childhood Cancer Survivorship: Improving Care and Quality of Life; and Cancer Care for the Whole Patient: Meeting Psychosocial Health Needs.

In 2008, NCCS played a leadership role in the creation of the "Blueprint" for quality cancer care, a focus of the Cancer Quality Alliance. The Blueprint for a Better Cancer Care System includes a set of five cancer care case studies that present examples of systems failures, interventions, and action steps.

In 2010, NCCS became one of four patient-centered organizations invited to a membership of the Commission on Cancer (CoC) of the American College of Surgeons. These four organizations worked with the CoC to develop new patient-centered standards.

== Cancer Survival Toolbox ==
The Cancer Survival Toolbox is a free, self-learning audio program, developed through collaboration with patient advocacy organizations and health care and social work professionals to help people develop important skills to better meet and understand the challenges of their illness. The program, first published in 1998, contains a set of basic skills to help navigate a diagnosis and special topics on key issues faced by people with cancer. In 2009, two modules were added: Living with Multiple Myeloma and Living with Non-Hodgkin Lymphoma.

The Cancer Survival Toolbox has won several awards including the Public Service Partnership Award of Excellence from the Public Relations Society of America, The 16th Annual National Health Information Awards, and the Gold Star Award, the National Cancer Institute’s highest award for patient education. The program is available for free in compact disc and MP3 format through the NCCS website and iTunes.

== Journey Forward ==
Journey Forward was launched in February 2009 through a partnership between NCCS, WellPoint, Inc., the UCLA Cancer Survivorship Center and Genentech. Journey Forward is a program that promotes the use of treatment summaries and follow-up plans that give clear steps for care and monitoring after active cancer treatment. Journey Forward’s Survivorship Care Plan Builder is available for use by any oncologist. In addition, Journey Forward offers an electronic Medical History Builder where patients can record their health history.

== See also ==
- Cancer Control Month
