= Seiko Matsuda videography =

Japanese singer-songwriter Seiko Matsuda has released 50 concert tour videos, 18 music video compilation and starred in 13 theatrical movies.

In 1981, she got main role in the movie Nogiku no Hana and debuted as an movie actresses, in 1982 she released her first home-video release, in 1985 she provided voice-acting role in the children movie and in 1991 she released her first music-video compilation.

== Video albums ==
=== Concert tour videos ===
Title	Release details
Fantastic Concert: Lemon no Kisetsu	Released: June 21, 1982; Label: Sony; Formats: VHS · Betamax · LD · LD single · DVD · Blu-ray
Seikoland: Budokan Live '83	Released: February 25, 1984; Label: Sony; Formats: LD · DVD · Blu-ray
Seiko Call: Live'85〜	Released: August 1 1985; Label: Sony; Formats: VHS · LD · DVD · Blu-ray
Super Diamond Revolution	Released: September 2, 1987; Label: Sony; Formats: VHS · LD · DVD · Blu-ray
Sweet Spark Stream	Released: September 14, 1989; Label: Sony; Formats: VHS · LD · DVD · Blu-ray
Precious Moment: 1990 Live At The Budokan	Released: April 21, 1990; Label: Sony; Formats: VHS · LD · DVD
1991 Concert Tour Amusement Park	Released: September 21, 1991; Label: Sony; Formats: VHS · LD · DVD
LIVE 1992 Nouvelle Vague	Released: October 1, 1992; Label: Sony; Formats: VHS · LD · DVD
LIVE DIAMOND EXPRESSION	Released: November 1, 1993; Label: Sony; Formats: VHS · LD · DVD
Live Glorious Revolution	Released: October 21, 1993; Label: Sony; Formats: VHS · DVD
Video Bible: Best Hits Video History	Released:March 24, 1995; Label: Sony; Formats: VHS · DVD
LIVE It's Style'95	Released: November 22, 1995; Label: Sony; Formats: VHS · DVD
Live Vanity Fair'96	Released: November 11, 1996; Label: Sony; Formats: VHS · DVD
Seiko Live'97 My Story	Released: October 8, 1997; Label: Mercury Records; Formats: VHS · DVD
Seiko Live'98 FOREVER	Released: October 21, 1998; Label: Mercury Records; Formats: VHS · DVD
Seiko Matsuda Zepp Tour 1999	Released: March 29, 2000; Label: Mercury Records; Formats: VHS · DVD
Seiko Matsuda Concert Tour 2000 20th Party	Released: December 13, 2000; Label: Universal; Formats: VHS · DVD
Seiko Matsuda Concert Tour 2001 LOVE & EMOTION	Released: November 28, 2001; Label: Universal; Formats: VHS · DVD
Seiko Matsuda Concert Tour 2002 Jewel Box	Released: November 20, 2002; Label: Sony; Formats: VHS · DVD
SEIKO MATSUDA CONCERT TOUR 2003 Call me	Released: November 27, 2003; Label: Sony; Formats: VHS · DVD
SEIKO MATSUDA COUNT DOWN LIVE PARTY 2003-2004	Released: March 10, 2004; Label: Sony; Formats: VHS · DVD
SEIKO MATSUDA CONCERT TOUR 2004 Sunshine	Released: November 17, 2004; Label: Sony; Formats: VHS · DVD
25th Anniversary SEIKO MATSUDA CONCERT TOUR 2005 fairy	Released: November 23, 2005; Label: Sony; Formats: VHS · DVD
SEIKO MATSUDA COUNT DOWN LIVE PARTY 2005-2006	Released: March 28, 2006; Label: Sony; Formats: VHS · DVD
SEIKO MATSUDA CONCERT TOUR 2006 bless you	Released: September 20, 2006; Label: Sony; Formats: DVD
SEIKO MATSUDA COUNT DOWN LIVE PARTY 2006-2007	Released: March 28, 2007; Label: Sony; Formats: DVD
SEIKO MATSUDA CONCERT TOUR 2007 Baby's breath	Released: September 19, 2007; Label: Sony; Formats: DVD
SEIKO MATSUDA COUNT DOWN LIVE PARTY 2007-2008	Released: March 16, 2008; Label: Sony; Formats: DVD
SEIKO MATSUDA CONCERT TOUR 2008 My pure melody	Released: October 22, 2008; Label: Sony; Formats: DVD
SEIKO MATSUDA COUNT DOWN LIVE PARTY 2008-2009	Released: March 18, 2009; Label: Sony; Formats: DVD
Seiko Matsuda Concert Tour 2009 "My Precious Songs"	Released: November 18, 2009; Label: Sony; Formats: DVD
Seiko Matsuda COUNT DOWN LIVE PARTY 2009-2010	Released: March 31, 2010; Label: Sony; Formats: DVD
SEIKO MATSUDA CONCERT TOUR 2010 "My Prelude""	Released: November 17, 2010; Label: Sony; Formats: DVD
Seiko Matsuda COUNT DOWN LIVE PARTY 2010-2011	Released: April 13, 2011; Label: Sony; Formats: DVD
Seiko Matsuda Concert Tour 2011 Cherish	Released: November 23, 2011; Label: Sony; Formats: DVD
SEIKO MATSUDA Count Down Live Party 2011-2012	Released: March 28, 2012; Label: Sony; Formats: DVD
Seiko Matsuda Concert Tour 2012 Very Very	Released: November 14, 2012; Label: Sony; Formats: DVD
Seiko Ballad 2012	Released: March 27, 2013; Label: Sony; Formats: DVD
SEIKO MATSUDA CONCERT TOUR 2013 "A Girl in the Wonder Land":BUDOKAN 100th ANNIVERSARY	Released: November 20, 2013; Label: Sony; Formats: DVD
2013 New Year's Eve Live Party: Count Down Concert 2013-2014	Released: March 26, 2014; Label: Sony; Formats: DVD
Pre 35th Anniversary: Seiko Matsuda Concert Tour 2014 Dream & Fantasy	Released: November 12, 2014; Label: Sony; Formats: DVD
35th Anniversary: Seiko Matsuda Concert Tour 2015 "Bibbidi-Bobbidi-Boo"	Released: December 9, 2015; Label: Sony; Formats: DVD
Seiko Matsuda Concert Tour 2016 Shining Star	Released: November 16, 2016; Label: Universal; Formats: DVD
Seiko Matsuda Concert Tour 2017 Daisy	Released: November 15, 2017; Label: Universal; Formats: DVD
Seiko Matsuda Concert Tour 2018 Merry-go-round	Released: November 14, 2018; Label: Universal; Formats: DVD
Pre 40th Anniversary Seiko Matsuda Concert Tour 2019 "Seiko's Singles Collection"	Released: November 20, 2019; Label: Universal; Formats: DVD
Happy Anniversary Seiko Matsuda Concert Tour 2020-2021 "Singles & Very Best Songs Collection!"	Released: November 24, 2021; Label: Universal; Formats: DVD
Seiko Matsuda Concert Tour 2022 "My Favorite Singles & Best Songs at Saitama Super Arena"	Released: December 14, 2022; Label: Universal; Formats: DVD

=== Music video compilations ===
Title	Release details
Seiko Clips	Released: August 1, 1991; Label: Sony; Formats: VHS · Betamax · LD · 8mm · DVD
Seiko Clips2 1992 Nouvelle Vague	Released: June 1, 1992; Label: Sony; Formats: VHS · Betamax · LD · DVD
Seiko Clips3 DIAMOND EXPRESSION	Released: June 21, 1993; Label: Sony; Formats: VHS · Betamax · LD · DVD
Seiko Clips4 Glorious Revolution	Released: June 22, 1994; Label: Sony; Formats: VHS · DVD
Seiko Clips5 It's Style'95	Released: July 1, 1995; Label: Sony; Formats: VHS · DVD
Vanity Fair	Released: June 3, 1996; Label: Sony; Formats: VHS · DVD
WAS IT THE FUTURE	Released: December 12, 1997; Label: Mercury Records; Formats: VHS · DVD
My Story	Released: June 4, 1997; Label: Mercury Records; Formats: VHS · DVD
Forever	Released: June 1, 1998; Label: Mercury Records; Formats: VHS · DVD
Seiko 96-98	Released: December 2, 1998; Label: Mercury Records; Formats: VHS · DVD
Video the LOVE: Seiko Matsuda 20th Anniversary Video Collection 1996-2000	Released: March 28, 2001; Label: Universal; Formats: VHS · DVD
SEIKO LOVE & EMOTION	Released: March 27, 2002; Label: Universal; Formats: VHS · DVD
Seiko Matsuda Video Diamond Bible	Released: September 9, 2010; Label: Sony; Formats: DVD

=== Box sets ===
Title	Release details
25th Anniversary Seiko Matsuda PREMIUM DVD BOX	Contains: Fantastic Concert: Lemon no Kisetsu, Seikoland: Budokan Live '83, Seiko Call: Live'85, Super Diamond Revolution, Sweet Spark Stream, Precious Moment: 1990 Live At The Budokan,1991 Concert Tour Amusement Park,LIVE 1992 Nouvelle Vague,LIVE DIAMOND EXPRESSION,Live Glorious Revolution,Seiko Clips,Seiko Clips2 1992 Nouvelle Vague,Seiko Clips3 DIAMOND EXPRESSION,Seiko Clips4 Glorious Revolution,Seiko Clips5 It's Style'95 and PREMIUM CLIP COLLECTION (includes previously unreleased music videoclips); Released: June 8, 2005; Label: Sony; Formats: 13-DVD

== Filmography ==
Year	Title	Role	Notes	Ref.
1981	Nogiku no Haka	Minko	Main role	
1983	Purumeria no Densetsu Tengoku no Kiss	Emiko Hayasaka	Main role	
1984	Natsufuku no Eve	Makiko Fujieda	Main role	
1985	Karibu Ai no Symphony	Aya Sawaki	Main role	
1985	Penguin's Memory: Shiawase Monogatari	Gil	Voice role	
1990	Docchimo Docchi	Ayuko Kadowaki	Main role	
1996	Final Vendetta	Naomi Nomura	Main role	
1998	Armageddon	Asian Tourist-Female	Cameo role	
1999	Drop Dead Gorgeous	Tina/Seiko Howard	Minor role	
2000	GEDO The Final Blade	Saemi	Main role	
2001	Sennen no Koi Story of Genji	Agewa no Kimi	Minor role	
2007	Shanghai Baby	Madonna	Main role	
2008	Grave of the Fireflies	Seita's mother	Minor role	
2010	Yazima Beauty Salon The Movie	Princess Seiko	Minor role	
2018	Kazoku no Recipe (Ramen Teh)	Miki	Main role	

== See also ==
- Seiko Matsuda singles discography
- Seiko Matsuda albums discography
- List of best-selling music artists in Japan
