= The Right Combination =

The Right Combination may refer to:

- The Right Combination (Joe Albany album), 1958
- The Right Combination (Linda Clifford and Curtis Mayfield album), 1980
- The Right Combination • Burning the Midnight Oil, an album by Porter Wagoner and Dolly Parton, 1972
- "The Right Combination" (song), by Seiko and Donnie Wahlberg, 1990
