= URBN hotels Shanghai =

Boutique hotel in Shanghai, China

URBN Hotel Shanghai

General information
- Location: Jing'an District, Shanghai, China, 183 Jiaozhou Road
- Opening: 2008
- Owner: Cachet Hotel Group (since 2014)

Design and construction
- Architect: A00 Architecture (Raefer Wallis)

Other information
- Number of rooms: 26

URBN Hotel Shanghai is a 26-room boutique hotel in Jing'an District, Shanghai, China. It opened in 2008 in a converted industrial building and was promoted as China's first carbon-neutral hotel. In 2014 Cachet Hotel Group took full ownership of the URBN brand.

== History ==
URBN was opened in 2008 by the entrepreneurs Scott Barrack and Jules Kwan. The American businessman Robert Roche was an early investor. The hotel won a 2008 HICAP Sustainable Hotel Award for site selection, sustainability, and architectural and physical design, and was selected for the Fodor's 100 Hotel Awards in 2011.

In January 2014, Cachet Hotel Group, which Roche had co-founded with Alexander Mirza, took full ownership of the URBN brand. Cachet marketed URBN as environmentally friendly. The hotel was renovated and reopened in September 2014, with a new look planned by the fashion designer Jay Godfrey. It was still operating under the URBN name in 2024.

== Design ==
The hotel building was a former prosthetics factory that later served as a post office. It was designed by the Shanghai firm A00 Architecture with Canadian architect Raefer Wallis as director.

The conversion used recycled and locally sourced materials, including reclaimed wood and bricks salvaged from demolished buildings in Shanghai, and old suitcases decorate the public spaces. The interiors avoided manufactured materials made with glues that release fumes and the building used passive solar shading and a water-based air conditioning system. Its restaurant was created by the chef David Laris.

== Carbon neutrality ==
At its opening, URBN was described as China's first carbon-neutral hotel. It offset its emissions by buying carbon credits through the firm South Pole, and offered guests the option of offsetting their flights. The 2014 renovation added beds made from natural materials and an air purification system.
