= American Chamber of Commerce Japan =

Non-profit for American expats in Japan

American Chamber of Commerce in Japan
- Abbreviation: ACCJ
- Formation: August 24, 1948; 78 years ago
- Type: Advocacy group
- Legal status: Non-Profit
- Purpose: Advocacy
- Headquarters: Tokyo, Japan
- Location: Japan
- President: Om Prakash II
- Main organ: Board of Governors
- Website: www.accj.or.jp

The American Chamber of Commerce in Japan (ACCJ, Japanese: 在日米国商工会議所, Zainichi Beikoku Shōkō Kaigisho) is a non-profit business organization consisting mainly of executives from American companies. Currently, the ACCJ has over 3,000 members representing over 600 companies with chapters located in the Tokyo, Kansai and Chubu regions.

== History ==
The ACCJ was established in 1948 by representatives of 40 American companies. Originally, the ACCJ had six committees and nine board members.

The ACCJ claims to be Japan's most influential foreign business organization, and serves as the primary forum for the foreign business community in Japan to identify and pursue shared interests and goals. There are more than sixty Chamber committees, subcommittees, task forces, and advisory councils that cover such diverse areas as: financial services, corporate social responsibility, marketing, independent business, healthcare services, e-business, transportation and logistics, legal services, the travel industry, and human resource management.

== Programs ==
The ACCJ committees combined hold over 500 programs annually, and these events are exclusively attended by ACCJ members and their accompanying guests. Speakers are drawn from the ranks of global business leaders, top U.S. and Japanese government officials, industry experts, scholars and pop culture icons. Former speakers Prime Minister of Japan, Shinzo Abe; JP Morgan Japan Director of Research, Jesper Koll; Rakuten Inc CEO, Hiroshi Mikitani; General Electric CEO, Jeffrey R. Immelt; U.S. Chamber of Commerce CEO, Tom J. Donohue; former Governor of California, Arnold Schwarzenegger; U.S. Department of Energy Secretary, Steven Chu; Transportation Secretary, Ray LaHood; Homeland Security Secretary, Janet Napolitano; U.S. Ambassador to Japan, Caroline Kennedy, and many others have chosen the ACCJ as their forum for addressing Japan's international business community.

== Advocacy ==
As a key stakeholder in the commercial relationship between the United States and Japan, the ACCJ works to influence the discussions that frame policy in both countries. The ACCJ issues its official positions on policy issues in Viewpoint position papers, white papers, public comments and other reports. The ultimate goal of these policy positions and the advocacy carried out to communicate them and promote their implementation is to further the mission of the ACCJ to improve the business environment in Japan for Chamber members.

== ACCJ Board of Governors (as of 2025) ==
Leadership positions within the ACCJ are held by elected officials who represent top-level Japanese businesspeople and expats in Japan from the U.S. and around the globe.

Leadership Position	Member Name	Company Title
President	Victor Osumi	Chief Executive Officer, Aerialence Partners
Chairman	Christopher LaFleur	Senior Director for Japan, McLarty Associates
Vice President—Tokyo	Sarah Bader	Managing Director and Principal Representative in Japan, Gensler Associates International Ltd
Vice President—Tokyo	Megan Barstow	President & Representative Director, Edelman Japan
Vice President—Tokyo	Hans Klemm	Japan Representative, Pharmaceutical Research and Manufacturers of America
Vice President—Tokyo	Arthur Mitchell	Senior Adviser, White & Case LLP
Vice President—Tokyo	David Richards	Managing Director, Chief Administrative Officer, Morgan Stanley MUFG Securities Co., Ltd.
Vice President—Kansai	Jiro Kawakami	Senior Vice President, MGM Resorts Japan LLC
Vice President—Chubu	Robert W. Roche	Executive Chairman and President, Oak Lawn Marketing, Inc.
Treasurer—Tokyo	John Kawase	Chief Financial Officer, Amway Japan G.K.
Treasurer—Kansai		
Treasurer—Chubu	Jorma Winkler	President, Maikai Wood Hawaii
Governor—Tokyo	Christopher Clark	General Manager, JW Marriott Hotel Tokyo
Governor—Tokyo	Andrew J. Conrad	Executive Vice President and Chief Operating Officer, Aflac International, Inc.
Governor—Tokyo	Rebecca Green	Partner, ERM
Governor—Tokyo	Mitsuhiko Ida	Operating Officer, Policy and Public Affairs Japan Lead, Pfizer Japan Inc.
Governor—Tokyo	Eric John	President, Boeing Japan KK
Governor—Tokyo	Connor Myers	Government Affairs and Public Policy Manager, Geo and Public Sector, Google Japan G.K.
Governor—Tokyo	Tomoko Naoe	Country Manager & Director - Policy, Japan Business Software Alliance
Governor—Tokyo	Nancy L. Ngou	Associate Partner, EY Strategy and Consulting Co., Ltd.
Governor—Tokyo	Yumiko Ohta	Partner, Orrick, Herrington & Sutcliffe LLP
Governor—Tokyo	Frank Packard	Partner, Eight Peaks Partners GK
Governor—Tokyo	Eric Sedlak	Partner, Registered Foreign Lawyer, K&L Gates Gaikokuho Joint Enterprise
Governor—Tokyo	Megumi Takayama	Senior Vice President, Weber Shandwick
Governor—Kansai	Simone Thomsen	President and Representative Director, Eli Lilly Japan K.K.
Governor—Chubu	Julian Bashore	Managing Director (Japan), Bodo Möller Chemie
Executive Director	Laura Younger	
