= Cachet Hotel Group =

American company

Cachet Hospitality Group
- Formerly: Cachet Hotel Group
- Industry: Hospitality
- Founded: May 2013
- Founders: Robert Roche; Alexander Mirza
- Headquarters: Hong Kong
- Area served: China, Thailand, United States, Mexico
- Brands: URBN; Cachet Deluxe; Cachet Boutique; Cachet Beach; Savant
- Services: Hotel and restaurant management

Cachet Hospitality Group (CHG), founded as Cachet Hotel Group, is a hotel and restaurant management company founded in Hong Kong in May 2013 by Robert Roche and Alexander Mirza. Cachet presented its hotels as "fashion brands", and its brands included the luxury Cachet Deluxe, the environmentally focused URBN, Cachet Boutique and the midscale lifestyle brand Savant. The company started in China, where in 2014 it took full ownership of two boutique hotels in Shanghai and rebranded both. It later added hotels in Kunming and Shaoxing. From 2016 it expanded internationally, adding hotels in California, Mexico, Thailand and New York City.

== History ==
=== Founding and Shanghai ===
Roche and Mirza founded Cachet Hotel Group in May 2013 as a hotel management company headquartered in Hong Kong. It announced its launch in July 2013, with Roche as chairman and Mirza as chief executive officer. Its executive team at launch included fashion designer Jay Godfrey as lead designer, restaurateur David Laris as chief creative officer, Yvonne Choi as managing director, Martin Key as chief financial officer, Aaron Griffiths as president of food and beverage, and Kimy Chen as vice president of business development.

In January 2014 Cachet took full ownership of the URBN hotel in Shanghai, in which Roche had been an investor. The following month it took full ownership of the JIA boutique hotel in Shanghai, which reopened in 2014 as the 45-room Cachet Boutique Shanghai. URBN reopened in September 2014 after a renovation designed by Godfrey.

=== Expansion ===
In 2015 Cachet announced a Cachet Deluxe hotel in Hangzhou, and in January 2016 it signed the 52-room Cachet Boutique Zhejiang Circuit, beside a motor-racing circuit in Shaoxing. Also in 2016 it signed its first property in the United States, the Westlake Village Inn in California. The inn's owner and developer, John L. Notter, a former Hilton board member, became a major investor in Cachet and a founding member of its advisory board. In June 2016 the Arjomand Group of the United Arab Emirates took a minority stake in the company, which then had three hotels open and 29 in development. That year it also announced a resort in Guizhou designed by the architect Stefano Boeri.

By 2017 the company was operating as Cachet Hospitality Group. In January 2017 it opened the 77-room Cachet Beach Hotel in Cabo San Lucas, Mexico, the first phase of a dual-branded resort called Cachet Corazon. A second phase, the 204-room Cachet Deluxe Los Cabos, was planned for 2018. By early 2017 it had hotels in Shanghai, Los Angeles, Bangkok and Cabo San Lucas, and in April announced a second Bangkok hotel, the 72-room Savant Vela, planned to open in November 2017. In May 2017 it began managing the 128-room Cachet Resort Dewa Phuket in Thailand, which Cachet Interior Design was renovating. In September 2017 it opened Cachet Boutique Kunming, in the Caiyunli complex on the site of a former rubber factory in central Kunming. Later that year it opened the 105-room Cachet Boutique NYC in Midtown Manhattan.

== Concept ==
Cachet presented its hotels as "fashion brands", with Godfrey as lead designer, who said they would operate on "seasonal cycles", changing design elements, linens, menus and staff uniforms every quarter. It was also promoted with what was called an "East Meets West" approach to hospitality. In October 2015 it launched Cachet World, an online booking platform and lifestyle community for boutique hotels and high-end rentals, developed with IGT, a subsidiary of InterGlobe.

=== Design ===
In 2015 Cachet set up a global design center at its Bangkok office, home to its design arm, Cachet Interior Design, which worked with the company's lead designer, Godfrey. It designed the interiors of Cachet's hotels, including those in New York, Cabo San Lucas and Phuket.

In 2016 Cachet announced plans for a resort in Wanfeng Valley near Xingyi in Guizhou province, designed by Boeri with the Chinese artist Simon Ma. The building was conceived as a "vertical forest", with trees on every terrace irrigated with recycled water, and was to house a 182-room Cachet resort hotel and a 71-room URBN hotel. The design called for rebuilding a hill that had been flattened on the site, using traditional Guizhou materials.

=== Restaurants ===
Laris, the company's chief creative officer, was in charge of its restaurants. In January 2017 Cachet formed a joint venture with Wahlburgers and Farooq Arjomand, an investor in Cachet, to open Wahlburgers restaurants in Asia. Later that year Laris opened a restaurant, Eden Local, at Cachet Boutique NYC, and by May 2018 Cachet had brought chef Philippe Chow's Philippe restaurant brand to China, at its Shaoxing resort.

== Brands ==
At its launch in 2013 Cachet's brands included the environmentally focused URBN and the luxury brand Cachet. URBN took its name from the Shanghai hotel, which opened in 2008 and was described as China's first carbon-neutral hotel. The hotel was built from recycled and locally sourced materials and took part in a carbon-offset program. Godfrey's 2014 renovation of the hotel, part of what he called "positioning URBN as China's green brand", added beds made from natural materials and air purification systems.

Of the other Cachet-named brands, Cachet Deluxe was the luxury brand, planned for hotels in Bangkok and Hangzhou and for a 204-room second tower at the Cabo San Lucas resort. Cachet Boutique was first used for the former JIA hotel in Shanghai and later for the company's hotels in Kunming, Shaoxing and New York City. The first phase of the Cabo San Lucas resort opened under the Cachet Beach brand.

In 2016 the company launched Savant, a midscale lifestyle brand designed around prefabricated rooms, through a development agreement with Qingdao Izunco Inn Investment. It was aimed at tech-savvy travelers in China's second- and third-tier cities.
