= Rhea Durham =

American model

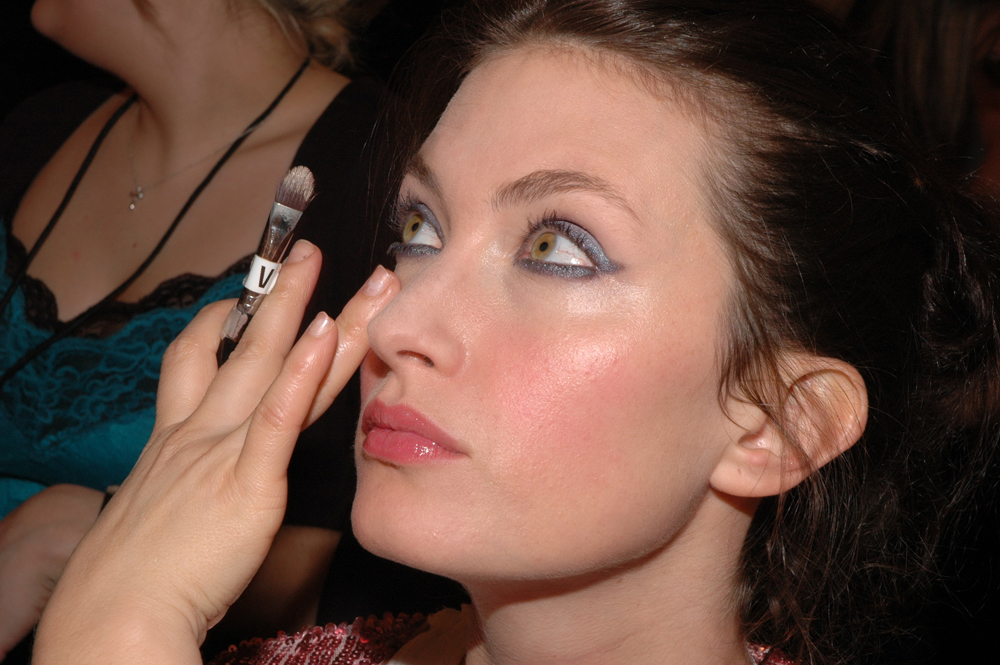
- Durham in 2005
- Born: July 1, 1978 (age 48); Lakeland, Florida, U.S.
- Occupation: Model
- Years active: 1995–present
- Spouse: Mark Wahlberg (m. 2009)
- Children: 4
- Relatives: Donnie Wahlberg (brother-in-law); Jim Wahlberg (brother-in-law); Robert Wahlberg (brother-in-law); Paul Wahlberg (brother-in-law); Jenny McCarthy (sister-in-law)
- Modeling information
- Height: 175 cm (5 ft 9 in)
- Hair color: Brown
- Eye color: Green

Rhea Durham (born July 1, 1978) is an American model. She has appeared on the covers of several major fashion magazines, including French Vogue, Marie Claire, and both the British and American editions of ELLE. She has walked in multiple Victoria's Secret Fashion Shows and has appeared in advertising campaigns for Louis Vuitton and the Dior Saddle bag. She guest-starred as herself on the 2001 Spin City episode "The Wedding Scammer".

== Personal life ==
Durham began a relationship with actor Mark Wahlberg in 2001. The couple have four children. They were married on August 1, 2009, in a private Catholic ceremony in Beverly Hills, California.

In 2009, Durham converted to Catholicism from Baptist Protestantism, receiving the sacraments of initiation.
