= Seiko (album) =

Studio album by Seiko Matsuda
- Released: June 7, 1990
- Recorded: 1989–1990
- Studios: The Hit Factory; Trax Recording Studio; Oasis Recording Studios; Mission Control Studios; Criteria Studios
- Genres: J-pop; pop
- Length: 40:16
- Labels: CBS/Sony; Columbia; Epic
- Producers: Jack Matsumura; Michael Jay; Maurice Starr; Clay Ostwald; Emilio Estefan; Jorge Casas; Giorgio Moroder; Jellybean; Phil Ramone

Seiko Matsuda chronology
Precious Moment (1989)	Seiko (1990)	We Are Love (1990)

Singles from Seiko
- 1. "All the Way to Heaven" Released: April 30, 1990; 2. "The Right Combination" Released: July 15, 1990; 3. "Who's That Boy" Released: October 1, 1990

Professional ratings
Review scores
Source	Rating
Select	1/5 medals

Seiko is the seventeenth and first internationally released English language studio album by Japanese singer-songwriter Seiko Matsuda (credited as Seiko). It was released on June 7, 1990, by CBS/Sony in Japan, Columbia Records in North America, and CBS/Epic Records in the UK. After becoming one of Japan's top pop divas of the 1980s, Matsuda sought to establish herself internationally, particularly in the United States and United Kingdom music markets. Her superstar status in Japan and other parts of Asia resulted in many top music producers of the time being hired to work with her on this album, including Maurice Starr, Phil Ramone, Giorgio Moroder, Jellybean, Michael Jay, Emilio Estefan and others. New Kids On The Block member Donnie Wahlberg also provided duet vocals on the album's second single, "The Right Combination".

Three singles were released from the album. The first single, "All the Way to Heaven", was released on April 30, 1990. "The Right Combination" was released on July 15, 1990, as the album's second single. A duet with Donnie Wahlberg from the boy band New Kids on the Block, it became the most internationally successful song in Matsuda's discography, charting in the United Kingdom, Australia, Canada, and Japan, as well as peaking at number fifty-four in the United States. It marked the first time in ten years a Japanese artist had a hit single on the United States Billboard Hot 100 singles chart, since the Yellow Magic Orchestra's "Computer Game" reached number sixty in 1980. The third and final single from the album, "Who's That Boy", was released in the United States on October 1, 1990.

Commercially, the album was a moderate success, peaking at number two in Japan and selling over 500,000 copies worldwide.

== Track listing ==
CD, digital download
No.	Title	Writer(s)	Producer(s)	Length
1.	"All the Way to Heaven"	Michael Cruz; Michael Jay	Cruz; Jay	3:40
2.	"He's So Good to Me"	Klarmann/Weber	Maurice Starr	4:14
3.	"Leave It Up to Fate"	Bill Duncan; Jon Secada; Willy Perez Feria	Clay Ostwald; Emilio Estefan; Jorge Casas	3:40
4.	"The Right Combination" (featuring Donnie Wahlberg)	Cruz; Jay	Starr	4:27
5.	"Goodbye My Baby"	Estefan; Teddy Mulet	Ostwald; Estefan; Casas	4:02
6.	"Who's That Boy"	Randy Goodrum; Glen Ballard	Jellybean	4:04
7.	"With Your Love"	Starr	Starr	4:20
8.	"Everybody Feels Alright"	Michael Morejon	Ostwald; Estefan; Casas	3:37
9.	"Halfway to Heaven"	Giorgio Moroder; Tom Whitlock	Moroder	3:40
10.	"Try Gettin' Over You"	Doug James; Michael Bolton	Phil Ramone	3:24

== Charts ==
Chart performance for Seiko
Chart (1990)	Peak position
Australian Albums (ARIA)	86
Japanese Albums (Oricon)	2
