= Robert Wahlberg =

American actor

- Born: Robert George Wahlberg; December 18, 1967 (age 58); Dorchester, Boston, Massachusetts, U.S.
- Occupation: Actor
- Years active: 1984–present
- Spouse: Gina Santangelo
- Children: 2
- Relatives: Donnie Wahlberg (brother); Jenny McCarthy (sister-in-law); Mark Wahlberg (brother); Rhea Durham (sister-in-law); Jim Wahlberg (brother); Paul Wahlberg (brother); Jeff Wahlberg (nephew)

Robert George Wahlberg (born December 18, 1967) is an American actor who has appeared in films such as Southie, Mystic River and The Departed.

== Life and career ==
Born in the Dorchester neighborhood of Boston, Robert is the brother of Arthur, Jim, Paul, Tracey, Michelle, Debbie (died 2003), and actors/musicians Mark and Donnie Wahlberg. He also has three half-siblings from his father's first marriage: Donna, Scott, and Buddy. His mother, Alma Elaine (née Donnelly; 1942–2021), was a bank clerk and nurse's aid, and his father, Donald Edmond Wahlberg, Sr. (1930–2008), was a teamster who worked as a delivery driver; the two divorced in 1982. His father, a U.S. Army veteran of the Korean War, died on February 14, 2008. His father was of Swedish and Irish descent, while his maternal ancestry is Irish, French-Canadian, and English.

He has two children, Oscar and Charlie, from his marriage to Gina Santangelo.

Wahlberg has appeared in films such as Southie, Orphan, Scenes of the Crime, Moonlight Mile, Mystic River, The Departed, Gone Baby Gone, Don McKay and The Equalizer.

== Filmography ==
Year	Title	Role	Notes
1998	Southie	Davey Quinn	
2000	The Exchange	Lee Naldoff	
2001	Orphan	Timmy Cummings	
2001	Scenes of the Crime	Arnon	
2002	Moonlight Mile	Pinky	
2003	Mystic River	Kevin Savage	
2006	The Departed	Frank Lazio	
2007	On Broadway	Kevin Sheehan	
2007	Gone Baby Gone	Interrogating Officer	
2009	Don McKay	Alfred	
2012	Contraband	John Bryce Farraday	
2014	The Equalizer	Detective Harris	
2019	City on a Hill	Bernie Hannahan, Detective	5 episodes
