= Paul Wahlberg =

American chef

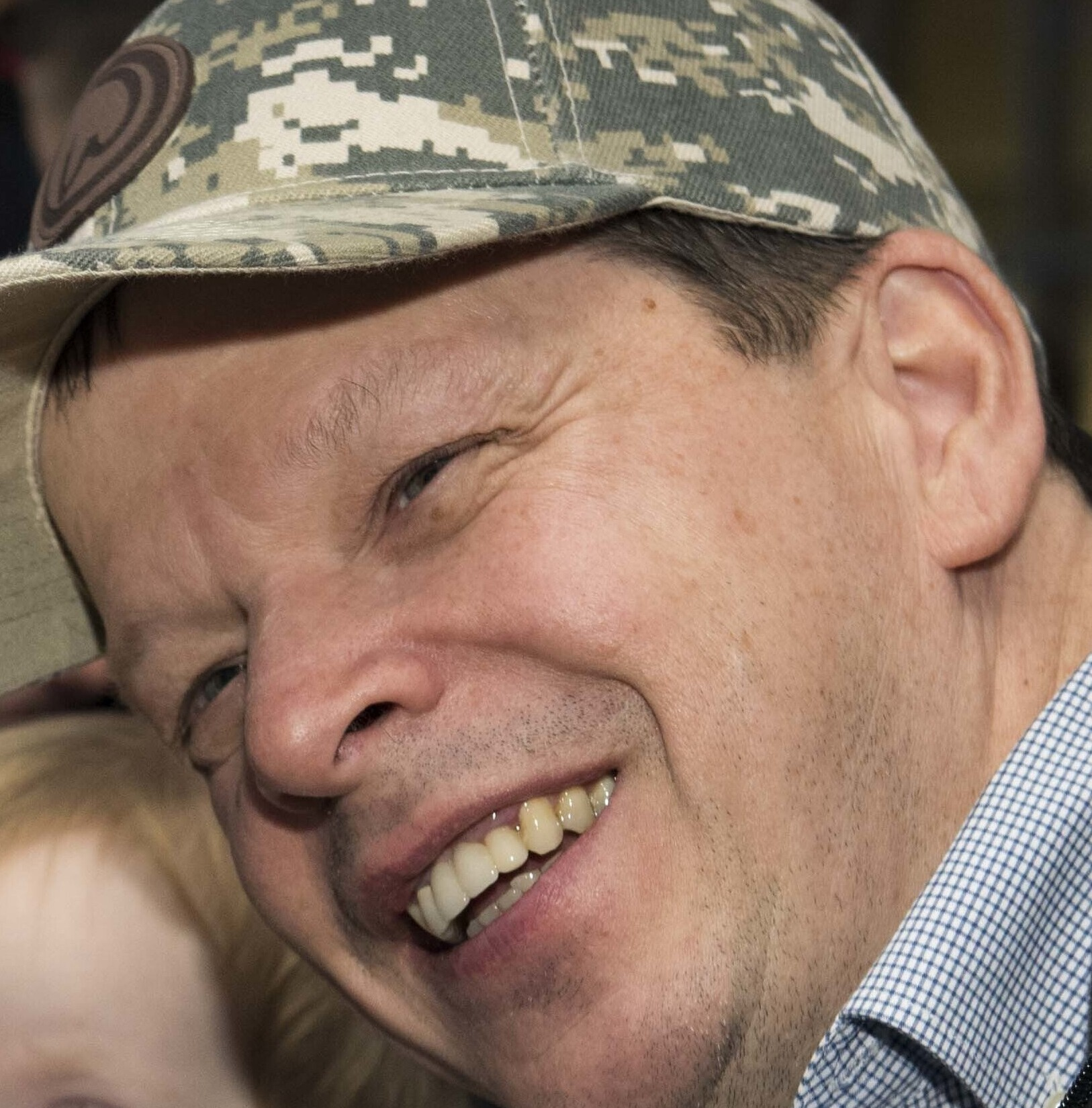
- Wahlberg in 2019
- Born: March 20, 1964 (age 62); Boston, Massachusetts, U.S.
- Occupations: Chef; television personality
- Years active: 1981–present
- Known for: Owner of Wahlburgers
- Children: 2
- Relatives: Mark Wahlberg (brother); Rhea Durham (sister-in-law); Donnie Wahlberg (brother); Jenny McCarthy (sister-in-law); Robert Wahlberg (brother); Jim Wahlberg (brother); Jeff Wahlberg (nephew)

Paul Wahlberg (born March 20, 1964) is an American chef and reality television personality. With his brothers Mark and Donnie, he runs the burger restaurant and bar Wahlburgers and starred in the reality television show of the same name, Wahlburgers.

== Background ==
Born in Boston to Alma (née Donnelly; 1942–2021) and Donald Wahlberg (1930–2008), he is the fourth of nine children and the first of his siblings to graduate from high school.

As a child, he was interested in watching cooking shows like The Galloping Gourmet. He decided to become a chef when he was 17.

== Career ==
Wahlberg found a love for the culinary industry working for Joseph's catering, run by the Calapa family of Braintree, Massachusetts. After high school, he worked at several restaurants, including The Charles Hotel, The Four Seasons and Bridgeman's in Hull, Massachusetts, where he served as executive chef for nine years.

== Personal life ==
Married, Wahlberg lives in Hingham, Massachusetts. He has two children.
