= Jeff Wahlberg =

American actor (born 1996)

- Wahlberg in 2026
- Born: July 17, 1996 (age 30); Boston, Massachusetts, U.S.
- Occupation: Actor
- Years active: 2012–present
- Height: 5'11
- Father: Jim Wahlberg
- Relatives: Paul Wahlberg (uncle); Robert Wahlberg (uncle); Donnie Wahlberg (uncle); Mark Wahlberg (uncle)

Jeff Wahlberg (born July 17, 1996) is an American actor.

Wahlberg is the son of Jim Wahlberg and the nephew of actors Mark Wahlberg and Donnie Wahlberg. His mother is Afro-Dominican and his father is Irish-American. Wahlberg was born in Boston but raised in Broward County, Florida.

== Filmography ==
=== Film ===
Year	Title	Role	Notes
2012	A Feeling from Within	James Scully	
2015	If Only	Isacc Diaz	Short film
2016	Toyed	Kerst	Short film
2017	Don't Come Back from the Moon	Mickey Smalley	
2018	Future World	Prince	
2019	Dora and the Lost City of Gold	Diego	
2021	Cherry	Jiminez	

=== Television ===
Year	Title	Role	Notes
2015	Instant Gratification	Peter	TV movie
2015	Ballers	Parking Attendant	1 episode
2018	Counterpart	Zeger	1 episode
2022	The Girl from Plainville	Rob Mahoney	Miniseries; 5 episodes
2026	Euphoria	Brandon Fontaine	3 episodes
