= Southie (film) =

- Theatrical release poster
- Directed by: John Shea
- Written by: Jimmy Cummings; Dave McLaughlin; John Shea
- Produced by: Bill McCutchen; Hugh Wilson; Merrill Holtzman
- Starring: Donnie Wahlberg; Rose McGowan; Lawrence Tierney; John Shea; James Cummings; Anne Meara; Will Arnett; Amanda Peet
- Cinematography: Allen Baker; Michael C. Butler
- Edited by: Tracy Granger
- Music by: Wayne Sharpe
- Distributed by: Lionsgate Films
- Release date: May 28, 1999
- Running time: 95 minutes
- Country: United States
- Language: English
- Budget: $1,200,000

Southie is a 1999 American crime thriller film directed by John Shea starring Donnie Wahlberg. It also stars Rose McGowan, Anne Meara, Jimmy Cummings, Lawrence Tierney, Robert Wahlberg, Will Arnett, Shea, and Amanda Peet. The film centers around Danny Quinn, a former "street kid" from South Boston, returning home to find his family deeper into organized crime than when he left, and his struggles not to fall back into his previous life.

== Plot ==
Danny Quinn (Donnie Wahlberg) is a former "street kid" from South Boston, colloquially known as "Southie," who returns home from New York City after three years away. He finds his mother (Anne Meara) overwhelmed with worry as her other three kids are caught up in the madness of the hardscrabble neighborhood in which drinking, sex, and fighting is the way of life. Danny tracks down his brothers only to find out they are deeply embedded in the Irish mob in Boston and in debt to local mobster Colie Powers (Lawrence Tierney). His younger sister Kathy (Rose McGowan), meanwhile, became a barfly in Danny's absence.

Danny must get his hands on some quick cash in order to stop his brothers from getting their legs broken and his sister off the streets. In his pursuit to help his ailing mother and right his family's name on the streets of Southie, Danny tracks down his old girlfriend from the neighborhood, Marianne (Amanda Peet), finding that the love he left behind still remains. She tells how she heard about the gunfight he was in with Joey Ward (Jimmy Cummings) and wants to know if that is why he left town. Danny confesses that real reason he left town was that he needed to stop drinking if he were to become the man that she would want him to be.

Unable to find legitimate work and banned from union jobs due to a scuffle at a wedding, Danny becomes desperate for money. Two of his old pals know Danny needs money and offer him an opportunity to be a partner in an underground gambling club, though, they neglect to tell Danny that their silent partner is his old nemesis, Joey Ward. It does not take long before Danny finds out and he and Joey are face to face. In Danny's absence from the neighborhood, Joey's father Butchie has declared war on Colie Powers and without knowing this Danny finds himself caught up in the middle of their war as it looks like he is in business with the Wards. The mob war eventually comes to Danny's front door, and the stress of an attempted murder in front of his house kills Danny's mother.

== Cast ==
- Donnie Wahlberg as Danny Quinn
- Rose McGowan as Kathy Quinn
- Robert Wahlberg as Davy Quinn
- Steven Kozlowski as Jimmy Quinn
- Anne Meara as Mrs. Quinn
- Lawrence Tierney as Colm 'Colie' Powers
- John Shea as Peter Binda
- David Fitzgerald as Francis 'Butchie' Ward
- Jimmy Cummings as Joey Ward
- Brian Goodman as Mikey 'Monk' Moriarty
- Lenny Clarke as Eddie 'Fat Eddie'
- Will Arnett as 'Whitey'
- Amanda Peet as Marianne Silva
- Janet Giannone as Peggy Silva
- Jere Shea as Martin Powers
- Katie MacIntosh as Clare Powers
- Josh Marchette as Will Casey
- Mannie Corrado as Jackie Porter
- Jeffery Cook as Chuckie Boyle
- Jay Giannone as Teddy Mac
- Mary Flavin as Desiree
- Sue Costello as Maureen 'Mo' Maloney
- Steve Sweeney as Paul Finnerty

== Production ==
Southie was written by two young screenwriters from Boston, Jimmy Cummings and Dave McLaughlin. It was originally entitled "Brass Ring".

The lead role was originally offered to Mark Wahlberg but he was not available following the success of the 1997 film Boogie Nights. Cummings' younger brother, Dan, suggested Donnie Wahlberg for the leading role. Shea spent a day with Ron Howard in New York as Howard completed the sound mixing on the 1996 film Ransom, in which Wahlberg had a supporting role. Shea liked what he saw and Wahlberg was offered the role.

Shooting was scheduled for February 1997, in the middle of a very cold and brutal Boston winter. The film was shot with a full union crew in twenty-four days.

The film ends as the real St. Patrick's Day parade goes through South Boston. The filmmakers were given permission by Thomas Menino, the Mayor of Boston, to shoot the parade. Directors of photography Allen Baker and Michael Bulter used five 35mm cameras to capture the Southie neighborhood.

After almost a year of post-production editing and scoring by composer Wayne Sharp, the filmmakers changed the film's name to Southie at the suggestion of Donnie Wahlberg. It was the first feature film ever shot entirely in the old South Boston neighborhood, a place once described as "the last white ghetto in America".

== Release ==
Southie was entered into the Seattle International Film Festival, the Nantucket Film Festival and the American Film Institute Festival in Los Angeles. The movie was acquired for distribution by Lions Gate Pictures after its screening at the Montreal World Film Festival where it was the only American film representing the United States in the main competition. In April 1999, it played at the 14th Dublin Film Festival.

== See also ==
- List of films, operas, and plays set in Boston
