= Boston's Finest =

- Genre: Reality
- Created by: Greg Berlanti
- Theme music composer: Dropkick Murphys
- Opening theme: "Out of Our Heads"
- Country of origin: United States
- Original language: English
- No. of seasons: 2
- No. of episodes: 14

Production
- Executive producers: Donnie Wahlberg; Julie Insogna-Jarrett; Seth Jarrett
- Running time: 40–43 minutes
- Production companies: Donnie D. Productions; Jarrett Creative Group; Warner Bros Television

Original release
- Network: TNT
- Release: February 27, 2013 – January 7, 2014

Boston's Finest is an American reality television series on TNT that chronicles the daily operations of the Boston Police Department. The series was green-lit on May 11, 2012, with the premiere on February 27, 2013. The television show received a second season renewal for six episodes in May 2013.

== Cast ==
The show followed officers of four different units of the Boston Police Department.

Gang Unit (Day)

- Manny Canuto
- Diamantino "D" Araujo
- Skye Robinson
- Robert "Twitch" Twitchell

Patrol Unit

- Jenn Penton
- Pat Rogers
- Tim Stanton

Gang Unit (Night)

- Terrique Chambers
- Greg McCormick

Fugitive Unit

- Sgt Ryan Mason
- Michelle Williams
- Brian Albert
- Winston DeLeon
- Greg Dankers
- Sean Joyce
- Sgt Mike Sullivan
- Joe Marerro
- Alison Fanelli
- Mike McHugh

== Episodes ==
Season	Episodes	Season premiere	Season finale
1	8	February 27, 2013	April 17, 2013
2	6	November 26, 2013	January 7, 2014

=== Season 1 (2013) ===
No. overall	No. in season	Title	Original release date	U.S. viewers (millions)
1	1	"Everything Is Personal"	February 27, 2013	1.21
After a stint in Afghanistan, Officer Jenn Penton patrols Boston with a rare intensity and sense of purpose – particularly when it comes to getting drugs off the street. Meanwhile, Greg Dankers and the Fugitive Unit search for a drug dealer convicted of selling crack cocaine and gun ammunition in a Roxbury school zone.
2	2	"The City They Call Home"	March 6, 2013	1.26
The officers of the Boston Police Department live in the city they are dedicated to protecting, working to balance fighting crime with finding time for family. For the department's Gang Unit, the target is a well-known figure whose capture becomes personal. Meanwhile, the Fugitive Unit cases the streets of Charlestown for a local suspect wanted on charges in New Hampshire. And on-duty Patrol Officers drive through the city streets, encountering an assortment of characters and challenges on every shift.
3	3	"Love Hurts"	March 13, 2013	1.00
The head of the police department's drug control unit decides there's only one way to stop the surge in drug violence plaguing South Boston: a massive raid on all the neighborhood’s biggest suspected dealers. It's a mission that will require tremendous manpower, careful planning, and perfect execution. Elsewhere, patrol officer Jenn Penton decides to try speed dating, despite her partner's skepticism.
4	4	"Calming the Storm"	March 20, 2013	1.04
In Dorchester, a string of gang-related shootings has the Boston Police Department on high alert. Things take a turn for the worse when a 20-year-old apparent gang member is shot execution-style in a local barbershop. With retaliation expected, the cops do everything they can to calm tensions and prevent another tragedy. Across town, the Fugitive Unit is on the trail of a dangerous knife-wielding robbery suspect.
5	5	"End of Days"	March 27, 2013	0.99
After more than a quarter century as a Boston cop and following a year filled with personal difficulties, Robert "Twitch" Twitchell is finally being promoted to Sergeant. Now, with just a week left as a detective in the gang unit, he's focused on bringing in one last perp. Meanwhile, it's a very different kind of week for Officer Myles Lawton with the approaching anniversary of the murder of his father, a former cop himself. The emotions are complicated by a frustrating Roxbury case in which the alleged shooter gets away, and no one seems to know anything about him.
6	6	"Family Matters"	April 3, 2013	0.85
It's been a little over a year since gang unit officer "D" Araujo found himself staring at the wrong end of a gun while chasing a suspect. The experience continues to stick with him, particularly as he teams up with the SWAT team to capture a suspect who's believed to be involved in a series of gun battles in Mattapan. Meanwhile, over on the fugitive unit, Greg Dankers works days tracking down criminals while his wife Nancy, also a cop, works nights. With twin boys at home, that doesn't leave many openings for date nights, but he hopes to find time to cook her dinner after work.
7	7	"Protecting Your Own"	April 10, 2013	0.60
Officer Terrique Chambers of the Night Gang Unit patrols the dangerous streets of Boston along with his team, Officer Lawton and Officer McCormick. He struggles with balancing his career and raising his two kids, one of whom has been diagnosed with autism. Meanwhile, Officer Ryan Mason and the Fugitive Unit attempt to apprehend a dangerous, wanted criminal who has threatened to shoot it out with the police. All of the units participate in the annual Fitness Challenge for bragging rights.
8	8	"Boston's Finest"	April 17, 2013	0.91
Officer Penton, one of the department's best patrol officers, is called upon day after day to solve one problem after another. But life doesn't always present issues that can be solved in short order. Her twin sister has been battling addiction for years. Now, after a few recent setbacks, she has reached out to Jenn for help. Meanwhile on the fugitive unit, Winston DeLeon and company are pursuing a rape suspect from a case dating back to 1992. And Manny Canuto and "D" Araujo of the gang unit find themselves assisting in another SWAT raid, continuing their unrelenting quest to get as many guns off the streets as possible.

=== Season 2 (2013–14) ===
No. overall	No. in season	Title	Original release date
9	1	"Boston Strong"	November 26, 2013
10	2	"No More Bullets"	December 3, 2013
11	3	"Brothers & Sisters"	December 10, 2013
12	4	"Fighting for the Truth"	December 17, 2013
13	5	"Protecting the Home"	December 24, 2013
14	6	"An Officer's Commitment to the End"	January 7, 2014

== Reception ==
Boston's Finest received generally favorable reviews, with a score of 75 on Metacritic. Allison Keene of The Hollywood Reporter notes that "fans of police procedurals will be drawn to the show's fly-on-the-wall feeling, with its engaging cases and easy flow of law enforcement lingo. Though Boston's Finest hints at the darkest corners of American street life, its real aim seems to be a showcase of local heroism."

The Boston Globe's Matthew Gilbert criticized the show for its lack of action, stating "Boston's Finest may be too aimless and pointless to inspire loyal viewing. It can be a little dull over the long haul, perhaps because the action we see isn’t particularly interesting and the family lives of the cops are relatively incident-free." Gilbert also praised the show for its focus on the personal lives of the officers themselves, "The one subplot in Boston's Finest that resonates most of all belongs to Officer Penton, who has a personal reason for her interest in drug arrests... We get a clear and touching sense of how Penton's family situation fuels her professional life, and how inspiration and greatness can be born of pain."
