= Good for Me =

Good for Me may refer to:

- Good for Me (album), by The Swellers
- "Good for Me" (song), a 1992 song by Amy Grant
- "Good for Me", a song by Kirsty MacColl on the album Tropical Brainstorm
- "Good for Me", a song by Above & Beyond on the album Tri-State
- "Good for Me", a song by Medicine on the album The Mechanical Forces of Love
- "Good for Me", a song by Bob Seger & The Silver Bullet Band from the album Against the Wind
- "Good for Me", a song by Richie Kotzen from the album Change
- "Good for Me", a song by Trin-i-tee 5:7 from the album 7

== See also ==
- Good For You (disambiguation)
