= Wahlburgers =

American burger restaurant chain

Wahlburgers Franchising LLC

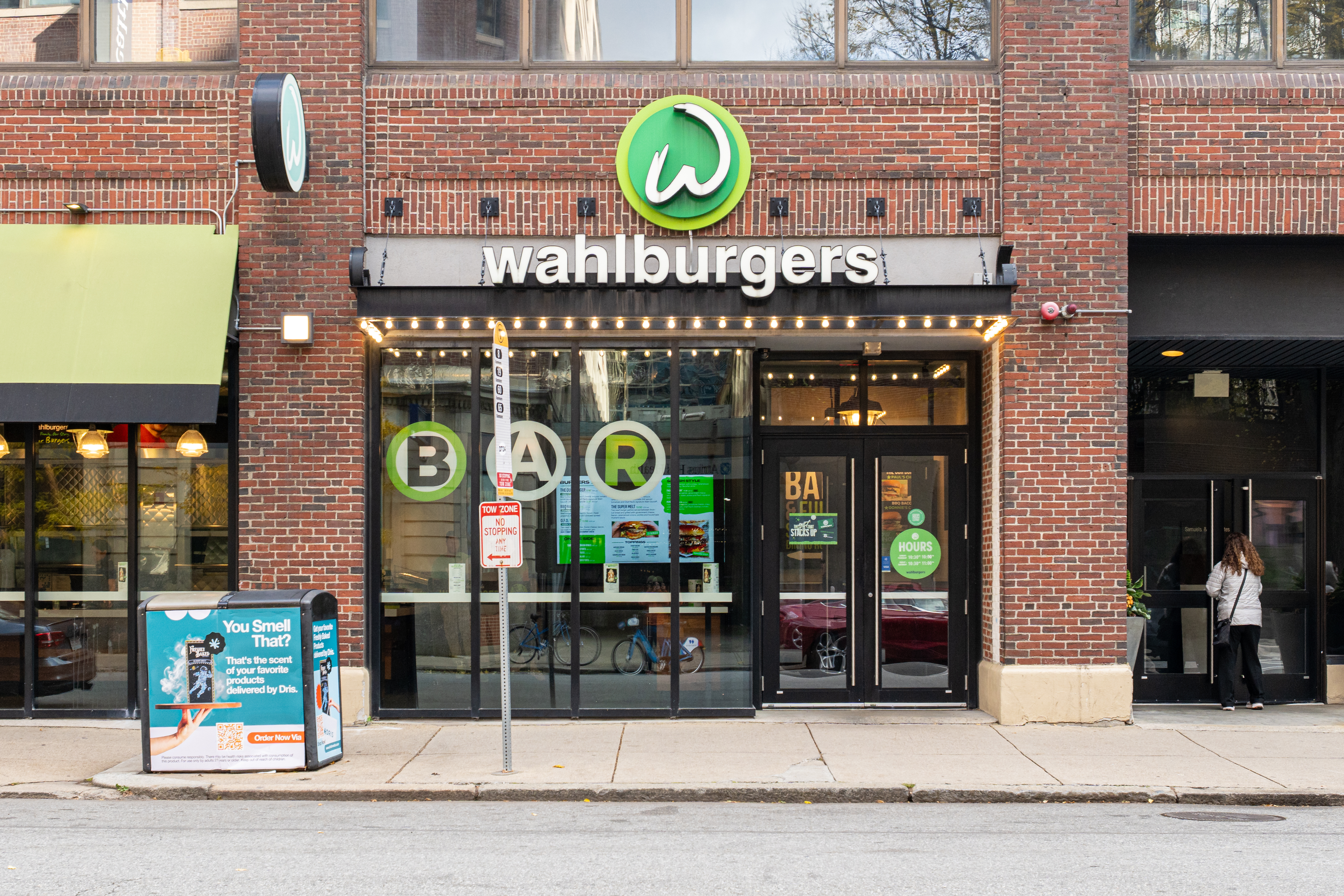
- Restaurant in Boston
- Trade name: Wahlburgers
- Type: Private
- Industry: Food service
- Genre: Casual dining
- Founded: 2011 (15 years ago) in Hingham, Massachusetts
- Founders: Paul Wahlberg; Donnie Wahlberg; Mark Wahlberg
- Headquarters: Hingham, Massachusetts
- Number of locations: 32 (2025)
- Area served: United States; Canada; Australia; New Zealand
- Key people: Paul Wahlberg (founder); Randy Sharpe (CEO)
- Products: French fries, Hamburgers, sandwiches, hot dogs, salads, cocktails, desserts and merchandise
- Services: Restaurant, bar and take-out
- Revenue: ▲US$105 million (FY February 25, 2021)
- Website: wahlburgers.com

Wahlburgers (stylized as wahlburgers) is a casual dining burger restaurant and bar chain. It is owned by chef Paul Wahlberg and his brothers, actors Donnie and Mark. As of July 2025, there are 32 Wahlburgers locations in the United States, Canada, Australia and New Zealand, reduced from 109 locations in 2023. The company previously had a restaurant in London. The company also operates a few food trucks in the US.

The chain was the subject of the television series Wahlburgers, which debuted on A&E in 2014 and aired for 10 seasons over five years.

== History ==
In 2011, an equity group that includes Paul Wahlberg, Donnie Wahlberg, and Mark Wahlberg licensed the name "Wahlburger" from Tom Wahl's for use in their own restaurant. The family also owns and operates another restaurant named Alma Nove, which opened prior to Wahlburgers. Its name is derived from the name of the brothers' mother and the fact that she had nine children ("nove" being Italian for nine). The first Wahlburgers opened in Hingham, Massachusetts, near Alma Nove, the pre-existing restaurant operated by Paul Wahlberg.

Because of the success of the restaurant, a reality television series Wahlburgers was launched on January 22, 2014, on A&E. In 2014, Wahlburgers received an Emmy nomination for Outstanding Unstructured Reality Program. The show concluded in 2019 after 10 seasons.

A second location opened in Toronto, Ontario, on November 15, 2014, after a soft launch earlier in the month.

On February 18, 2016, an Orlando, Florida, location held its red carpet grand opening. Chef Paul and Mark were in attendance. Wahlburgers announced its first South Carolina location in 2016, at Myrtle Beach's Broadway at the Beach with three more Carolinas locations planned owned by franchiser Greg Pranzo. The Raleigh location opened in May 2018 and closed seven months later with the sheriff padlocking the doors and referring inquiries to the landlord with reports of bounced paychecks. Work on a planned location in South Charlotte had stopped as of early December 2018 according to media reports.

In January 2017, Wahlburgers announced a joint venture with the Cachet Hospitality Group and businessman Farooq Arjomand to expand the Wahlburgers chain into Asia. The expansion plan was to open 100 restaurants in China and the surrounding region over the following five years. The deal later fell through.

In December 2017, Wahlburgers and superstore chain Meijer announced a partnership to bring Wahlburgers restaurants to Meijer stores in Michigan and Ohio.

Wahlburgers opened their first location on the Upper East Side of Manhattan with a franchisee in May 2017. In October 2018, the restaurant was closed by the New York City Department of Health for failing to comply with health code regulations. The restaurant was permanently closed the next month. A Coney Island location operated seasonally in 2017 and 2018. In December 2017, two Wahlburgers restaurants opened in Los Angeles. Prior to the opening, part owner Mark Wahlberg applied to have assault crimes on his record pardoned; in his application he stated that his primary reason for seeking the pardon was to pursue a concessionaire's license in California as part of his effort to bring Wahlburgers to the state. He later dropped the application.

Prior on May 22, 2018, Wahlburgers opened a location in the Mall of America in Bloomington, Minnesota, the first of 26 restaurants planned as part of a franchising deal with grocery chain Hy-Vee that will also bring Wahlburgers entrées and drinks to some Hy-Vee in-store restaurants. On September 25, 2018, Wahlburgers opened in Olathe, Kansas, to a large crowd with a surprise visit from Paul Wahlberg.

In April 2018, Wahlburgers agreed to market their fresh Angus brisket, chuck, and short rib blend hamburger patties in supermarkets. ARKK Food will distribute the burgers in more than 1,300 stores, including Shaw's. In June 2018, the company announced CEO Rick Vanzura would be leaving the chain. He was succeeded by John Fuller who was previously CEO at Johnny Rockets and the Coffee Bean & Tea Leaf.

In May 2019, Wahlburgers opened a restaurant in Covent Garden, London, its first location in the United Kingdom. The company was planning to open 15 restaurants over five years in London and other cities. In mid-2020, the company permanently closed the Covent Garden restaurant, citing the financial impact of the COVID-19 pandemic and the store's location as the reasons for the closure. In January 2020, the first Wahlburgers in Germany opened at Ramstein Air Base. That location closed on December 28, 2022. On February 17, 2022, Wahlburgers opened their first store in Australia in Sydney. A Wahlburgers in Surfers Paradise, Queensland opened in Australia in late 2022.

In 2024, multiple Wahlburgers locations closed, including one at The Battery Atlanta adjacent to Truist Park, with the company pulling out of the Atlanta, Huntsville, and Indianapolis markets. The 79 Wahlburgers locations that were part of the Hy-Vee partnership closed in early 2025, reducing the chain to approximately 32 locations globally. In 2026, five of its six Australian locations closed.
