= GFU =

GFU may refer to:

- George Fox University, a private Christian university in Newberg, Oregon, United States
- Greenfield University, a private university in Kaduna, Nigeria
- "GFU", a 2021 song by Yak Gotti and Sheck Wes featuring Yung Kayo from Slime Language 2
- "GFU", a 2025 song by Tyga from NSFW
