= Future World (film) =

2018 American science fiction action film

- Theatrical release poster
- Directed by: James Franco; Bruce Thierry Cheung
- Written by: Bruce Thierry Cheung; Jay Davis
- Produced by: Monika Bacardi; Jay Davis; James Franco; Andrea Iervolino; Vince Jolivette; Scott Reed; Jean-Alexandre Luciani; Julien Favre
- Starring: James Franco; Suki Waterhouse; Jeffrey Wahlberg; Margarita Levieva; Snoop Dogg; Twin Shadow; Method Man; Lucy Liu; Milla Jovovich
- Cinematography: Peter Zeitlinger
- Edited by: Alex Freitas; William Paley
- Music by: Toydrum
- Production companies: Grindstone Entertainment Group; AMBI Group; Black Sparrow Films; Dark Rabbit Productions
- Distributed by: Lionsgate Premiere
- Release date: May 25, 2018 (United States)
- Running time: 90 minutes
- Country: United States
- Language: English
- Box office: $163,313

Future World is a 2018 American direct-to-video science fiction action Western film, co-produced and directed by James Franco and co-directed by Bruce Thierry Cheung, who wrote the script alongside Jay Davis. It stars Franco, Suki Waterhouse, Jeffrey Wahlberg, Margarita Levieva, Snoop Dogg, Twin Shadow, Method Man, Lucy Liu and Milla Jovovich.

The film was released on May 25, 2018, by Lionsgate Premiere.

== Plot ==
Mankind's technological breakthroughs in the development of artificial intelligence and robotics eventually lead to a global war. Afterward, the remnants of humanity struggle to survive in a post-apocalyptic wasteland while the surviving machines remain hidden.

In the wasteland, the Warlord raids a settlement that contains a high-tech lab with Ash, an android girl. The Warlord activates Ash, who opens two different colored eyes, one blue, one green that, light up when she receives commands through a handheld remote control.

Elsewhere, in the Oasis, a fertile zone, a young man called the Prince sets out on a mission into the wasteland in search of medicine to help his sick mother the Queen. His only clue to finding it is a faded postcard of a place called Paradise Beach where the rumored cure can be found.

The Prince and his friends who accompany him stop at Love Town, a wasteland settlement that deals in sex slaves and is run by the pimp Big Daddy Love Lord. The group tries to get directions to Paradise Beach, but they attract the attention of the Raiders. The Prince's friend Rico drives off the Raiders with a handgun - a rare and valuable item in the wasteland. Big Daddy approaches with an offer to meet with someone who can help them, but this is a trap set up, by the Warlord where Ash captures the Prince and kills his friends. The Warlord then forces the Prince into taking them back to the Oasis, during which Ash, who knows the Warlord will kill everyone, decides to save him.

Ash is damaged during the escape, but she and the Prince manage to find shelter before her systems shut down. The next day, the Prince fashions a stretcher and drags Ash's body through the wasteland. He arrives at the ocean, where his hopes are shattered when they are taken prisoner again by another group of wastelanders residing in the ruins of the seaside resort. At the resort, the Prince meets the Drug Lord, who offers him the cure he seeks, but at a cost. She injects him which causes him to hallucinate before becoming unconscious. Ash is taken to Lei, a mechanic and a prisoner of the Drug Lord, who repairs Ash and reactivates her. Afterward, Ash is taken before the Drug Lord who fawns over how valuable she is.

The next day, the Drug Lord forces the Prince into a gladiatorial battle with one of her minions. She declares that if he survives, he gets the medicine and goes free. The Prince manages to defeat his opponent and retrieves the drugs, but the Drug Lord says that Ash is staying with her.

Later that evening, Lei goes to free Ash who is chained in a cell, but her attempt to saw the chains proves futile. Ash accepts her fate to remain a prisoner. Lei kisses her, but then draws away, thinking it's wrong to take advantage of Ash. But Ash returns her affection. The next morning, the Drug Lord discovers Ash and Lei together and, in a jealous rage, orders Lei to wipe Ash's memory of the event and reprogram her into a loving companion for herself instead.

Outside, the Prince returns and tries to sneak into the resort just as the Warlord arrives and attacks the complex. In a drug-addled fury, the Drug Lord faces off with the Warlord who ends up killing her with the Prince's handgun. During the distraction, the Prince tries to help Lei and Ash escape, but they are all captured. The Warlord tries to retake control of Ash with the remote, ordering her to kill her friends, but Ash kills his men instead. She stabs the Warlord with a machete and escapes with Lei and the Prince on a pair of the Raider's motorbikes. The Warlord gives chase, but Ash stops and kills him in one last stand.

The three eventually make it back to Oasis. Ash informs the Prince she is leaving to find others like herself. The Prince returns to the Queen and gives her the medicine as Ash rides off with Lei into the wasteland. In a mid-credits post scene, Ash returns to Love Town and frees the sex slaves, who attack Big Daddy Love Lord as revenge for his treatment of them.

== Cast ==
- James Franco as Warlord
- Suki Waterhouse as Ash
- Jeffrey Wahlberg as Prince
- Margarita Levieva as Lei
- Snoop Dogg as Big Daddy Love Lord
- Twin Shadow as Ratcatcher
- Method Man as Tattooed Face
- Lucy Liu as Queen
- Milla Jovovich as Drug Lord
- Carmen Argenziano as Grandfather
- Scott Haze as Gutter
- Wilmer Calderon as Skinny
- Rumer Willis as Rosie
- Elisha Henig as Grandson
- Tamzin Brown as Sweet Tea

== Production ==
In May 2016, it was announced James Franco, Milla Jovovich, Twin Shadow and Margarita Levieva joined the cast of the film, with Franco directing alongside Bruce Thierry Cheung, with Dark Rabbit Productions and AMBI Group, financing the film, with Monika Bacardi, Vince Jolivette and Jay Davis producing. That same month, Lucy Liu, Method Man, Suki Waterhouse, Jeffrey Wahlberg and Snoop Dogg joined the cast of the film. Principal photography began in May 2016, and wrapped in June 2016.

== Release ==
It was released on May 25, 2018, by Lionsgate Premiere. The film was released through DVD and Blu-ray on July 10, 2018, by Lionsgate Home Entertainment.

== Critical reception ==
Future World was panned by film critics. It holds a 0% approval rating on review aggregator website Rotten Tomatoes, based on nine reviews, with an average of 1.7/10. On Metacritic, the film holds a rating of 10 out of 100, based on 4 critics, indicating "overwhelming dislike".

Frank Scheck of The Hollywood Reporter gave the film a negative review writing: "A low-rent, post-apocalyptic sci-fi tale that doesn't succeed as either homage or parody of such obvious inspirations as the Mad Max series, Future World proves as original as its title". Ignatiy Vishnevetsky of The A.V. Club also gave the film a negative review writing: "Franco and Cheung's unorthodox approach of directing almost the entire film in random, nomadic Steadicam shots with wobbly zooms alienates the simplistic plot".
