= Robert Roche (businessman) =

American businessman (born 1962)

Robert Walter Roche
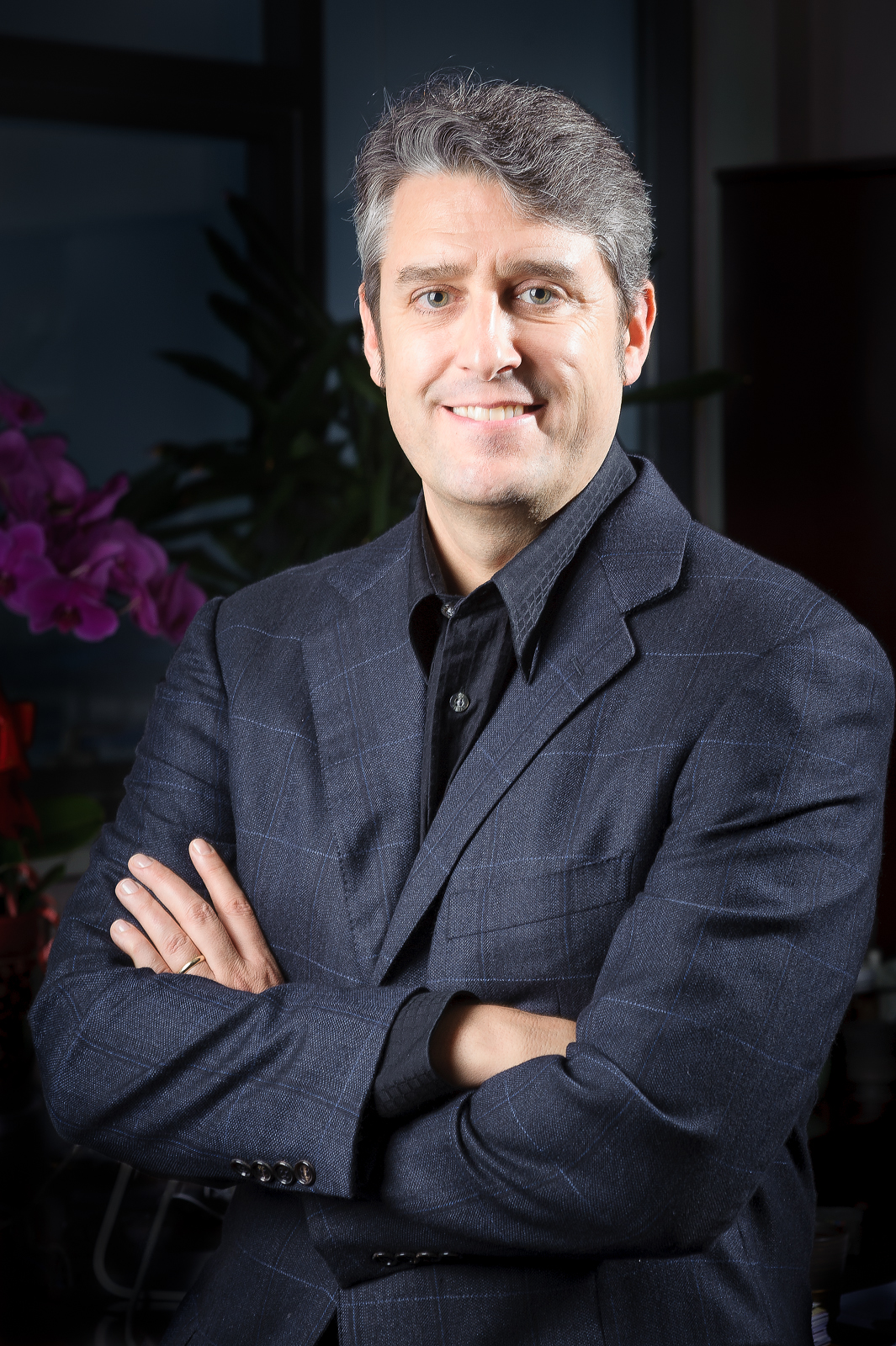
- Born: December 7, 1962 (age 63); Oak Lawn, Illinois, U.S.
- Education: Illinois State University, University of Denver
- Occupation: International Entrepreneur

Robert Walter Roche is an American entrepreneur and philanthropist active in the U.S., China and Japan.

== Early life ==
Roche grew up outside of Chicago, Illinois. He received his bachelor's degree in Economics and Japanese Studies from Illinois State University in 1985 and a J.D. degree from the University of Denver Sturm College of Law in 1988.

== Career ==
=== Business ===
Robert Roche is the co-founder and Executive Chairman of Acorn International Inc., a media and branding direct sales company based in Shanghai, China. He is also the co-founder, Executive Chairman, and President of Oak Lawn Marketing, Inc., a Japan-based company that engages in the TV home shopping business. Roche founded Oak Lawn Marketing in 1993 and helped it to become one of Japan’s major infomercial and direct marketing companies. NTT DoCoMo, Japan’s dominant mobile carrier, acquired a 51% stake in the company in 2009.

In 2013, Roche co-founded IS Seafood, a company that imports Icelandic fish to China. and also co-founded Cachet Hotel Group. The company is based in Hong Kong and was created with a focus on "building new distinctive hotel brands." Under Roche, in 2014, Cachet acquired URBN Hotel in Shanghai and JIA Shanghai. Roche developed an award-winning golf and residential community in Hurricane, Utah. and is developing a carbon-neutral manufacturing complex in Gallup, New Mexico.

=== Civic ===
Roche is a member of the American Chamber of Commerce in Shanghai and served as Chairman in 2010. He was also a member of the Board of Governors of the American Chamber of Commerce in Japan.

In September 2010, Roche was appointed by President Barack Obama as a member of the Advisory Committee for Trade Policy and Negotiations.

Roche co-founded and serves on the board of trustees of Business Forward, an organization of business leaders that advise politicians on ways to accelerate the economy. He also serves on the board of advisors of the Center for New American Security and is Vice Chairman of the Quad Investors Network, a non-profit that facilitates investments, joint ventures, and licensing in emerging technologies across the Indo-Pacific.

== Philanthropy ==
In 2005, Roche endowed a chair at Nanzan Institute for Religion and Culture in Nagoya, Japan, establishing The Roche Chair for Interreligious Research.

Roche founded the Roche Family Foundation, which has supported organizations like U.S.-China Strong, an organization that works to strengthen U.S.-China relations through youth education and exchange programs.

In 2010, he made a joint gift with the Roche Family Foundation of $3 million to the University of Denver Sturm College of Law to establish the Roche Family International Business Transactions Program.

Starting in 1991, Robert became one of the organizers of the American Business Community Nagoya (ABCN), which later became the Chubu Chapter of the American Chamber of Commerce Japan (ACCJ), and initiated the Nagoya Walkathon and International Charity Festival. Roche has served as a trustee for the Center for American Progress and was listed as a supporter under the $100,000 to $499,999 category. He also served on the board of directors of Cara Chicago.

During 2010, Roche joined the board of Americans Promoting Study Abroad.

== Family ==
He and his wife, Ritsuko Hattori, have three children: Eddie, Yurina and Bobby.
