= The Right Combination (song) =

1990 single by Seiko and Donnie Wahlberg

Single by Seiko and Donnie Wahlberg

from the album Seiko
- B-side: "Goodbye My Baby"
- Released: June 1990
- Length: 4:59
- Label: CBS/Sony; Columbia
- Songwriters: Michael Jay; Michael Cruz
- Producer: Maurice Starr

"The Right Combination" is a song by Japanese pop star Seiko and American pop singer Donnie Wahlberg. The song was released in June 1990 and peaked at number 54 in the United States, number two in Canada, and number 44 in the United Kingdom. It also peaked at number 11 in Australia, where it was certified gold.

== Track listing ==
CD single

No.	Title	Length
1.	"The Right Combination"	4:26
2.	"Goodbye My Baby" (Seiko solo)	4:00

== Charts ==
=== Weekly charts ===
Chart (1990)	Peak position
Australia (ARIA)	11
Canada Retail Singles (The Record)	2
Canada Top Singles (RPM)	48
UK Singles (Official Charts)	44
US Billboard Hot 100	54

=== Year-end charts ===
Chart (1990)	Position
Australia (ARIA)	59

== Certifications ==
Region	Certification	Certified units/sales
Australia (ARIA)	Gold	35,000^{^}
^{^} Shipments figures based on certification alone.
