= Journey Forward =

US non-profit organization

Journey Forward is a 501(c)(3) non-profit organization outside of Boston, Massachusetts, in the city of Canton, Massachusetts, dedicated to improving the lives of those who have suffered paralysis through a spinal cord injury with exercise programs.

Journey Forward was founded by Dan Cummings, a C6 quadriplegic who regained the ability to walk, in June 2008.

== Mission ==
Journey Forward is dedicated to improving the lives of those who have suffered a spinal cord injury through an intense exercise program.
