= Donnie Wahlberg =

American singer and actor (born 1969)

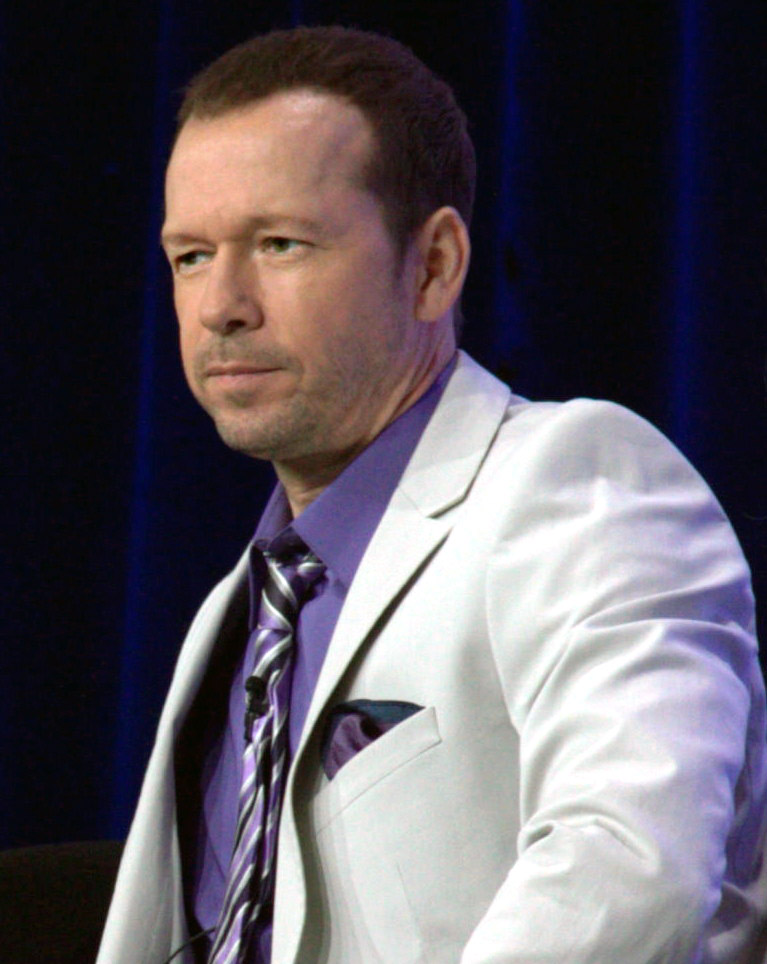
- Wahlberg in 2010
- Born: Donald Edmond Wahlberg Jr. August 17, 1969 (age 57); Boston, Massachusetts, U.S.
- Occupations: Singer; songwriter; actor; producer
- Years active: 1984–present
- Spouses: Kim Fey (m. 1999; div. 2008) Jenny McCarthy (m. 2014)
- Children: 2
- Relatives: Mark Wahlberg (brother); Rhea Durham (sister-in-law); Robert Wahlberg (brother); Jim Wahlberg (brother); Paul Wahlberg (brother); Jeff Wahlberg (nephew)
- Musical career
- Genres: Pop; hip hop; blue-eyed soul
- Instrument: Vocals
- Labels: Columbia; Interscope
- Member of: New Kids on the Block
- Formerly of: NKOTBSB

Donald Edmond Wahlberg Jr. (born August 17, 1969) is an American singer, actor, and producer. He is a founding member of the boy band New Kids on the Block. He has starred in the TV drama series Blue Bloods and Boston Blue as NYPD and later Boston Police Department Detective Danny Reagan and has had roles in the Saw films, Zookeeper (2011), Dreamcatcher (2003), The Sixth Sense (1999), Righteous Kill (2008), and Ransom (1996), as well as the role of Carwood Lipton in the World War II miniseries Band of Brothers.

From 2002 to 2003, he starred in the crime drama Boomtown. He was also an executive producer of the TNT reality television show Boston's Finest (2013). He was nominated for Choice Scream at the 2006 Teen Choice Awards for his work in the Saw films. He has also produced and starred in Rock This Boat, Donnie Loves Jenny and Return of the Mac on Pop TV. Wahlberg also produced and starred in the A&E reality series Wahlburgers, which earned him two Primetime Emmy Award nominations. He is the older brother of actor Mark Wahlberg and younger brother of actor Robert Wahlberg, film producer Jim Wahlberg, and chef Paul Wahlberg.

== Early life ==
Wahlberg was born in the Dorchester neighborhood of Boston. He is the eighth of nine children, with older siblings, Arthur, Jim, Paul, Robert, Tracey, Michelle, Debbie and younger brother, Mark. Wahlberg began his entertainment career as the leader of the late 1980s/early 1990s boy band, New Kids on the Block. He also has three half-siblings from his father's first marriage: Donna, Scott and Buddy. His mother, Alma Elaine (née Donnelly), was a bank clerk and nurse's aide who died on April 19, 2021, and his father, Donald Edmond Wahlberg, who died in 2008, was a teamster who worked as a delivery driver; they divorced in 1982. His father was of Swedish and Irish descent, and his mother was of Irish, English, and French-Canadian ancestry. Wahlberg has described his family as having an Irish-Catholic background. He said his first job was in the foreign-exchange office of a bank.

== Career ==
=== New Kids on the Block ===
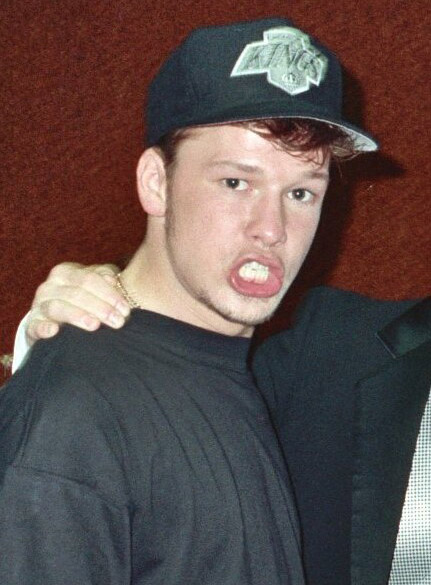
Wahlberg in 1990

As a recording artist, Wahlberg is known as an original member of the boy band New Kids on the Block. The band, which was put together by Maurice Starr and Mary Alford to create a "white counterpart" to New Edition, first found Wahlberg, age 15, and made him the first member of the band after hearing his rapping skills. His brother Mark was also in it but left after a few months. With the additions of Jonathan and Jordan Knight, Danny Wood and Joey McIntyre, they became known as New Kids on the Block.

After ten years, they announced their break up in 1994. In April 2008, Wahlberg confirmed to CNN that NKOTB were planning on recording and starting up a new tour. Their first album as a reunited group, The Block, was released in September 2008, and topped American charts and was certified gold. The group's reunion tour, New Kids on the Block: Live, began at Toronto's Air Canada Centre on September 18, 2008. As of 2024, NKOTB still tour and Wahlberg remains a member.

=== Film and TV career ===
Wahlberg's first film acting role was in the 1996 film Bullet with Mickey Rourke and Tupac Shakur. Also in 1996, he appeared as a kidnapper in Ransom with Mel Gibson. He went back to his home town for a starring role in the South Boston-based film Southie. Wahlberg received attention for his role in the 1999 film The Sixth Sense, playing the patient of Bruce Willis' character in the opening sequence.

In 2001, Wahlberg co-starred as Second Lieutenant C. Carwood Lipton in the television miniseries Band of Brothers. He also starred in the 2002–2003 NBC drama series Boomtown as Joel Stevens, a Los Angeles police detective. Graham Yost, executive producer and writer of Boomtown, had worked with him in Band of Brothers and was so impressed by his performance that he wrote the role of Joel Stevens specifically for him.

In 2003, Wahlberg starred alongside Timothy Olyphant, Jason Lee, and his Band of Brothers co-star Damian Lewis as the mentally challenged Duddits in William Goldman and Lawrence Kasdan's adaptation of the Stephen King alien-invasion thriller, Dreamcatcher. In 2005, he starred as Detective Eric Matthews in the second installment of the Saw series. He reprised the role in Saw III in 2006 and Saw IV in 2007, also appearing in Saw V in 2008 via archive footage from the previous films.

In 2006, Wahlberg played Lieutenant Commander Burton in the military/boxing drama Annapolis. In September 2006, he played the lead role in the short-lived television drama Runaway on The CW. The show was canceled in October 2006 due to poor ratings. In 2007, he starred in the television film Kings of South Beach on A&E. Also in 2007, he starred on the TV series The Kill Point.

In 2008, Wahlberg appeared in Righteous Kill and co-starred in What Doesn't Kill You.

From 2010 to 2024, Wahlberg starred as 1st Grade Detective Danny Reagan on CBS's Blue Bloods, a police drama set in New York City. In an interview, he said he was drawn to the Blue Bloods role after his experience playing an NYPD detective in a 2005 NBC TV pilot NY70 set in the 1970s that was not picked up. He also previously worked with Blue Bloods co-star Bridget Moynahan on an unsuccessful 2008 TNT pilot called Bunker Hill (originally titled Morse Code), and encouraged her to take the role as his sister on Blue Bloods. He directed an episode in the show's fourth season.

He has said he considers himself a character actor rather than a "movie star" like his brother.

As of 2011, Wahlberg is the host of an internet radio show on Friday nights at 8 pm PST called "DDUB's R&B Back Rub" on Cherry Tree Radio and appeared in the 2011 comedy Zookeeper.

Wahlberg is the current host of the documentary series Very Scary People since 2019, the broadcast of which moved from HLN to Investigation Discovery in 2023.

In November 2016, it was reported that he was a co-producer on a CBS comedy in early development about a boy band reuniting after 20 years.

In 2021, Wahlberg worked on season five of The Masked Singer as the rooster "Cluedle-Doo" who gave exclusive clues to the viewers. After performing Mark Morrison's "Return of the Mack" in the semi-finals, Wahlberg was unmasked. He even stuck around when Omarion was unmasked as the wild card contestant "Yeti".

In 2022, he sold two TV police drama projects as an executive producer to CBS Studios as part of an overall deal with the studio, Harbor Blue and Samaritan, though neither had entered production as of 2024. Earlier that year, the production company Work Baby Productions he formed together with his wife to develop unscripted, reality and documentary content signed a three-year first-look deal with Lionsgate, including a partnership with Pilgrim Media Group.

In 2024 he was featured in the Paramount Plus documentary Larger Than Life: Reign of the Boybands and the following year in 2025 in the HBO documentary series Celtics City as well as in the ESPN series Believers about the Boston Red Sox.

In the fall of 2025, after Blue Bloods ended, Wahlberg reprised his roll as Det. Danny Reagan in the hit-TV police drama Boston Blue. Set in the Boston, Massachusetts, area, he comes to the aid of his son Sean after he is critically injured on the job at the Boston Police Department, and follows his life moving to Boston to be close to his son.

== Personal life ==
In 1991, Wahlberg was charged with first-degree arson for setting a fire at the historic Seelbach Hotel in Louisville, Kentucky. Authorities stated that Wahlberg, then known as the "bad boy" of boy band New Kids on the Block, was partying with fellow band member Danny Wood and fans in the early morning hours when Wahlberg dumped vodka on a hallway carpet and ignited it. Wahlberg was facing up to 20 years in prison, but the charge was later reduced to misdemeanor criminal mischief, and eventually dismissed after Wahlberg agreed to appear in public-service videos addressing fire safety, drug abuse and drunk driving.

Wahlberg married Kimberly Fey on August 20, 1999, with whom he has two sons. They filed for divorce on August 13, 2008, citing irreconcilable differences. In July 2013, Us Weekly reported that he was dating actress Jenny McCarthy after meeting on Watch What Happens Live in March. They announced their engagement on The View on April 16, 2014, and wed on August 31, 2014, at the Hotel Baker in St. Charles, Illinois, where had moved to from outside New York. In 2015, Wahlberg joined the board of directors of Generation Rescue, McCarthy's anti-vaccination nonprofit is known promoting misinformation regarding the safety of vaccines. Claming vaccines cause autism and promoting pseudoscientific cures and treatments for autism. He continued to sit on the organization's board until its formal dissolution in December 2019. Wahlberg held concerts to raise money for Generation Rescue in 2016 and 2017 (raising a combined total of approximately $1.5 million); part of the money was earmarked to help build an "integrative health clinic," a project that was eventually abandoned. In 2017, Wahlberg and McCarthy appeared together at Generation Rescue's Autism Education Summit, as well as in a promotional video for the organization thanking Wahlberg's fans for their support. Wahlberg participated in a celebrity poker tournament benefiting Generation Rescue in March 2019.

Wahlberg is a fan of the Boston Celtics and has been seen attending many of their games. He narrated The Association: Boston Celtics, a documentary about the team's 2010 season, and co-narrated, alongside Ice Cube, the ESPN 30 for 30 documentary Celtics/Lakers: Best of Enemies, about the Celtics' rivalry with the Los Angeles Lakers. He co-owns a line of restaurants, Wahlburgers, located in Boston, MA and St. Charles, IL with brothers Paul and Mark. In December 2024 he delivered a weather report on the Los Angeles TV station KTLA and was described as being "obsessed with weather."

In May 2025 he was inducted in to the Alumni Hall of Fame of the Boys & Girls Clubs of America. In October 2025 he received a lifetime achievement award from the Boston Arts Academy foundation.

He has said he makes an effort to engage with fans on social media and in person. Blue Bloods co-star Will Estes has called him "one of the most engaging people I've ever seen with his fans."

=== Political views ===
In February 2016, Wahlberg endorsed Republican candidate Marco Rubio for president of the United States, but later said the decision had been "tough" because "we have a lot of things we don't agree on." On the prospect of Donald Trump as president, he commented, "We can blame the president, we can blame the government, but we also have to look at ourselves if we vote with emotion, which we're on the verge of doing again collectively, the angry vote is what is moving the meters right now."

== Discography ==
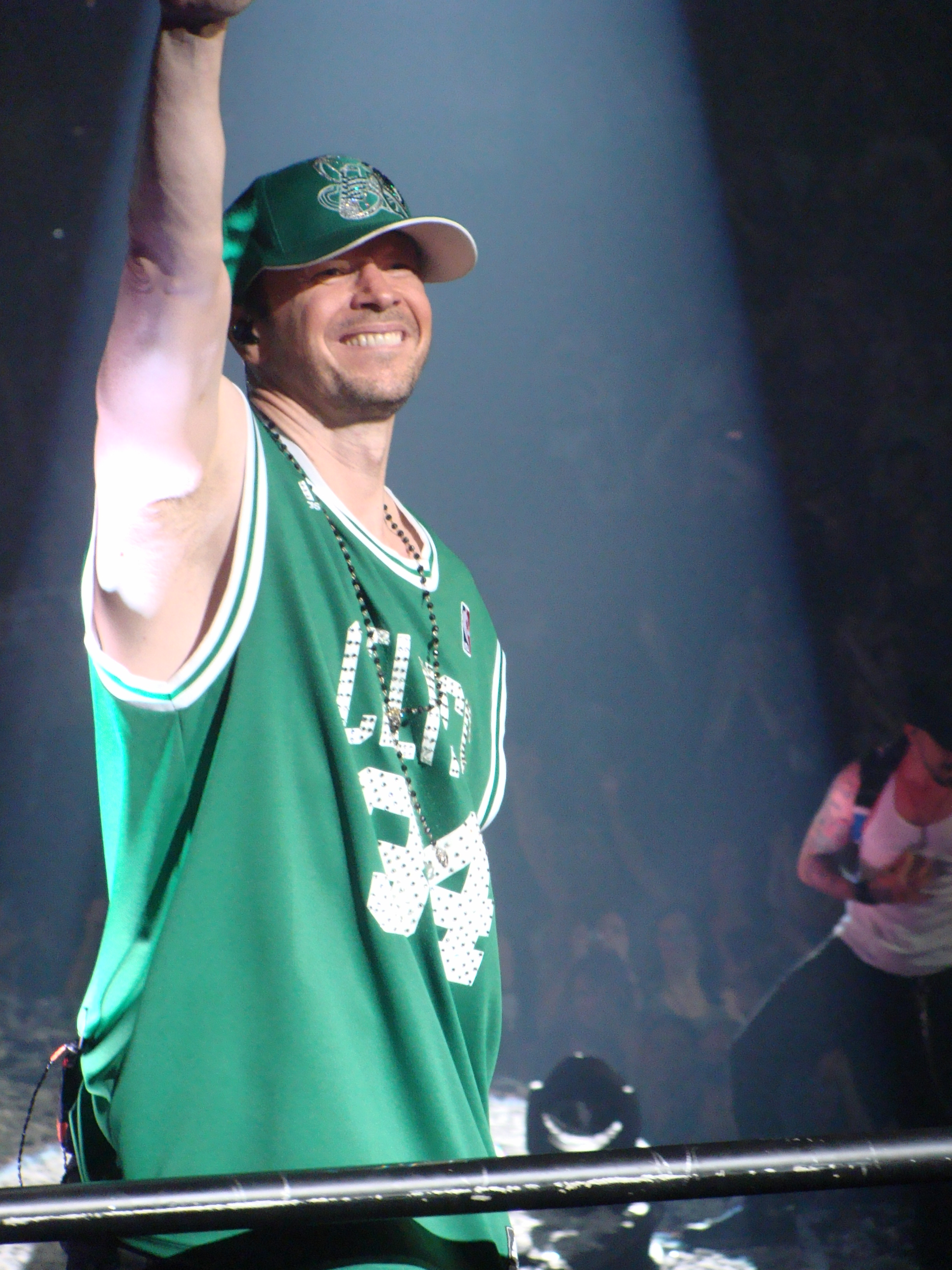
Wahlberg performing in 2011

=== with New Kids on the Block ===
Studio albums

- New Kids on the Block (1986)
- Hangin' Tough (1988)
- Step by Step (1990)
- Face the Music (1994)
- The Block (2008)
- 10 (2013)
- Still Kids (2024)

=== Solo ===
- "The Right Combination" – duet with Seiko Matsuda (1990)

== Filmography ==
=== Film ===
Year	Title	Role	Notes
1996	Bullet	Big Balls	
1996	Ransom	Cubby Barnes	
1997	Black Circle Boys	Greggo	
1998	Butter	Rick Damon	
1998	Body Count	Booker	
1998	Southie	Danny Quinn	
1999	The Sixth Sense	Vincent Grey	
2000	Bullfighter	Chollo	
2000	Diamond Men	Bobby Walker	
2002	Triggermen	Terry Mulloy, Hitman	
2003	Dreamcatcher	Douglas 'Duddits' Cavell	
2005	Magnificent Desolation: Walking on the Moon 3D	Himself	Documentary film
2005	Marilyn Hotchkiss' Ballroom Dancing and Charm School	Randall Ipswitch	
2005	Saw II	Detective Eric Matthews	
2006	Annapolis	Commander Burton	
2006	Saw III	Detective Eric Matthews	
2007	Dead Silence	Detective Jim Lipton	
2007	Saw IV	Detective Eric Matthews	
2008	Righteous Kill	Detective Teddy Riley	
2008	What Doesn't Kill You	Detective Moran	
2011	Zookeeper	Shane	

=== Television ===
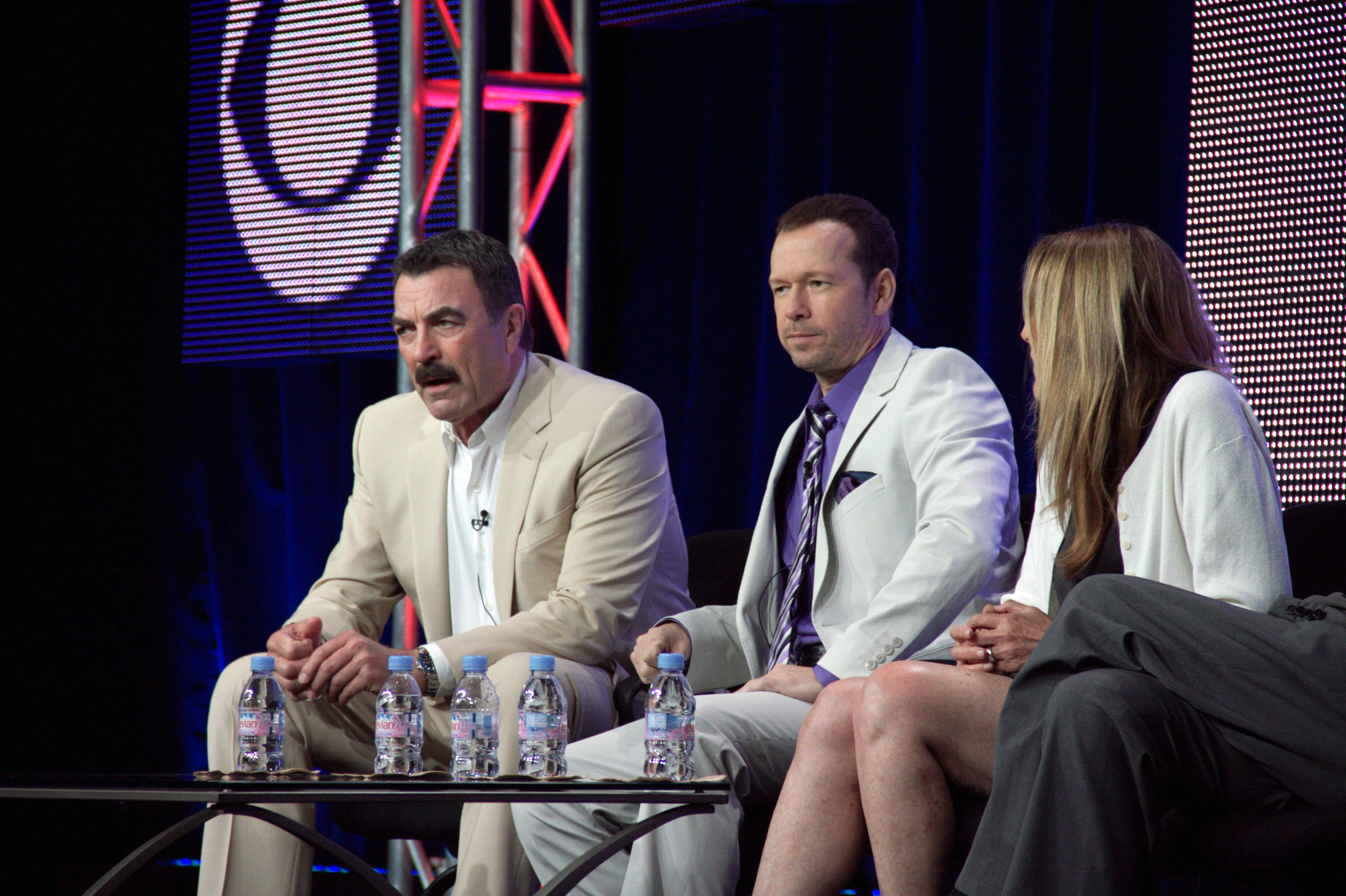
Cast of TV series Blue Bloods at the 2010 Summer Session of the Television Critics Association

Year	Title	Role	Notes
1989	House of Style	Himself	Episode: "Fall '89"
1998	The Taking of Pelham One Two Three	Mr. Grey	Television film
1999	Purgatory	Deputy Glen/Billy 'The Kid'	Television film
2000	Where Are They Now?	Himself	Episode: "Bad Boys of Rock"
2000	The Practice	Patrick Rooney	Episode: "Settling"
2001	Big Apple	Chris Scott	Main cast
2001	Band of Brothers	Carwood Lipton	Main cast
2001	UC: Undercover	Bobby	Episode: "City on Fire"
2002–2003	Boomtown	Detective Joel Stevens	Main cast
2006	The Path to 9/11	Detective Kirk	Episode: "Part I & II"
2006	Runaway	Paul Rader	Main cast
2007	HypaSpace	Himself	Episode: "Episode #6.54"
2007	Kings of South Beach	Detective Andy	Television film
2007	The Kill Point	Detective Horst Cali	Main cast
2008	Intervention	Himself/narrator (voice)	Episode: "Intervention In-Depth: Heroin Hits Home"
2010	In Plain Sight	Jimmy McCabe/Jimmy Porter	Episode: "Father Goes West"
2010	Rizzoli & Isles	Lieutenant Joey Grant	Recurring cast (season 1)
2010–2024	Blue Bloods	Daniel Fitzgerald "Danny" Reagan	Main cast
2013	Boston's Finest	Himself/narrator (voice)	Main narrator: Season 1
2013	Massholes	Himself	Episode: "Boston's Finest"
2014	The View	Himself/guest co-host	Episode: "Guest Co-Hosts Donnie Wahlberg & Rick Fox/Noah Wyle"
2014–2019	Wahlburgers	Himself	Recurring cast
2015–2016	Donnie Loves Jenny	Himself	Main cast
2015–2016	Rock This Boat: New Kids On The Block	Himself	Main cast
2016	Fuller House	Himself	Episode: "New Kids in the House"
2017	30 for 30	Himself/narrator (voice)	Episode: "Celtics/Lakers: Best of Enemies, Part 1-3"
2017	Return of the Mac	Himself	Main cast
2019	Entertainment Tonight	Himself/Guest co-host	Episode: "Blue Bloods Exclusive!"
2019–present	Very Scary People	Himself/host	Main host
2021	The Masked Singer	Himself/Cluedle-Doo	Season 5
2025	Bar Rescue	Himself/Guest recon spy	Episode: "Rock Bottom at Top Shelf"
2025–present	Boston Blue	Daniel Fitzgerald "Danny" Reagan	Also Executive producer/lead role

=== Music videos ===
Year	Title	Role
1991	MC Hammer	"2 Legit 2 Quit"

=== Video games ===
Year	Title	Role	Notes
2008	Turok	Shepherd (voice)	

== Awards and nominations ==
Year	Award	Category	Nominated work	Result	Ref.
2006	Teen Choice Awards	Choice Movie Scream	Saw II	Nominated	
2014	Primetime Emmy Awards	Outstanding Unstructured Reality Program	Wahlburgers	Nominated	
2015	Primetime Emmy Awards	Outstanding Unstructured Reality Program	Wahlburgers	Nominated	
2017	People's Choice Award	Favorite TV Crime Drama Actor	Blue Bloods	Nominated	
