= Life in the Streets =

Studio album by Prince Ital Joe and Marky Mark
- Released: 29 April 1994
- Recorded: 1993–1994
- Genres: Eurodance; hip house; Euro reggae
- Label: Ultraphonic Records
- Producers: Alex Christensen; Frank Peterson; MC Shan; Prince Ital Joe

Marky Mark and Prince Ital Joe chronology
Life in the Streets (1994)	The Remix Album (1995)

Marky Mark chronology
You Gotta Believe (1992)	Life in the Streets (1994)	The Remix Album (1995)

Prince Ital Joe chronology
Life in the Streets (1994)	The Remix Album (1995)

Professional ratings
Review scores
Source	Rating
Music & Media	(favorable)
Music Week	3/5 stars
NME	3/10
Smash Hits	2/5

Life in the Streets is the debut studio album by reggae and ragga recording artist Prince Ital Joe and the third studio album by rapper Marky Mark. The album was released in 1994 for Ultraphonic Records and blended Prince Ital Joe's reggae with Marky Mark's hip-hop. Life in the Streets was not released in the United States, but it was a success in Germany, where most of the album was produced in the Eurodance style. Four singles charted on Germany's Media Control Charts: "Life in the Streets" (number 12), "Happy People" (number four), "Babylon" (number 17), and "United", which held the number one position for five weeks. Songs "Life in the Streets", "In Love" and "United" appeared in the Danny DeVito movie Renaissance Man, while "United" also appeared in The NeverEnding Story III.

== Critical reception ==
Pan-European magazine Music & Media wrote, "United they made more impact then the two on their own. The album roughly follows the pattern of the hit single(s), which is Euro dance coupled with American rap know-how. Currently residing on Jamaica, the Prince throws in some reggae ('To Be Important') for good measure, whereas Boston kid Marky takes care of the streetwise hip hop ('In the 90's'). Despite his job as a model for Calvin Klein, he's still very keen on staying real. It's the kind of reality, based on the certainty of a further string of hits engendered by this work of collaboration". Emma Cochrane from Smash Hits commented, "Apart from the brill, smoothy title track, which features in the film, there are some great dance tracks here too, like 'United' and 'Happy People'".

== Track listing ==
1. "Life in the Streets Intro" – 1:43
2. "United" – 4:02
3. "Rastaman Vibration" – 3:35
4. "Happy People" – 3:58
5. "To Be Important" – 3:54
6. "In Love" – 3:40
7. "Babylon" – 3:54
8. "Love of a Mother" – 3:38
9. "Into the Light" – 3:56
10. "In the 90's" – 3:16
11. "Prankster" – 5:02
12. "Life in the Streets" – 3:44

== Credits ==
- Lyrics: Alex Christensen (tracks: 1, 2, 4, 6, 7, 9, 12), Frank Peterson (tracks: 1, 2, 4, 7, 9, 12), Joe Paquette, Mark Wahlberg
- Music: Alex Christensen (tracks: 1 to 5, 10, 12), Frank Peterson (tracks: 1 to 5, 7, 9, 10, 12)
- Performer [all instruments]: Frank Peterson (tracks: 1–7, 9, 10, 12)
- Guitar: Thomas Schwarz
- Producer: Alex Christensen (tracks: 1–7, 9, 10, 12), Frank Peterson (tracks: 1–7, 9, 10, 12), Fabian Cooke, Joe Paquette, Tyrone Downing (track 8), Fabian Cooke, MC Shan (track 11)
- Solo vocals: Melina Bruhn, Bridget Fogle, Linda Fields
- Backing vocals: Betsy Miller, Jane Commerford, Kelvyn Hallifax, The London Gospel Community Choir, Penny Lane, Reggie Montgomery, Sandra Blake, Sophie St. Claire
- Photography: Paul Cox

== Charts ==
=== Weekly charts ===
Weekly chart performance for Life in the Streets
Chart (1994)	Peak position
Hungarian Albums (MAHASZ)	8
