= Mark Wahlberg filmography =

Performances by American actor

The following is the complete filmography of American actor and producer Mark Wahlberg.

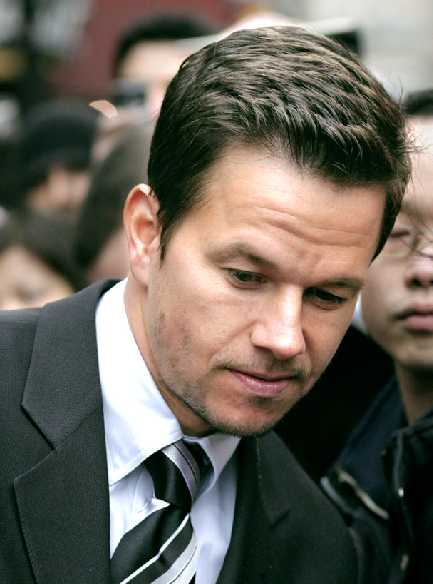
Wahlberg, 2007

== Film ==
Year	Title	Role	Notes	Ref.
1994	Renaissance Man	Private Tommy Lee Haywood		
1995	The Basketball Diaries	Mickey		
1996	Fear	David McCall		
1997	Traveller	Pat O'Hara		
1997	Boogie Nights	Eddie Adams / Dirk Diggler		
1998	The Big Hit	Melvin Smiley		
1999	The Corruptor	Detective Danny Wallace		
1999	Three Kings	Troy Barlow		
2000	The Yards	Leo Handler		
2000	The Perfect Storm	Bobby Shatford		
2001	Planet of the Apes	Captain Leo Davidson		
2001	Rock Star	Chris "Izzy" Cole		
2002	The Truth About Charlie	Joshua Peters		
2003	The Italian Job	Charlie Croker		
2003	Overnight	Himself	Documentary film	
2004	Juvies	Narrator	Documentary film; also executive producer	
2004	I Heart Huckabees	Tommy Corn		
2005	Four Brothers	Bobby Mercer		
2006	Invincible	Vince Papale		
2006	The Departed	Staff Sergeant Sean Dignam		
2007	Shooter	Bob Lee Swagger		
2007	We Own the Night	Captain Joe Grusinsky	Also producer	
2008	The Happening	Elliot Moore		
2008	Max Payne	Max Payne		
2009	The Lovely Bones	Jack Salmon		
2010	Date Night	Holbrooke Grant		
2010	The Other Guys	Detective Terry Hoitz		
2010	The Invocation	Himself	Documentary film	
2010	The Fighter	Micky Ward	Also producer	
2012	Contraband	Chris Farraday	Also producer	
2012	Ted	John Bennett		
2013	Broken City	Billy Taggart	Also producer	
2013	Pain & Gain	Danny Lugo		
2013	2 Guns	Michael 'Stig' Stigman		
2013	Lone Survivor	Marcus Luttrell	Also producer	
2014	Transformers: Age of Extinction	Cade Yeager		
2014	The Gambler	Jim Bennett	Also producer	
2014	Manny	Himself	Documentary film	
2015	Mojave	Norman		
2015	Entourage	Himself	Also producer	
2015	Ted 2	John Bennett		
2015	Daddy's Home	Dusty Mayron		
2016	Deepwater Horizon	Mike Williams	Also producer	
2016	Patriots Day	Tommy Saunders	Also producer	
2017	Transformers: The Last Knight	Cade Yeager		
2017	Daddy's Home 2	Dusty Mayron	Also executive producer	
2017	All the Money in the World	Fletcher Chace		
2018	Mile 22	CIA Officer James Silva	Also co-producer	
2018	Instant Family	Pete Wagner	Also co-producer	
2020	Spenser Confidential	Spenser	Also co-producer	
2020	Scoob!	Brian Crown / Blue Falcon	Voice role	
2020	Joe Bell	Joe Bell	Also producer	
2021	Infinite	Evan McCauley / Heinrich Treadaway 2020	Also producer	
2022	Uncharted	Victor Sullivan		
2022	Father Stu	Father Stuart "Stu" Long	Also producer	
2022	Me Time	Huck Dembo		
2023	The Family Plan	Dan Morgan	Also producer	
2024	Arthur the King	Mikael Lindnord	Also producer	
2024	MoviePass, MovieCrash	None	Documentary film; also producer	
2024	The Union	Mike McKenna	Also producer	
2025	Flight Risk	Daryl Booth		
2025	Play Dirty	Parker		
2025	The Family Plan 2	Dan Morgan	Also producer	
2026	Balls Up	Brad Lewison		
2026	By Any Means	Gregory Scarpa	Also producer	
2027	Weekend Warriors †		Post-production	
2027	The Big Fix †	Chris Eaton	Filming	

== Television ==
Year	Title	Role	Notes
1993	The Substitute	Ryan Westerberg	Television film, credited as Marky Mark
1993	The Ben Stiller Show	Himself	Episode: "A Few Good Scouts"
1993	Out All Night	Himself	Episode: "Under My Thumb"
2004–11	Entourage	Himself	4 episodes
2008	Saturday Night Live	Himself	Episode: "Josh Brolin/Adele" (4.5)
2014–19	Wahlburgers	Himself	36 episodes
2020	Ant & Dec's Saturday Night Takeaway	Himself	1 episode; special guest appearance
2021	Wahl Street	Himself	2 Seasons, 7 episodes
2022	WrestleMania 38	Himself	Opening
2026	Ted: The Animated Series †	John Bennett (voice)	Main role

== Executive producer ==
Year	Title	Notes
2004–11	Entourage	
2008–10	In Treatment	
2010–11	How to Make It in America	
2010–14	Boardwalk Empire	
2013	Prisoners	
2014–19	Wahlburgers	
2015	Stealing Cars	
2015–19	Ballers	
2016–18	Shooter	
2020	McMillions	Television documentary
2023	The Golden Boy	

== See also ==
- List of awards and nominations received by Mark Wahlberg
