= No Mercy (Marky Mark song) =

"No Mercy No Mercy (The Fist of the Tiger)"
- One of cover arts mainly for German releases

Single by Marky Mark
- Released: September 1995
- Studio: Nemo Studios, Hamburg
- Genre: Electronic; hip-hop; pop
- Length: 3:43
- Label: Ultraphonic; EastWest Records GmbH
- Songwriter(s): Alex Christensen; Frank Peterson; Mark Wahlberg

"No Mercy", or in its full title "No Mercy (The Fist of the Tiger)", is a 1995 song by Mark Wahlberg known at the time by the artistic name Marky Mark of the formation Marky Mark and the Funky Bunch. "No Mercy" appeared on the collaborative Prince Ital Joe and Marky Mark album The Remix Album, although this particular track is actually a solo effort by Marky Mark with no participation from Prince Ital Joe.

== Background ==
Wahlberg had struck a friendship with Polish boxer Dariusz Michalczewski. Marky Mark released the track "No Mercy" a biographical song about Michalczewski, including excerpts in Polish from Michalczewski himself. "Tiger" appearing in the title and lyrics is reference to Michalczewski who was known as the "Tiger".

The boxer also appears in the music video that was directed by Frank Papenbroock and Joachim Kirschstein. The music video chronicled the early years of Michalczewski's life played by a young actor. It also includes boxing footage by Dariusz, Marky Mark and other boxing mates.

== Track listing ==
1. "No Mercy (The Fist of The Tiger)" (radio version) (3:43)
2. "No Mercy (The Fist of The Tiger)" (extended version) (4:26)
3. "No Mercy (The Fist of The Tiger)" (club mix) (5:05)
4. "No Mercy (The Fist of The Tiger)" (hip-hop-mix) (3:51)

== Credits ==
- Written by: Alex Christensen, Frank Peterson, Mark Wahlberg
- Producers: Alex Christensen, Frank Peterson
- Guitar: Heiko Radke-Sieb

== Charts ==
The single was released in Europe by Ultraphonic and Warner Music Europe and is copyrighted to EastWest Records GmbH. The single notably reached number 44 on the German Singles Chart.

Weekly charts

Chart (1995)	Peak position
Germany (GfK)	44
Switzerland (Schweizer Hitparade)	37
