= Tiffany Moore =

American murder victim (1976–1988)

- Born: Darlene Tiffany Moore; November 18, 1975; Massachusetts, U.S.
- Died: August 19, 1988 (aged 12); Boston, Massachusetts U.S.
- Cause of death: Gunshot wounds
- Resting place: Resthaven Memorial Gardens, Greenville, South Carolina, U.S. 34.78140°N 82.42920°W (approximate)
- Occupation: Student
- Known for: Victim of unsolved child murder

Darlene Tiffany Moore was a 12-year-old girl from Boston who, at 9:05 p.m. on Friday, August 19, 1988, was unintentionally struck and killed by two stray bullets fired by feuding drug dealers as she was sitting on a neighborhood mailbox.

Moore became an example of Boston's epidemic of gang violence at the time. In Roxbury, one of Boston's more economically depressed neighborhoods, citizens were outraged by the incident.

"The future of Roxbury was represented in her," said then-Roxbury City Council member Bruce C. Bolling. "That's why people were so upset and angry. They thought, 'That could have been my daughter, my son, my husband, my wife, anybody who goes about his daily business.'"

Shawn Drumgold was convicted of Moore's death on October 13, 1989. In November 2003, Drumgold's conviction was overturned. It was revealed that the police had also suppressed witnesses who supported Drumgold's alibi.

Moore's death was recounted in the song "Wildside" by Marky Mark and the Funky Bunch, which reached number 10 on the Billboard Hot 100. The case was also brought up several times in the (2019) City On A Hill season one series.

== See also ==
- List of homicides in Massachusetts
- List of unsolved murders (1980–1999)
