= No Mercy =

No Mercy may refer to:

== Books and comics ==
- No Mercy, a 2010 novel in the Dark-Hunter series by Sherrilyn Kenyon
- No Mercy, a comic book series by Alex de Campi and Carla Speed McNeil

== Film ==
- No Mercy (1986 film), an American film directed by Richard Pearce
- No Mercy (2010 film), a South Korean film directed by Kim Hyeong-jun
- No Mercy (2019 film), a South Korean film directed by Im Gyeong-taek

== Music ==
=== Groups ===
- No Mercy (metal band), a 1980s American thrash metal band
- No Mercy (pop band), a 1990s German dance pop group

=== Albums ===
- No Mercy (Blac Monks album) or the title song, 1998
- No Mercy (Da Youngsta's album) or the title song, 1994
- No Mercy (Daddy Yankee album), 1995
- No Mercy (No Mercy album) or My Promise, by the dance pop band, 1996
- No Mercy (T.I. album) or the title song, 2010
- No Mercy (EP), by B.A.P, or the title song, 2012

=== Songs ===
- "No Mercy" (Marky Mark song), 1995
- "No Mercy" (The Stranglers song), 1984
- "No Mercy" (Ty Herndon song), 2000
- "No Mercy", by Cuban Link from Chain Reaction, 2005
- "No Mercy", by Ghetts from Conflict of Interest, 2021
- "No Mercy", by Immortal Technique from Revolutionary Vol. 1, 2001
- "No Mercy", by Khaleel, 1999
- "No Mercy", by L.A. Guns from L.A. Guns, 1988
- "No Mercy", by the Living Tombstone, BlackGryphon & LittleJayneyCakes, 2017
- "No Mercy", by Nils Lofgren from Nils, 1979
- "No Mercy", by Pvris from All We Know of Heaven, All We Need of Hell, 2017
- "No Mercy", by Racoon, 2011
- "No Mercy", by Young M.A from Herstory in the Making, 2019

== Television ==
- WWE No Mercy, a professional wrestling pay-per-view event, 1999–2008 and 2016–2017
- No.Mercy, a 2014 reality survival show that created the South Korean band Monsta X
- No Mercy (TV series), a 2025 South Korean revenge crime thriller television series
- "No Mercy" (The Gifted), a television episode
- "No Mercy" (Mercy Point), a television episode

== Video games ==
- WWF No Mercy (video game), a 2000 video game named for the PPV event
- No Mercy, a 2025 withdrawn controversial video game
- "No Mercy", a campaign in the 2008 video game Left 4 Dead and its sequel Left 4 Dead 2
- "No Mercy", a mission in the 2011 video game Payday: The Heist

== People ==
=== Nicknames ===
- Isabelle Mercier (born 1975), Canadian poker player
- Nozomi Sasaki (model) (born 1988), Japanese model

== See also ==
- Show No Mercy (disambiguation)
- Show Them No Mercy!, 1935 American crime film
