= The Remix Album (Prince Ital Joe album) =

Remix album by Prince Ital Joe and Marky Mark
- Released: 1995
- Recorded: 1993–1994
- Genre: Hip-hop; reggae
- Label: Ultrasonic Records
- Producer: Prince Ital Joe; Frank Peterson; Alex Christensen

Prince Ital Joe and Marky Mark chronology
Life in the Streets (1994)	The Remix Album (1995)

The Remix Album is the second and final studio album by hip-hop and reggae duo Prince Ital Joe and Marky Mark. The album was released in 1995 for Ultraphonic Records and was a remix album featuring remixes from the duo's previous album, Life in the Streets, as well as a Marky Mark solo track, "No Mercy". This would mark the second and final studio album by Prince Ital Joe and the fourth studio album by Marky Mark.

== Track listing ==
1. "United" (Damage Control mix) – 6:18
2. "Rastaman Vibration" (La Bouche mix) – 5:54
3. "Happy People" (Bass Bumpers remix) – 5:45
4. "Babylon" (Fun Factory remix) – 5:18
5. "Life in the Streets" (G-String mix) – 4:13
6. "Babylon" (Loop! remix) – 6:34
7. "United" (The World's Address mix) – 6:45
8. "Happy People" (Damage Control remix) – 5:55
9. "Rastaman Vibration" (House Groove mix) – 6:00
10. "Life in the Streets" (Abbey Road mix) – 8:38
11. "No Mercy" – 5:00
