= Good Vibrations (Marky Mark and the Funky Bunch song) =

1991 single by Marky Mark and the Funky Bunch

- US retail vinyl single

Single by Marky Mark and the Funky Bunch featuring Loleatta Holloway

from the album Music for the People
- B-side: "So What Chu Sayin"
- Released: July 7, 1991
- Genre: Pop rap; hip house
- Length: 4:25
- Label: Interscope
- Songwriters: Donnie Wahlberg; Mark Wahlberg; Spice
- Producer: Donnie Wahlberg

Marky Mark and the Funky Bunch singles chronology
"Good Vibrations" (1991)	"Wildside" (1991)

Loleatta Holloway singles chronology
"So Sweet" (1987)	"Good Vibrations" (1991)	"Take Me Away" (1992)

Music video
- "Good Vibrations" on YouTube

"Good Vibrations" is a song by American group Marky Mark and the Funky Bunch featuring Loleatta Holloway. It was co-written by Donnie Wahlberg, produced by him and released in July 1991, by Interscope Records, as the lead single from their debut album, Music for the People (1991). The song became a number-one hit in the United States, Denmark, Sweden, and Switzerland. The accompanying music video was directed by Scott Kalvert.

== Background ==
"Good Vibrations" was written by Amir 'MC Spice the Legend' Shakir (credited on the release as "Spice") with Donnie Wahlberg while driving to record at Peter Wolf's studio on the Massachusetts South Shore. Shakir also wrote and produced "Wildside" and three other songs for Mark Wahlberg's debut album, as well as four songs on Wahlberg's second LP. "Good Vibrations" features a sample of American singer Loleatta Holloway singing "Love Sensation", written by Dan Hartman, and Hartman was given co-writer credits on later releases of Wahlberg's song.

== Critical reception ==
Bill Lamb from About.com said Mark Wahlberg had a history of scrapes with the law as a teenager, "but his ready-for-video buffed body and good looks, combined with energetic dance beats and Loleatta Holloway's diva-esque vocals, made for a smash pop hit." AllMusic editor Steve Huey noted that the rapper's "aggressively delivered raps were fairly simplistic, but not comical; one of the main hooks was a simple piano sample that ascended, descended, and reascended." He added that "Good Vibrations" "was easily the most infectious song Marky Mark ever recorded". J.D. Considine from The Baltimore Sun felt that when Mark rides the rhythm, "it's easy to forgive his derivative rhymes, particularly when the beat is as strong as it is on 'Good Vibrations'." Billboard magazine named it one of the "pick tracks" from the Music for the People album, noting that it features "canny sampling", and adding that Marky Mark "enters Vanilla Ice territory with a lightweight pop/rap track."

Dave Sholin from the Gavin Report wrote that "bustin' out of Boston", Donnie Wahlberg's younger brother "is kickin' it and makin' one serious debut! The Wahlberg Brothers wrote and produced this hot track—something they deserve to point to with pride. Credit Loleatta Holloway with takin' it up more than a few notches on a chorus nothing short of incredible." A reviewer from Music Week commented, "Sampling is also an art form dear to Marky Mark & the Funky Bunch. But, to their credit, their debut single acknowledges their debut to Loleatta Holloway's now-familiar "It's such a good vibration". This may not be a big hit, but with 20-year-old Marky's rhythmic rapping, good looks and bad-boy image, it's chartbound." Johnny Dee from Smash Hits said "it sounds uncannily like 'Ride On Time' by Black Box with a couple of raps over the top. But! As Marky puts it, this is "designed to make your behind move" and it does."

== Music video ==
A black and white music video was produced to promote the single. It featured Marky Mark working out and boxing barechested, and kissing Traci Bingham on a bed. Boxer Micky Ward is credited for helping with the boxing technique and training used for this video. Loleatta Holloway also made an appearance performing the chorus. Mark Wahlberg first met Micky Ward when he was 18 and later played him on the big screen in the 2010 film The Fighter. The music video was produced by David Horgan and directed by American film director Scott Kalvert.

== Impact and legacy ==
In 2017, BuzzFeed ranked "Good Vibrations" number 43 in their list of "The 101 Greatest Dance Songs of the '90s". In 2019, Billboard magazine ranked it number 115 in their ranking of "Billboard's Top Songs of the '90s". In 2021, it was ranked number 35 by BuzzFeed in their list of "The 50 Best '90s Songs of Summer".

== Track listings ==
- 7-inch single
1. "Good Vibrations" – 4:29
2. "So What Chu Sayin" – 4:41
- CD maxi
1. "Good Vibrations" (club dub) – 5:22
2. "Good Vibrations" – 4:29
3. "Good Vibrations" (instrumental dub) – 5:02
4. "So What Chu Sayin" – 4:41

== Charts ==
=== Weekly charts ===
Chart (1991–1992)	Peak position
Australia (ARIA)	4
Austria (Ö3 Austria Top 40)	15
Belgium (Ultratop 50 Flanders)	8
Canada Top Singles (RPM)	7
Canada Dance/Urban (RPM)	2
Denmark (IFPI)	1
Europe (Eurochart Hot 100)	4
Europe (European Dance Radio)	4
Europe (European Hit Radio)	28
Finland (Suomen virallinen lista)	8
France (SNEP)	35
Germany (GfK)	3
Ireland (IRMA)	16
Israel (Israeli Singles Chart)	13
Netherlands (Dutch Top 40)	10
Netherlands (Single Top 100)	8
New Zealand (Recorded Music NZ)	8
Norway (VG-lista)	2
Sweden (Sverigetopplistan)	1
Switzerland (Schweizer Hitparade)	1
UK Singles (Official Charts)	14
UK Airplay (Music Week)	31
UK Dance (Music Week)	33
US Billboard Hot 100	1
US 12-inch Singles Sales (Billboard)	1
US Dance Club Play (Billboard)	10
US Hot R&B Singles (Billboard)	64
US Cash Box Top 100	4

=== Year-end charts ===
Chart (1991)	Position
Australia (ARIA)	64
Belgium (Ultratop)	87
Canada Top Singles (RPM)	91
Canada Dance/Urban (RPM)	27
Europe (Eurochart Hot 100)	85
Netherlands (Dutch Top 40)	88
Netherlands (Single Top 100)	63
Sweden (Topplistan)	6
US Billboard Hot 100	20
US 12-inch Singles Sales (Billboard)	25
US Cash Box Top 100	32

Chart (1992)	Position
Germany (Media Control)	78

== Certifications ==
Region	Certification	Certified units/sales
Australia (ARIA)	Gold	35,000^{^}
United States (RIAA)	Gold	500,000^{^}
^{^} Shipments figures based on certification alone.

== Release history ==
Region	Date	Format(s)	Label(s)	Ref.
United States	July 7, 1991	—N/a	Interscope	
Australia	September 23, 1991	12-inch vinyl; CD; cassette	Interscope	
Japan	December 10, 1991	Mini-CD	Interscope; EastWest America	
