= Show No Mercy (disambiguation) =

Show No Mercy is a 1983 album by Slayer, or the title song.

Show No Mercy may also refer to:

- No quarter, the military command to not spare any enemy
- Show No Mercy, a 2008 novel by Cindy Gerard
- Show No Mercy (Bride album), 1986, or the title song
- "Show No Mercy" (song), a 1990 song by Mark Williams
- "Show No Mercy", a song by W.A.S.P. from the album W.A.S.P.

== See also ==
- Show Them No Mercy!, 1935 American crime film
- No Mercy (disambiguation)
