= Flecha Azul =

Brand of tequila produced in Mexico

Tequila Flecha Azul
- Company type: Private
- Industry: Distilled beverages
- Founded: Jalisco, Mexico (2022)
- Key people: Mark Wahlberg, Abraham Ancer, Aron Marquez
- Products: Tequila
- Website: flechaazultequila.com

Flecha Azul is a brand of tequila produced in Jalisco, Mexico by Abraham Ancer and Aron Marquez. Mark Wahlberg invested in the company in 2021.
