= Happy People (Prince Ital Joe and Marky Mark song) =

Single by Prince Ital Joe and Marky Mark

from the album Life in the Streets
- Released: November 1993
- Studio: Nemo Studio, Hamburg
- Genre: Eurodance; ragga
- Length: 3:59
- Label: EastWest; Ultraphonic
- Songwriters: Prince Ital Joe; Mark Wahlberg
- Producers: Alex Christensen; Frank Peterson

Prince Ital Joe and Marky Mark singles chronology
| "Happy People" (1993) | "United" (1994) |

Music video
- "Happy People" on YouTube

"Happy People" is a song by Dominican-American reggae/ragga recording artist Prince Ital Joe featuring American rapper Marky Mark. It is their first single as a duo, released in November 1993 by EastWest and Ultraphonic as the lead single from the duo's first and only album, Life in the Streets (1994). Written by Ital Joe and Mark, and produced by Alex Christensen and Frank Peterson, the song became a hit all over Europe, peaking at number four in Germany. It sold over 400.000 copies there, earning the duo a gold record. Additionally, "Happy People" was a top-10 hit in Finland and a top-30 hit in Austria, Sweden and Switzerland. The accompanying music video was A-listed on German music television channel VIVA in February 1994.

== Critical reception ==
Upon the release of the single, pan-European magazine Music & Media wrote, "The busy signal of a telephone drives you wild before the chorus starts, where "all the lonely people" out of the Beatles' 'Eleanor Rigby' suddenly become "happy"." Music & Media editor Miranda Watson described it as "a strongly raggainfluenced track with a driving dance beat, a solid hook balanced by rapping from Marky Mark." Leesa Daniels from Smash Hits gave it one out of five, adding, "Yet another rap tune with a message." Another Smash Hits editor, Emma Cochrane, complimented it as a "great dance track".

== Track listing ==
- CD maxi, Germany (1993)
1. "Happy People" (Radio Edit) — 3:59
2. "Happy People" (Long Version) — 5:55
3. "Happy People" (Ragga Version) — 5:59

== Charts ==
=== Weekly charts ===
| Chart (1993–1994) | Peak position |
|---|---|
| Austria (Ö3 Austria Top 40) | 23 |
| Europe (Eurochart Hot 100) | 22 |
| Europe (European Dance Radio) | 19 |
| Finland (Suomen virallinen lista) | 8 |
| Germany (GfK) | 4 |
| Sweden (Sverigetopplistan) | 24 |
| Switzerland (Schweizer Hitparade) | 22 |
| UK Club Chart (Music Week) | 69 |

=== Year-end charts ===
| Chart (1994) | Position |
|---|---|
| Europe (Eurochart Hot 100) | 86 |
| Germany (Media Control) | 17 |
