= You Gotta Believe =

Studio album by Marky Mark and the Funky Bunch
- Released: September 15, 1992
- Recorded: February–June 1992
- Genre: Hip hop; dance; pop rap; new jack swing
- Length: 54:10
- Label: Interscope; Atlantic
- Producer: Mark Wahlberg; Donnie Wahlberg

Marky Mark and the Funky Bunch chronology
| Music for the People (1991) | You Gotta Believe (1992) |

Singles from You Gotta Believe
- 1. "You Gotta Believe" Released: September 8, 1992; 2. "Gonna Have a Good Time" Released: November 10, 1992

Professional ratings
Review scores
| Source | Rating |
|---|---|
| AllMusic | 2.5/5 stars |
| Encyclopedia of Popular Music | 3/5 stars |
| Entertainment Weekly | D+ |
| NME | 5/10 |
| Select | 1/5 medals |

You Gotta Believe is the second and final studio album by American hip hop group Marky Mark and the Funky Bunch, released on September 15, 1992. The album peaked at number 67 on the US Billboard 200.

Two singles were released from the album: "You Gotta Believe" and "Gonna Have a Good Time". "You Gotta Believe" peaked at number 49 on the US Billboard Hot 100, number 54 in the UK Singles Chart, number 55 in Australia and number 34 in New Zealand.

Marky Mark would go on to make two albums with reggae artist Prince Ital Joe without the Funky Bunch before later becoming an actor, using his real name Mark Wahlberg.

== Track listing ==
| No. | Title | Writer(s) | Length |
|---|---|---|---|
| 1. | "The Crisis" | Donnie Wahlberg; J. Taylor | 1:02 |
| 2. | "You Gotta Believe" | D. Wahlberg; James Marshall; Tod Maxwell | 4:32 |
| 3. | "Gonna Have a Good Time" | D. Wahlberg; Spice | 5:01 |
| 4. | "Loungin'" (featuring Donnie D) | D. Wahlberg; Marshall; Maxwell | 4:26 |
| 5. | "Don't Ya Sleep" | D. Wahlberg; Mark Wahlberg; Joseph Verde; Terrance Blocker; Corey Doyle | 2:53 |
| 6. | "I Want You" (introducing Trez) | D. Wahlberg; Spice | 6:09 |
| 7. | "The American Dream" (featuring Donnie D) | D. Wahlberg; M. Wahlberg; Spice; Larry Thomas; John "Cigarette" Johnson | 5:22 |
| 8. | "The "M"" | D. Wahlberg; Taylor | 2:03 |
| 9. | "Get Up (The Funky Bunch Theme)" | D. Wahlberg; Taylor | 3:25 |
| 10. | "Super Cool Mack Daddy" | D. Wahlberg; M. Wahlberg; Taylor; Marshall; Maxwell | 4:43 |
| 11. | "I Run Rhymes" (featuring the Funkiest Band Known to Man) | M. Wahlberg; Thomas; Johnson | 5:16 |
| 12. | "Ain't No Stoppin' the Funky Bunch" (featuring the Funky Bunch) | Verde; Blocker; Doyle | 4:03 |
| 13. | "The Last Song on Side B Part II: Go On" (featuring Daddy Screechie) | Maxwell; Danny Wood; Brad Young; Dow Brain | 4:41 |
| 14. | "The Solution" | D. Wahlberg | 1:03 |

== Charts ==
Chart performance for You Gotta Believe
| Chart (1992) | Peak position |
|---|---|
| US Billboard 200 | 67 |
| US Top R&B/Hip-Hop Albums (Billboard) | 66 |
