= Marky Mark and the Funky Bunch =

American hip-hop group

- clockwise from top; Ashey Ace, Hector, Marky Mark, Scottie Gee and DJ-T

Background information
- Origin: Boston, Massachusetts, U.S.
- Genres: Hip-hop; Eurodance; new jack swing; hip house
- Years active: 1991–1993
- Labels: Interscope; Atlantic
- Past members: Marky Mark; Ashey Ace; Scottie Gee; Hector the Booty Inspector; DJ-T

Marky Mark and the Funky Bunch was an American hip-hop group formed in 1991 by Mark Wahlberg (alias Marky Mark), Scottie Gee, Hector the Booty Inspector, DJ-T, and Ashey Ace. The group's best known song is "Good Vibrations", which made it to number one on the Billboard Hot 100 in 1991, while their follow-up song "Wildside" peaked at number 10.

== History ==
Marky Mark and the Funky Bunch released their debut album, Music for the People on July 23, 1991. The album was a huge success for the group, making it to No. 1 on the Top Heatseekers chart and No. 21 on the Billboard 200. The album's success was fueled by two top-10 singles, both of which were certified gold, "Good Vibrations", which went to No. 1 on the Billboard Hot 100, and "Wildside" which went to No. 10 on the Hot 100. The album itself first went gold on November 15, 1991, before being certified platinum on January 14, 1992.

At the height of the group's success, they also had a video game released by Digital Pictures titled Marky Mark and the Funky Bunch: Make My Video, but the game was not a success and has been considered one of the worst video games ever made.

After the success of Music for the People, the group quickly recorded a follow-up titled You Gotta Believe that was released on September 15, 1992. However, the album achieved little success, only making it as high as No. 67 on the Billboard 200, as did the album's lone charting single also titled "You Gotta Believe" which went to 49 on the Hot 100. The group disbanded in 1993 with their last appearance being "I Want You", which was featured on the Super Mario Bros. movie soundtrack.

After the group disbanded, Mark continued his music career by teaming with reggae musician Prince Ital Joe. The duo released two albums in Europe and had a No. 1 hit in Germany with "United". Mark continued to release music until retiring in 1998 and becoming a successful actor in the United States.

== Members ==
- Marky Mark (Mark Wahlberg)
- DJ-T (Terry Yancey)
- Ashey Ace (Anthony "Ace" Thomas)
- Hector the Booty Inspector (Hector Barros)
- Scottie Gee (Scott Ross)

== Discography ==
Marky Mark and the Funky Bunch discography
- Studio albums: 2
- Singles: 5
- Music videos: 4
- Promotional singles: 3

=== Studio albums ===
List of studio albums, with selected chart positions and certifications
| Title | Studio album details | Peak chart positions | | | | | | | Certifications |
| Title | Studio album details | US | US R&B | AUS | AUT | GER | SWE | UK | Certifications |
|---|---|---|---|---|---|---|---|---|---|
| Music for the People | Release date: July 23, 1991; Label: Interscope; Formats: CD, cassette | 21 | — | 67 | 35 | 37 | 35 | 61 | US: Platinum; CAN: Platinum |
| You Gotta Believe | Release date: September 15, 1992; Label: Interscope; Formats: CD, cassette | 67 | 66 | — | — | — | — | — | |
"—" denotes items which were not released in that country or failed to chart.

=== Singles ===
List of singles, showing selected chart positions and certifications
| Title | Year | Peak chart positions | | | | | | | | | | Certifications | Album |
| Title | Year | US | AUS | AUT | CAN | GER | IRE | NOR | NZ | SWE | UK | Certifications | Album |
|---|---|---|---|---|---|---|---|---|---|---|---|---|---|
| "Good Vibrations" (featuring Loleatta Holloway) | 1991 | 1 | 4 | 15 | 7 | 3 | 16 | 2 | 8 | 1 | 14 | US: Gold; AUS: Gold | Music for the People |
| "Wildside" | 1991 | 10 | 28 | 26 | 30 | 33 | 26 | 10 | — | 22 | 42 | US: Gold | Music for the People |
| "I Need Money" | 1992 | 61 | 121 | — | — | — | — | — | — | — | — | | Music for the People |
| "You Gotta Believe" | 1992 | 49 | 55 | — | — | — | — | — | 34 | — | 54 | | You Gotta Believe |
| "Gonna Have a Good Time" | 1992 | — | — | — | — | — | — | — | — | — | — | | You Gotta Believe |
"—" denotes items which were not released in that country or failed to chart.

=== Promotional singles ===
| Title | Year | Album |
|---|---|---|
| "On the House Tip" | 1992 | Music for the People |
| "Peace" | 1992 | Music for the People |
| "Loungin'" | 1993 | You Gotta Believe |

== Awards and nominations ==
=== Grammy Awards ===
| Year | Nominated work | Award | Result |
|---|---|---|---|
| 1993 | "You Gotta Believe" | Best Rap Solo Performance | Nominated |

=== MTV Video Music Awards ===
| Year | Nominated work | Award | Result |
|---|---|---|---|
| 1992 | "Good Vibrations" | Best Dance Video | Nominated |
| 1992 | "Good Vibrations" | Best Rap Video | Nominated |

=== American Music Awards ===
| Year | Nominated work | Award | Result |
|---|---|---|---|
| 1992 | Marky Mark and the Funky Bunch | Favorite Rap/Hip-Hop New Artist | Nominated |

=== Smash Hits Poll ===
| Year | Nominated work | Award | Result |
|---|---|---|---|
| 1992 | Marky Mark and the Funky Bunch | Best Dance Act | Won |
