= Front Sight Firearms Training Institute =

American private company (1996–2022)

Coordinates: 36.03°N 115.883°W

- Type: Private
- Industry: Firearms Training
- Founded: Bakersfield, California, U.S. (1996)
- Founder: Ignatius Piazza
- Defunct: December 5, 2022; 3 years ago
- Headquarters: Las Vegas, Nevada, U.S.
- Website: frontsight.com

Front Sight Firearms Training Institute, also known as Front Sight and as Front Sight Resorts, was an American company founded in 1996 by Ignatius Piazza. Its business structure depended on the sale of memberships. It declared bankruptcy in May 2022 and was acquired in Chapter 11 bankruptcy by PrairieFire Nevada. PrairieFire Nevada is now the sole administrator and owner of the former Front Sight facilities, with its own curricula and membership offers. Piazza is no longer associated in management or direction of the PrairieFire curricula or organization.

Front Sight operated primarily in one location, near Pahrump, Nevada. A second location in Nikiski, Alaska was closed in 2022 shortly before bankruptcy filings.

== History ==
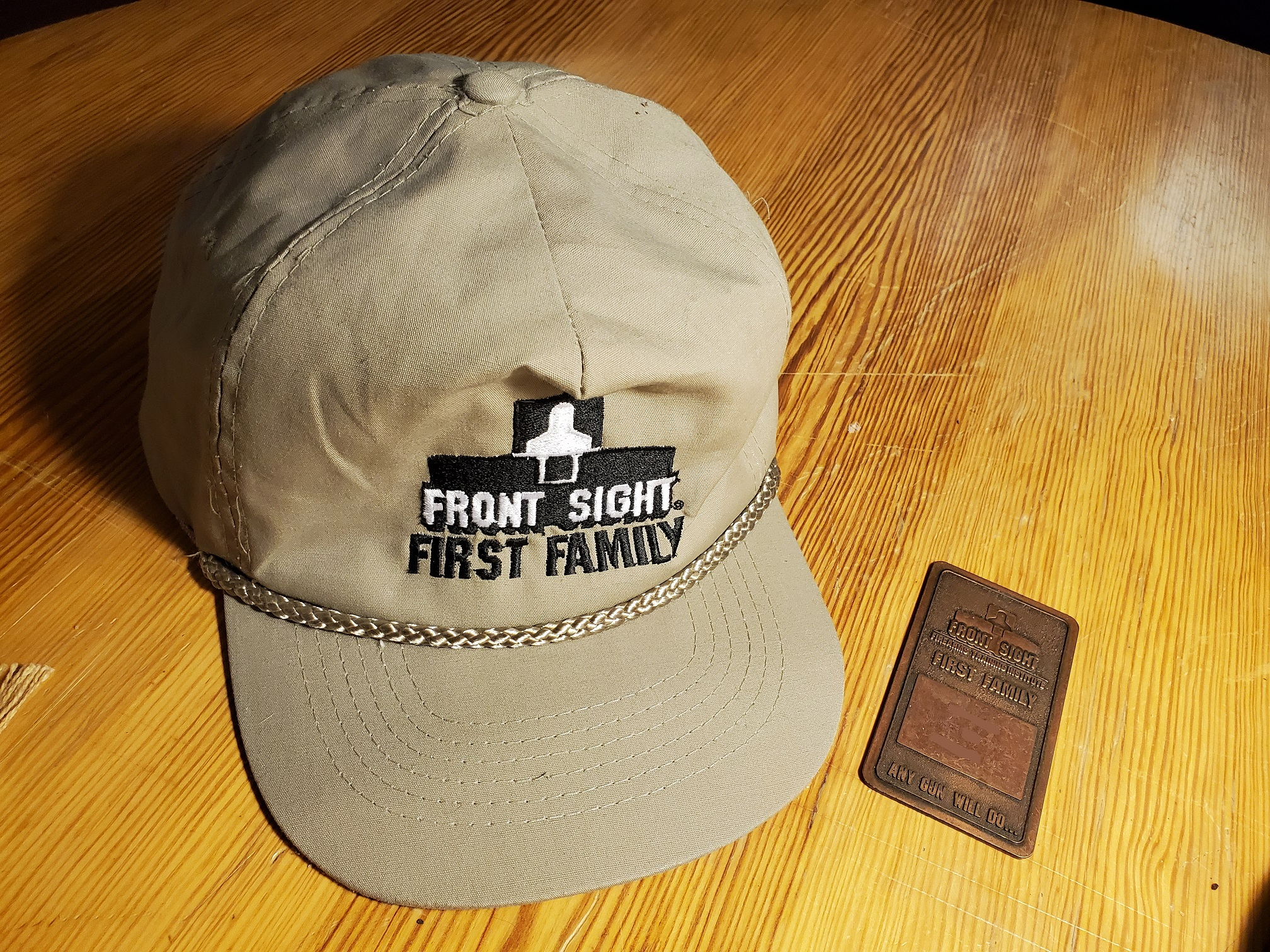
Hat and medallion for a Front Sight "First Family" member, an early membership program at Front Sight.

Piazza, a California native and former chiropractor, graduated from the Four Weapons Combat Master program developed by firearms instructor and writer Chuck Taylor. He spent 25 years developing hundreds of acres of desert into firearms training facilities following his failure to interest any of the then major existing facility owners into partnering towards the expansion of basic firearms training into American society.

The financial program he developed, based on the sales of memberships and upgrades of memberships, brought Front Sight to the forefront of firearms training facilities over the decades but the organization ran into obstacles, challenges and setbacks that eventually resulted in a Chapter 11 transfer of Front Sight's materials, facilities and curricula to PrairieFire Nevada in 2022. The company also printed firearms training manuals.

In 1998, a 550-acre (220 ha) property in Nye County, Nevada, between Las Vegas and Pahrump (near Nevada State Route 160 and Tecopa Road), was purchased and the operation gradually moved there. This location, called "Front Sight Nevada", provides facilities for training in firearms as well as climbing, rappelling, and other forms of self-defense.

In 2006, Mark Wahlberg attended sniper shooting classes at Front Sight to prepare for the 2007 movie Shooter, despite a felony conviction which legally prohibits him from handling firearms. That same year, Piazza and Front Sight were sued in a class action by certain members of the "First Family", an exclusive membership to the Front Sight facility, for failing to deliver on expectations made when the memberships were purchased. A settlement was reached in 2007.

On May 11, 2009, due to Front Sight's legal counsel failing to appear to a hearing, Judge James Ware of the US District Court for Northern California ordered a temporary receiver be appointed to Front Sight. This case is related to the class-action suit, brought by plaintiffs, regarding a multimillion-dollar shortfall in the class-action fund. On May 18, 2009, Front Sight's legal counsel appeared at a settlement hearing and Judge James Ware discharged the interim receiver, leaving Front Sight in control of all aspects of its business. The termination of the receivership was made after the court received a copy of the receiver's report and based upon evidence presented at the May 18 hearing.

In early 2012, Texas news sources revealed preliminary agreements had been signed for a Front Sight Texas campus, to be located in East Montgomery County.

=== Bankruptcy ===
On January 22, 2022, Front Sight notified its members via email of restructuring, which was received critically by most members. The restructuring included substantive changes in value and new charges to members who purchased their memberships under previous terms of purchase. The changes included but were not limited to:

- Closing the Front Sight Alaska facility
- Lifetime memberships now require a new and ongoing $50/month “membership maintenance fee” to remain active. Members who do not pay this fee will forfeit their existing lifetime memberships that were purchased before the membership fee was instituted.
- New facility and staff support fees of $50/day for attendees, including those with pre-existing lifetime memberships for attending courses free of charge.
- Increasing the price of transfer or gifting of a membership from $100 to $1000.
- Limiting training to firearms only, discontinuing courses including unarmed self defense and edged weapons.
- Conversion of all certificates including those for advanced courses to be valid only for introductory courses by first-time attendees.
- New course fees for private training for members, previously included at no additional cost.
- Removing previous membership benefits including “guns at cost,” ammunition and pro shop discounts, free hotel stays, “first-in first-out” privileges.
- Requiring all ammunition to be purchased from Front Sight.
- Requiring all attendees to provide proof of personal liability insurance covering at least $100,000 or purchase coverage at $25/day.

On May 24, 2022, Front Sight Firearms Training Institute filed for bankruptcy.

On Dec 5, 2022, it was announced that Front Sight had been acquired by PrairieFire Nevada, who is immediately taking over all operations. PrairieFire will continue "to deliver to everyone passionate about shooting sports the very best training, experiences, and competitions, typically only available to military and law enforcement heroes", with future plans "to make the beautiful Pahrump Valley a destination for those interested in an adventure-seeking outdoor lifestyle." The founder of Front Sight, Ignatius Piazza, is not involved in any way with PrairieFire, as clarified in a FAQ emailed to members on Dec 7, despite being paid $700,000 yearly for the next 10 years.
