= Wildside (Marky Mark and the Funky Bunch song) =

- US commercial cassette single

Single by Marky Mark and the Funky Bunch

from the album Music for the People
- B-side: "On the House Tip"
- Released: October 23, 1991
- Recorded: 1991
- Genre: Hip hop
- Length: 5:07
- Label: Interscope
- Songwriters: Lou Reed; Mark Wahlberg; Spice
- Producers: Donnie Wahlberg; Spice

Marky Mark and the Funky Bunch singles chronology
"Good Vibrations" (1991)	"Wildside" (1991)	"On the House Tip" (1992)

"Wildside" is a song by American hip-hop group Marky Mark and the Funky Bunch. It was released in October 1991 by Interscope Records, as the second single from their debut album, Music for the People (1991). It heavily samples Lou Reed's 1972 "Walk on the Wild Side". All vocals on the track are performed by the group's leader Mark Wahlberg. "Wildside" peaked at numbers 10 and 12 on the US Billboard Hot 100 and Cash Box Top 100 charts.

== Content ==
Boston pioneer rapper M.C. Spice (Amir Quadeer Shakir) co-wrote and co-produced the song, which describes the effects of America's greed, violence, and drug addiction on innocent, unsuspecting people. It referenced two notorious crimes that happened in Boston; the murder-suicide of Charles Stuart and his wife and the murder of 12-year-old Tiffany Moore shot as she sat on a stoop during a drive by shooting by a youth gang. The early portion of the video features a few seconds of the burning of an American flag.

Originally recorded and performed by M.C. Spice, "Wildside" aired on Boston's W.I.L.D. Radio for nearly two years before Spice agreed to allow Wahlberg to record the song for the actor's debut album. However, Spice removed content which referenced his best friend, Wesley "DJ Wes" McDougald and Wesley's violent death. M.C. Spice still records under the name Quadeer Shakur and M.C. Spice, and is founder of the BlackBerry Soul Radio online music station.

== Chart performance ==
"Wildside" followed the success of the group's previous single, "Good Vibrations", and peaked at number 10 and 12 on the US Billboard Hot 100 and Cash Box Top 100 charts, becoming the group's second and final top-40 single.

== Charts ==
=== Weekly charts ===
Chart (1991–1992)	Peak position
Australia (ARIA)	28
Austria (Ö3 Austria Top 40)	26
Belgium (VRT Top 30 Flanders)	23
Canada (RPM)	30
Finland (Suomen virallinen lista)	19
Germany (GfK)	33
Ireland (IRMA)	26
Norway (VG-lista)	10
Sweden (Sverigetopplistan)	22
UK Singles (OCC)	42
US Billboard Hot 100	10
US Hot Rap Singles (Billboard)	8
US Cash Box Top 100	12

=== Year-end charts ===
Chart (1992)	Position
US Billboard Hot 100	69

== Certifications ==
Region	Certification	Certified units/sales
United States (RIAA)	Gold	500,000^{^}
^{^} Shipments figures based on certification alone.
