= Music for the People (Marky Mark and the Funky Bunch album) =

Studio album by Marky Mark and the Funky Bunch
- Released: July 23, 1991
- Recorded: January–May 1991
- Genre: Hip hop, pop
- Length: 48:22
- Label: Interscope/Atlantic
- Producer: Mark Wahlberg, Donnie Wahlberg, Danny Wood

Marky Mark and the Funky Bunch chronology
Music for the People (1991)	You Gotta Believe (1992)

Singles from Music for the People
- 1. "Good Vibrations" Released: July 16, 1991; 2. "Wildside" Released: October 23, 1991; 3. "I Need Money" Released: January 14, 1992

Professional ratings
Review scores
Source	Rating
AllMusic	3/5 stars
Calgary Herald	B
Robert Christgau	(1-star Honorable Mention)
Encyclopedia of Popular Music	3/5 stars
Entertainment Weekly	C−
Orlando Sentinel	3/5 stars

Music for the People is the debut studio album by American hip hop group Marky Mark and the Funky Bunch, released on July 23, 1991. The album was a success, reaching #1 on the Top Heatseekers Albums chart, and #21 on the Billboard 200, thanks to the hit single, "Good Vibrations". Alongside "Good Vibrations", the album spawned an additional top-ten single, "Wildside" (#10 on the Billboard Hot 100) and the minor hit "I Need Money". The album was certified platinum by the RIAA on January 14, 1992. "Good Vibrations" was Marky Mark and the Funky Bunch's first single, and after its release it went to number one on the U.S. Billboard Hot 100 chart. The song, and most of the album, was produced by Mark Wahlberg's brother, Donnie Wahlberg, who is part of the group New Kids on the Block.

== Background ==
Before the group's formation, Mark Wahlberg, the lead singer of the band, was imprisoned for beating a Vietnamese man in April 1988. Wahlberg had previously dropped out of school at the age of 14 and began hustling, stealing, and selling drugs. After completing his sentence, his older brother Donnie helped him out by getting him involved in the music business. Despite Mark not being the best singer, Donnie helped him and his group debut their first album. In 1990, Donnie Wahlberg convinced younger brother Mark to return to the music scene as Marky Mark and the Funky Bunch, even landing them a spot as opening act for Donnie's band New Kids on the Block. Mark Wahlberg (Marky Mark) was joined by an all-black ensemble including Scott Ross (aka Scottie Gee), Hector Barros (Hector the Booty Inspector), Anthony Thomas (Ashley Ace), and Terry Yancey (DJ-T) to create more of a "street" feel for Mark. The following year Donnie went a step further, producing the group's first and most successful album, Music for the People.

== Reception ==
Music for the People released on July 23, 1991, to mixed reviews. Despite being lauded more for Mark's physique and charisma than musicality, the album still managed to receive a Platinum certification from the Recording Industry Association of America.

James Muretich from Calgary Herald wrote, "...this is all right. The breast-beating bravado is as good as anybody`s, the groove is always good 'n' funky and the tune "Wildside" smartly samples Lou Reed's "Walk on the Wild Side" while using effective street imagery. Yeah, Marky, the Wahlberg with the biceps, actually delivers the goods." MTV's Jason Ankeny said, that "Rap purists were appalled by Wahlberg's mediocre lyrical skills, lame samples, and tired beats." Perry Gettelman from Orlando Sentinel felt the songs on the album "are serviceable enough pop-rap." In an interview with Oral Tradition, DJ Romeo told that he believes Marky Mark’s disjointed rhythm and rap cadence comes primarily from reading the rap from paper while recording, and that while some rappers use “poets tools,” (simile, hyperbole, and alliteration) Marky Mark “just raps.”

They earned a Grammy nomination for Best Rap Solo Performance for their single “You Gotta Believe” in 1992. The group split up in 1993 when Mark Wahlberg decided to take his career in another direction by starting to act.

== Track listing ==
No.	Title	Writer(s)	Producer(s)	Length
1.	"Music for the People"	Donnie Wahlberg; Mark Wahlberg	D. Wahlberg; M. Wahlberg^{[a]}; Leo Okeke^{[a]}	4:19
2.	"Good Vibrations" (featuring Loleatta Holloway)	M. Wahlberg; D. Wahlberg; Amir "M.C. Spice" Shakir	D. Wahlberg; M. Wahlberg^{[a]}; L. Okeke^{[a]}	4:25
3.	"Wildside"	M. Wahlberg; Lou Reed; A. Shakir	D. Wahlberg; Amir "M.C. Spice" Shakir; M. Wahlberg^{[a]}; L. Okeke^{[a]}	5:07
4.	"Bout Time I Funk You"	M. Wahlberg; D. Wahlberg; L. Johnson; Michael Jonzun	D. Wahlberg; M. Wahlberg^{[a]}; L. Okeke^{[a]}	4:29
5.	"Peace"	M. Wahlberg; D. Wahlberg; A. Shakir	D. Wahlberg; M. Wahlberg^{[a]}; L. Okeke^{[a]}	5:28
6.	"So What Chu Sayin"	Danny Wood; D. Wahlberg; M. Wahlberg	D. Wahlberg; M. Wahlberg^{[a]}; L. Okeke^{[a]}	4:41
7.	"Marky Mark is Here"	D. Wahlberg; M. Wahlberg	D. Wahlberg; M. Wahlberg^{[a]}; L. Okeke^{[a]}	4:00
8.	"On the House Tip"	D. Wahlberg; A. Shakir	D. Wahlberg; A. Shakir; M. Wahlberg^{[a]}; L. Okeke^{[a]}	3:42
9.	"Make Me Say Ooh!"	D. Wahlberg; A. Shakir	D. Wahlberg; A. Shakir; M. Wahlberg^{[a]}; L. Okeke^{[a]}	3:43
10.	"I Need Money"	D. Wahlberg; M. Wahlberg	D. Wahlberg; M. Wahlberg^{[a]}; L. Okeke^{[a]}	4:29
11.	"The Last Song on Side B"	M. Wahlberg; D. Wood; Jimmy Castor; J. Pruitt; J. Thomas	D. Wahlberg; D. Wood; M. Wahlberg^{[a]}; L. Okeke^{[a]}	3:59

- ^{^[a]} signifies a co-producer

== Personnel ==
Adapted credits from the media notes of Music for the People.

- Leo Okeke: chief engineer, keyboards, bass, Macintosh Protracks programming, digital sampling
- Donnie Wahlberg: drum programming, Macintosh Protracks programming, digital sampling
- Mary Alford: mixing
- Ted Jensen: mastering (Sterling Sound)
- D.J. Terry Yancey: scratches
- Jeff Dovner, Randy Melton: engineering
- Tom Soares: mix engineering
- Joe Pires, Jamie Locke: assistant mix engineering
- Chuck Reed: A&R coordinator

== Charts ==
Chart performance for Music for the People
Chart (1991)	Peak position
Australian Albums (ARIA)	67
Austrian Albums (Ö3 Austria)	35
Dutch Albums (Album Top 100)	90
German Albums (Offizielle Top 100)	37
Swedish Albums (Sverigetopplistan)	35
UK Albums (OCC)	61
US Billboard 200	21

== Certifications ==
Certifications for Music for the People
Region	Certification	Certified units/sales
Canada (Music Canada)	Platinum	100,000^{^}
United States (RIAA)	Platinum	1,000,000^{^}
^{^} Shipments figures based on certification alone.
