= United (Prince Ital Joe and Marky Mark song) =

- One of cover arts mainly for German releases

Single by Prince Ital Joe and Marky Mark

from the album Life in the Streets
- Released: March 1994
- Recorded: 1993
- Studio: Nemo Studios, Hamburg
- Genre: Eurodance; ragga
- Length: 4:05
- Label: Ultraphonic / EastWest Records GmbH
- Songwriters: Alex Christensen; Frank Peterson; Joseph Paquette; Mark Wahlberg
- Producers: Alex Christensen; Frank Peterson

Prince Ital Joe and Marky Mark singles chronology
"Happy People" (1993)	"United" (1994)	"Babylon" (1995)

"United" is a song recorded by Dominican-American reggae/ragga recording artist Prince Ital Joe and American rapper Marky Mark. It was released in March 1994 as the third single from their debut album, Life in the Streets (1994). The song was co-written and produced by Alex Christensen and Frank Peterson. It reached number one in Germany and Israel, and became a top-10 hit in Austria, Denmark, Finland, Lithuania, the Netherlands, Sweden, and Switzerland.

== Background and release ==
Prince Ital Joe and Marky Mark met by chance in 1993 at the JFK airport in New York and got on so well they decided to record something together. The result was their debut single, "Happy People", a number four hit in Germany. The follow-up, "Life in the Streets", reached number 11. "United", their third single, became their first and only number-one hit on the German Singles Chart, staying on the top position for five weeks. It spent a total of 23 weeks within the chart.

== Critical reception ==
Alan Jones from Music Week gave the song a score of four out of five, writing, "Number one in Germany, this catchy confection combines Ital Joe's Haddaway and Dr. Alban influences with Marky Mark's streetwise rapping. A substantial hit." He later added, "This is an anthemic German production pairing the patois of Prince Ital and a more conventional Marky Mark rap with a big chorus. Don't underestimate the potential of a record which has now been huge all over Europe, and consequently exposed to million of British holidaymakers." Miranda Watson from Music & Media noted that the follow-up single to "Happy People" "again blends the Eurodance sound with ragga and rap." Dele Fadele from NME noted "a hi-NRG stomp, a ridiculously overblown chorus, Marky Mark's hardman rap and Prince Ital Joe's namechecking toast". James Hamilton from the Record Mirror Dance Update deemed it a "Boney M-ish chant-along cheesy German smash" in his weekly dance column. Emma Cochrane from Smash Hits complimented "United" as a "great dance track".

== Music video ==
The accompanying music video for the song features Prince Ital Joe and Marky Mark being chauffeured around predominantly rough neighborhoods of New York City in a Mercedes-Benz 600 Pullmann limousine. This footage is interspersed with a second storyline showing a mixed-race couple reuniting after the female partner has apparently moved out of their apartment. The video was A-listed on German music television channel VIVA and put on "Breakout Rotation" on MTV Europe in May 1994.

== Track listings ==
- CD maxi - Europe (1994)
1. "United" (Radio Edit) - 4:05
2. "United" (Extended Version) - 6:03
3. "United" (United Mix) - 5:33
4. "In the 90's" - 3:21

== Charts ==
=== Weekly charts ===
Chart (1994–95)	Peak position
Austria (Ö3 Austria Top 40)	6
Belgium (Ultratop 50 Flanders)	30
Denmark (IFPI)	7
Europe (Eurochart Hot 100)	9
Europe (European Dance Radio)	13
Europe (European Hit Radio)	33
Finland (Suomen virallinen lista)	10
Germany (GfK)	1
Israel (Israeli Singles Chart)	1
Lithuania (M-1)	2
Netherlands (Dutch Top 40)	9
Netherlands (Single Top 100)	7
Scottish Singles Sales (Official Charts)	72
Sweden (Sverigetopplistan)	6
Switzerland (Schweizer Hitparade)	9
UK Singles (Official Charts)	79
UK Club Chart (Music Week)	87
UK Pop Tip Club Chart (Music Week)	4

=== Year-end charts ===
Chart (1994)	Position
Europe (Eurochart Hot 100)	53
Germany (Media Control)	12
Israel (Israeli Singles Chart)	24
Netherlands (Dutch Top 40)	64
Netherlands (Single Top 100)	76
Sweden (Topplistan)	37
Switzerland (Schweizer Hitparade)	38
