= List of awards and nominations received by Mark Wahlberg =

List of Mark Wahlberg awards and nominations
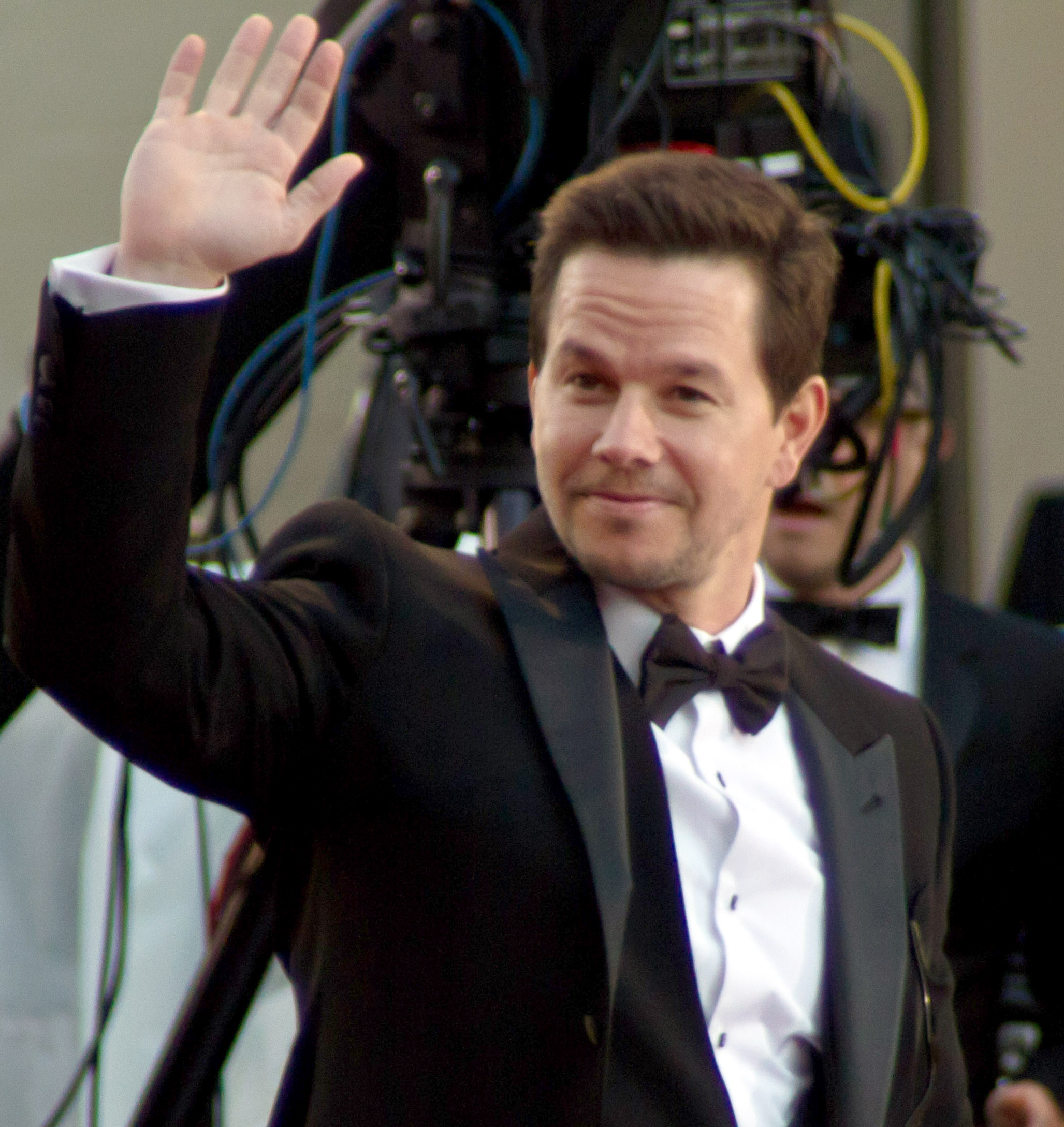
Award	Wins	Nominations
Academy Awards	0	2
BAFTA Awards	1	1
Golden Globes	0	3
News and Documentary Emmy Awards	0	1
Primetime Emmy Awards	0	8
SAG-AFTRA's Actor Awards	0	2
Sports Emmy Awards	1	1

This is a list of awards and nominations received by American actor Mark Wahlberg.

== Major associations ==
=== Academy Awards ===
Year	Category	Nominated work	Result	Ref.
2007	Best Supporting Actor	The Departed	Nominated	
2011	Best Picture	The Fighter	Nominated	

=== BAFTA Awards ===
Year	Category	Nominated work	Result	Ref.
British Academy Television Awards
2007	Best International Programme	Entourage	Won	

=== Emmy Awards ===
Year	Category	Nominated work	Result	Ref.
Primetime Emmy Awards
2007	Outstanding Comedy Series	Entourage	Nominated	
2008	Outstanding Comedy Series	Entourage	Nominated	
2009	Outstanding Comedy Series	Entourage	Nominated	
2011	Outstanding Drama Series	Boardwalk Empire	Nominated	
2012	Outstanding Drama Series	Boardwalk Empire	Nominated	
2014	Outstanding Unstructured Reality Program	Wahlburgers	Nominated	
2015	Outstanding Unstructured Reality Program	Wahlburgers	Nominated	
2020	Outstanding Documentary or Nonfiction Series	McMillions	Nominated	
News and Documentary Emmy Awards
2022	Outstanding Crime and Justice Documentary	The Murders at Starved Rock	Nominated	
Sports Emmy Awards
2026	Outstanding Sports Documentary Series	Cocaine Quarterback: Signal-Caller for the Cartel	Won	

=== Golden Globes ===
Year	Category	Nominated work	Result	Ref.
2007	Best Supporting Actor – Motion Picture	The Departed	Nominated	
2011	Best Actor in a Motion Picture – Drama	The Fighter	Nominated	

=== SAG-AFTRA's Actor Awards ===
Year	Category	Nominated work	Result	Ref.
1998	Outstanding Cast in a Motion Picture	Boogie Nights	Nominated	
2007	Outstanding Cast in a Motion Picture	The Departed	Nominated	
2011	Outstanding Cast in a Motion Picture	The Fighter	Nominated	

== Popular awards ==
=== Critics' Choice Movie Awards ===
Year	Nominated work	Category	Result
2007	The Departed	Best Acting Ensemble	Nominated
2013	Ted	Best Actor in a Comedy	Nominated

=== MTV Movie & TV Awards ===
Year	Nominated work	Category	Result
1997	Fear	Best Villain	Nominated
1998	Boogie Nights	Best Dance Sequence	Nominated
2007	Invincible	Best Kiss (shared with Elizabeth Banks)	Nominated
2013	Ted	Best On-Screen Duo (shared with Seth MacFarlane)	Won
2013	Ted	Best Kiss (shared with Mila Kunis)	Nominated
2013	Ted	Best Fight (shared with Seth MacFarlane)	Nominated

=== People's Choice Awards ===
Year	Nominated work	Category	Result
2015	Transformers: Age of Extinction	Favorite Movie Actor	Nominated
2015	Transformers: Age of Extinction	Favorite Action Movie Actor	Nominated
2016	Ted 2	Favorite Comedic Movie Actor	Nominated
2017	Deepwater Horizon	Favorite Dramatic Movie Actor	Nominated

=== Teen Choice Awards ===
Year	Nominated work	Category	Result
2008	We Own the Night	Choice Movie Actor: Drama	Nominated
2011	The Other Guys	Choice Movie: Chemistry (shared with Will Ferrell)	Nominated
2011	The Other Guys	Choice Movie: Hissy Fit	Nominated
2012	Ted	Choice Movie: Fight (shared with Ted)	Nominated
2014	Lone Survivor	Choice Movie Actor: Action	Nominated
2014	Transformers: Age of Extinction	Choice Summer Movie Star	Nominated
2017	Transformers: The Last Knight	Choice Summer Movie Star: Male	Nominated
2018	Daddy's Home 2	Choice Movie Actor: Comedy	Nominated
2019	Instant Family	Choice Comedy Movie Actor	Nominated

== Other awards and nominations ==
=== African-American Film Critics Association ===
Year	Nominated work	Category	Result
2010	The Fighter	Best Actor	Won

=== Blockbuster Entertainment Awards ===
Year	Nominated work	Category	Result
1999	Three Kings	Favorite Action Team (shared with George Clooney and Ice Cube)	Nominated

=== Boston Society of Film Critics ===
Year	Nominated work	Category	Result
2006	The Departed	Best Supporting Actor	Won
2010	The Fighter	Best Cast	Won

=== Florida Film Critics Circle ===
Year	Nominated work	Category	Result
1997	Boogie Nights	Best Cast	Won

=== Golden Raspberry Awards ===
Year	Nominated work	Category	Result
2009	The Happening, Max Payne	Worst Actor	Nominated
2018	Daddy's Home 2, Transformers: The Last Knight	Worst Actor	Nominated
2022	Infinite	Worst Actor	Nominated
2022	Infinite	Worst Picture	Nominated

=== National Board of Review ===
Year	Nominated work	Category	Result
2007	The Departed	Best Cast	Won

=== National Society of Film Critics ===
Year	Nominated work	Category	Result
2007	The Departed	Best Supporting Actor	Nominated

=== Online Film Critics Society ===
Year	Nominated work	Category	Result
2007	The Departed	Best Supporting Actor	Nominated

=== San Diego Film Critics Society ===
Year	Nominated work	Category	Result
2010	The Fighter	Best Performance by an Ensemble	Nominated

=== Satellite Awards ===
Year	Nominated work	Category	Result
1998	Boogie Nights	Best Actor – Motion Picture Drama	Nominated
2005	I Heart Huckabees	Best Supporting Actor – Motion Picture, Musical or Comedy	Nominated
2006	The Departed	Best Ensemble Cast – Motion Picture	Won
2021	Himself	Humanitarian Award	Won
2023	Father Stu	Best Actor in a Motion Picture, Drama	Nominated

=== Toronto Film Critics Association ===
Year	Nominated work	Category	Result
2006	The Departed	Best Supporting Actor	Nominated

=== Washington D.C. Area Film Critics Association ===
Year	Nominated work	Category	Result
2010	The Fighter	Best Ensemble	Nominated
