= Mark Wahlberg =

American actor (born 1971)

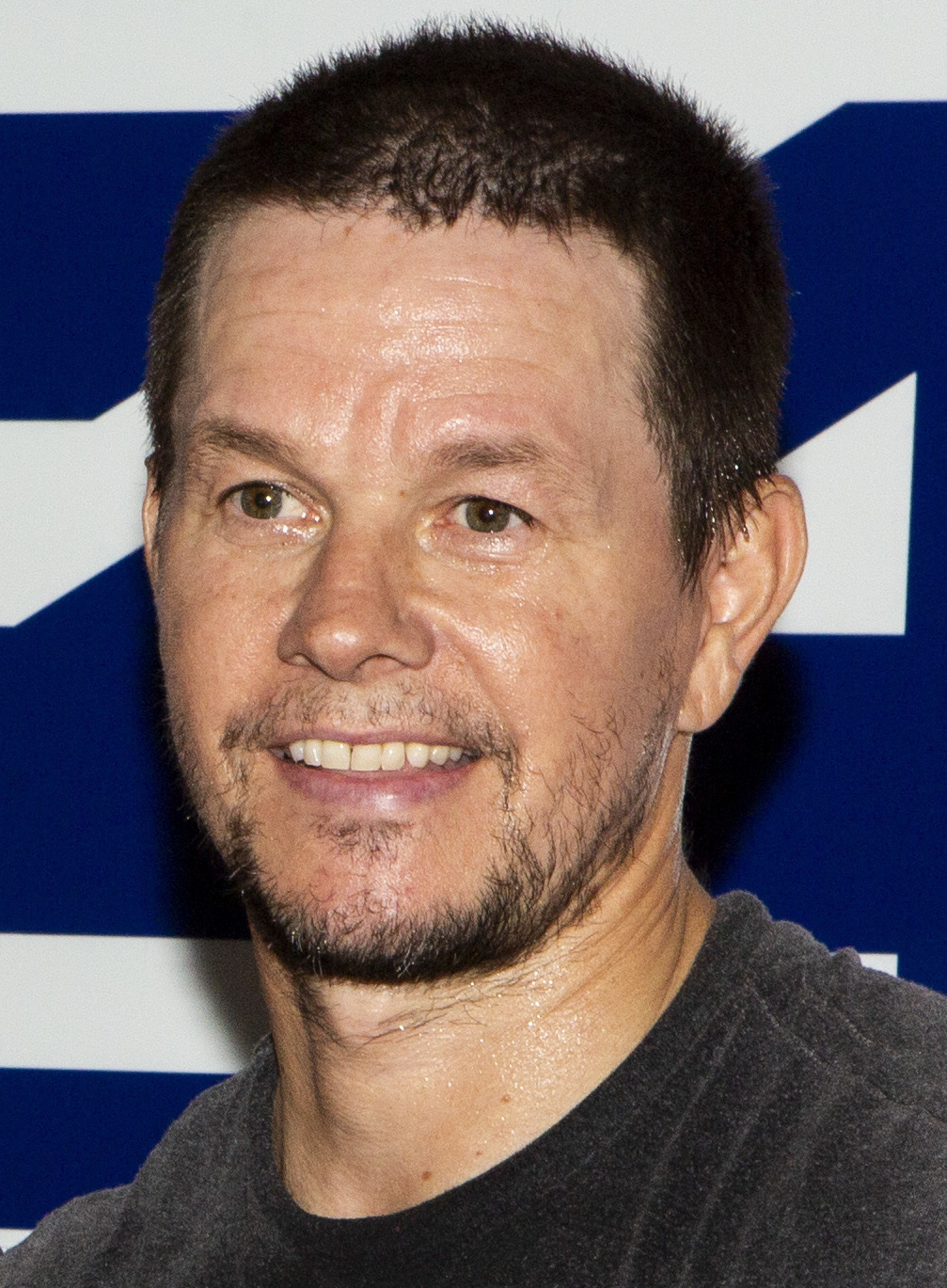
- Wahlberg in 2021
- Born: Mark Robert Michael Wahlberg; June 5, 1971 (age 55); Boston, Massachusetts, U.S.
- Occupations: Actor; producer; businessman; rapper
- Years active: 1989–present
- Works: Filmography
- Spouse: Rhea Durham (m. 2009)
- Children: 4
- Relatives: Donnie Wahlberg (brother); Jenny McCarthy (sister-in-law); Jim Wahlberg (brother); Robert Wahlberg (brother); Paul Wahlberg (brother); Jeff Wahlberg (nephew)
- Awards: Full list
- Musical career
- Also known as: Marky Mark
- Genres: Hip hop; Eurodance; R&B; pop; new jack swing
- Instrument: Vocals
- Years active: 1984–1997
- Labels: Interscope; Atlantic
- Formerly of: Marky Mark and the Funky Bunch; New Kids on the Block

Mark Robert Michael Wahlberg (born June 5, 1971), formerly known by his stage name Marky Mark, is an American actor, producer, and former rapper. His work as a leading man spans the comedy, drama, and action genres. He has received multiple accolades, including a BAFTA TV Award and a Sports Emmy Award, and nominations for two Academy Awards, three Golden Globes, and nine Primetime Emmy Awards.

Wahlberg was born in Boston. As a youth, he took part in a number of violent and racially motivated attacks, resulting in a felony conviction. He gained fame as a member of the hip hop group Marky Mark and the Funky Bunch in the 1990s, with whom he released the albums Music for the People (1991) and You Gotta Believe (1992). Wahlberg made his screen debut in Renaissance Man (1994) and had his first starring role in Fear (1996). He received critical praise for his performance as porn actor Dirk Diggler in Boogie Nights (1997).

In the early 2000s, Wahlberg ventured into big-budget action movies, such as The Perfect Storm (2000), Planet of the Apes (2001), and The Italian Job (2003). He was nominated for the Academy Award for Best Supporting Actor for playing a police officer in the crime drama The Departed (2006). He was nominated for the Golden Globe Award for Best Actor for portraying Micky Ward in the sports drama biopic The Fighter (2010); as co-producer, he was nominated for the Academy Award for Best Picture. During the 2010s, Wahlberg landed successful comedy roles with The Other Guys (2010), Ted (2012), Ted 2 (2015), Daddy's Home (2015), and Daddy's Home 2 (2017). He also starred in the Transformers films Age of Extinction (2014) and The Last Knight (2017). He was the world's highest-paid actor in 2017.

Wahlberg served as executive producer of five HBO series: the comedy-drama Entourage (2004–2011), the period crime drama Boardwalk Empire (2010–2014), the comedy-dramas How to Make It in America (2010–2011) and Ballers (2015–2019), and the documentary McMillions (2020). He is co-owner of the Wahlburgers chain and co-starred in the reality TV series about it. Wahlberg received a star on the Hollywood Walk of Fame in 2010.

== Early life and family ==
Mark Robert Michael Wahlberg was born on June 5, 1971, in the Dorchester neighborhood of Boston, Massachusetts. He is the youngest of nine children, including actor Robert and singer/actor Donnie. His mother, Alma Elaine (née Donnelly), was a bank clerk and a nurse's aide, and his father, Donald Edmond Wahlberg Sr., was a U.S. Army veteran of the Korean War. After his parents divorced in 1982, he divided his time between them.

Wahlberg's father was of Swedish and Irish descent. His mother was of Irish, English and French-Canadian ancestry. On his mother's side of the family, he is distantly related to novelist and short story writer Nathaniel Hawthorne. Wahlberg was raised Catholic.

== Career ==
=== Music career ===
Wahlberg first came to fame as the younger brother of Donnie Wahlberg of the successful boy band New Kids on the Block. Mark, at age 13, was one of the group's original members, along with Donnie, but quit after a few months. Danny Wood, Jordan Knight, Jonathan Knight and Joey McIntyre all joined the group after Mark had left.

In 1990, Wahlberg began recording with dancers/rappers Scott Ross (Scottie Gee), Hector Barros (Hector the Booty Inspector), Anthony Thomas (Ashley Ace), and Terry Yancey (DJ-T) as Marky Mark and the Funky Bunch, earning a hit with "Good Vibrations" from their debut album Music for the People. The record, produced by brother Donnie, hit number one on the Billboard Hot 100, later becoming certified as a platinum single. The second single, "Wildside", peaked at number five on Billboard's Hot Singles Sales chart and number 10 on the Billboard Hot 100. It was certified as a gold single. Marky Mark opened for the New Kids on the Block during their last tour. Marky Mark and the Funky Bunch also had their own video game, titled Marky Mark and the Funky Bunch: Make My Video, which, despite the band's success, was a huge flop. The second Marky Mark and the Funky Bunch LP, You Gotta Believe, was not as successful as the first, yielding only a minor hit single in the title track.

In December 1992, while performing on the British TV show The Word, Wahlberg praised Shabba Ranks, who had stated gay people should be crucified. GLAAD condemned him and berated Calvin Klein for using him to promote their products. A self-titled autobiographical picture book, Marky Mark, with images taken by Lynn Goldsmith and statements mostly by him, was also released. Trying to resuscitate his music career, he had shifted to Hamburg, where he was produced under the label of East West Records by Frank Peterson and Alex Christensen.

Wahlberg later collaborated with the late reggae/ragga singer Prince Ital Joe on the album Life in the Streets. The project combined rap vocals, electronic-infused ragga, and "European dancefloor" music, delivering the singles "Happy People", German number one hit "United", "Life in the Streets", and "Babylon", with Peterson and Christensen as producers. Many of these tracks featured on the film Renaissance Man, starring Wahlberg and Danny Devito.

In 1995, he released a single titled "No Mercy", in support of his friend Dariusz Michalczewski, whom he had befriended earlier in the 1990s. Michalczewski also appears in the music video of the song. Wahlberg and Prince Ital Joe released another album in 1995 for Ultraphonic Records. Titled The Remix Album, it featured remixes from the duo's previous album, Life in the Streets, as well as Mark's solo track, "No Mercy".

After his album with Ital Joe became a hit in Germany, he started putting together a musical act called One Love with him as its producer and also sometimes its lead singer. He also started production on a third studio album. He featured in their song titled "That's the Way I Like It". In 1996, Wahlberg returned to Hamburg to record a solo single titled "Hey DJ" with producer Toni Cottura. Two more solo tracks titled "Feel the Vibe" and "Best of My Love" were released in 1997.

In 2000, he was featured in the Black Label Society music video for "Counterfeit God", as a stand-in for the band's bassist.

=== Film and TV career ===
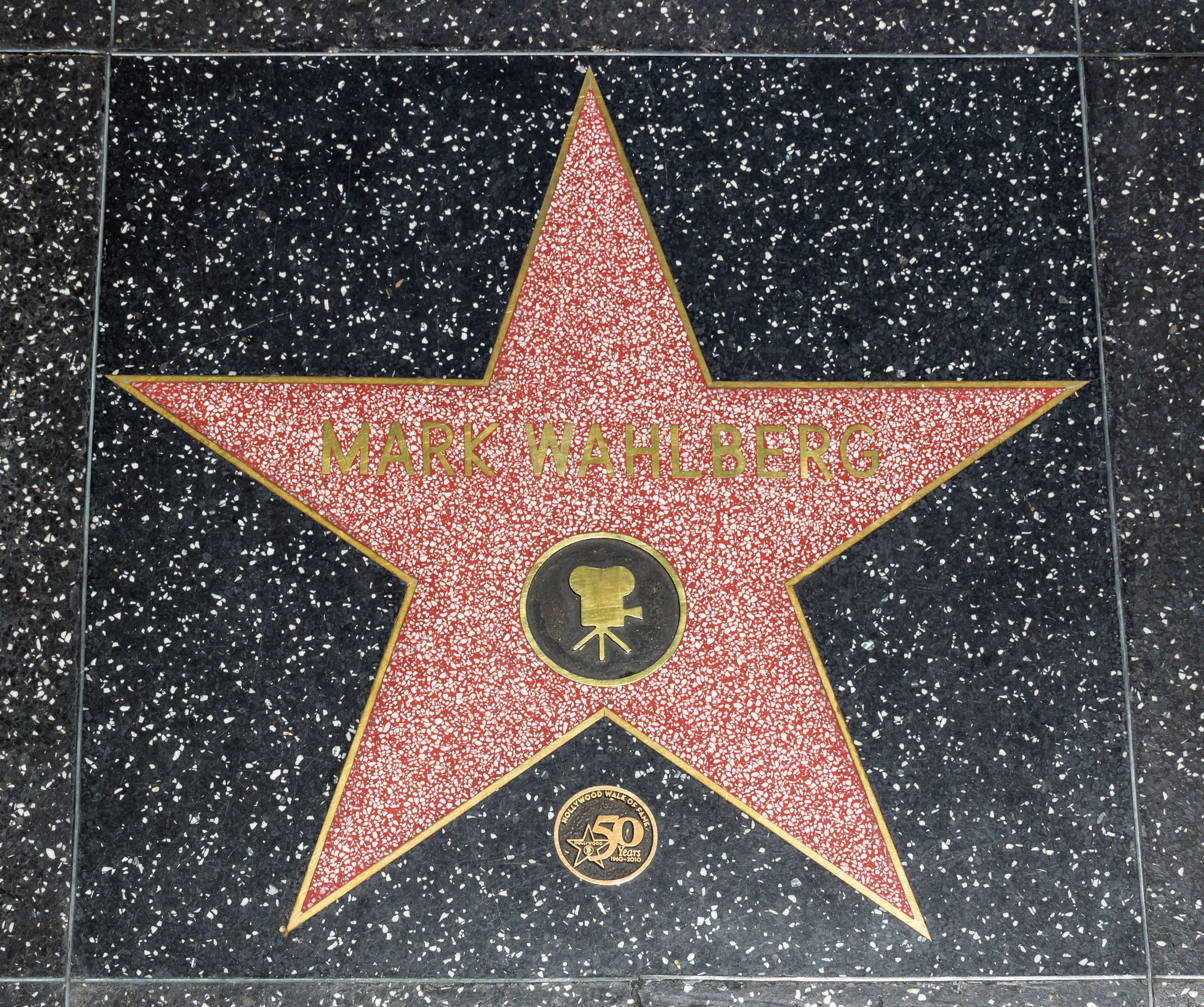
Wahlberg's Star at the Hollywood Walk of Fame

In 1993, Wahlberg made his acting debut in the television film The Substitute. After this appearance, he dropped the "Marky Mark" name. His big screen debut came the next year, with the Danny DeVito feature Renaissance Man. A basketball fanatic, he caught the attention of critics after appearing alongside Leonardo DiCaprio in The Basketball Diaries (1995), a film adaptation of the Jim Carroll book of same name, playing the role of Mickey. He had his first starring role in James Foley's thriller film Fear (1996).

He earned positive reviews after films Boogie Nights (1997), The Big Hit (1998), Three Kings (1999), The Perfect Storm (2000), and Four Brothers (2005). During the early 2000s, Wahlberg appeared in remakes of 1960s films such as Planet of the Apes (2001), The Truth About Charlie (2002) (a remake of the 1963 film Charade), and The Italian Job (2003). His performance in I Heart Huckabees was voted the best supporting performance of the year in the 2004 The Village Voice Critics Poll. Wahlberg was originally cast as Linus Caldwell in Ocean's Eleven, but Matt Damon played the role instead. The two later worked together in The Departed. Wahlberg was also considered for a role in the film Brokeback Mountain. It was originally intended to star Wahlberg and Joaquin Phoenix (with whom he appeared in the 2000 film The Yards) as Ennis Del Mar and Jack Twist, respectively, but both actors were uncomfortable with the film's sex scenes. The roles ultimately went to Heath Ledger and Jake Gyllenhaal, both of whom were nominated for Academy Awards for their performances.

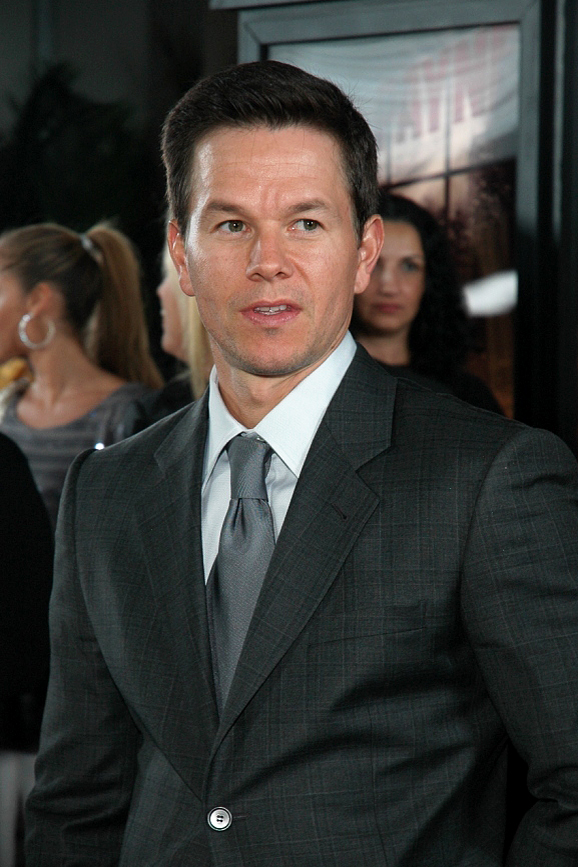
Wahlberg at the premiere of Max Payne in 2008

Wahlberg starred in the American football drama Invincible (2006), based on the true story of bartender Vince Papale. He was also executive producer and appeared in the HBO series Entourage (2004–2011) and its follow-up film (2015), which was loosely based on his experiences in Hollywood. In 2006, he appeared as Sean Dignam, an unpleasant, foul-mouthed Massachusetts State Police staff sergeant in Martin Scorsese's critically acclaimed thriller, The Departed, which netted him an Academy Award nomination for Best Supporting Actor, a Golden Globe nomination for Best Performance by an Actor in a Supporting Role in a Motion Picture, and a National Society of Film Critics Best Supporting Actor award. Wahlberg was reunited with his The Basketball Diaries co-star Leonardo DiCaprio.

Despite his felony conviction, which legally prohibits him from handling firearms, Wahlberg prepared for his role in Shooter (2007) by attending long-range shooting training at Front Sight Firearms Training Institute near Pahrump, Nevada. He was able to hit a target at 1,100 yards on his second day, a feat which usually takes weeks to achieve. He had said in a number of interviews that he would retire at the age of 40 to concentrate on parenthood and professional golf. However, in early 2007, he indicated that the latter was no longer the plan as "his golf game is horrible". In 2007, he starred opposite Joaquin Phoenix in We Own the Night, a movie about a family of police officers in New York City.

He starred in M. Night Shyamalan's The Happening as Eliot Moore, which premiered in movie theaters on June 13, 2008. The same year, he played the title role in Max Payne, based on the video game of the same name. While promoting Max Payne, Wahlberg became involved in a playful feud with The Lonely Island's Andy Samberg. Samberg had done an impression of Wahlberg in a Saturday Night Live sketch titled "Mark Wahlberg Talks to Animals". Wahlberg later appeared in a follow-up sketch parodying the original one, Samberg's impression of Wahlberg, and his own threats to Samberg. He played Jack Salmon, the father of the protagonist, Susie, in Peter Jackson's The Lovely Bones (2009), a film adaptation of the Alice Sebold book of the same name.

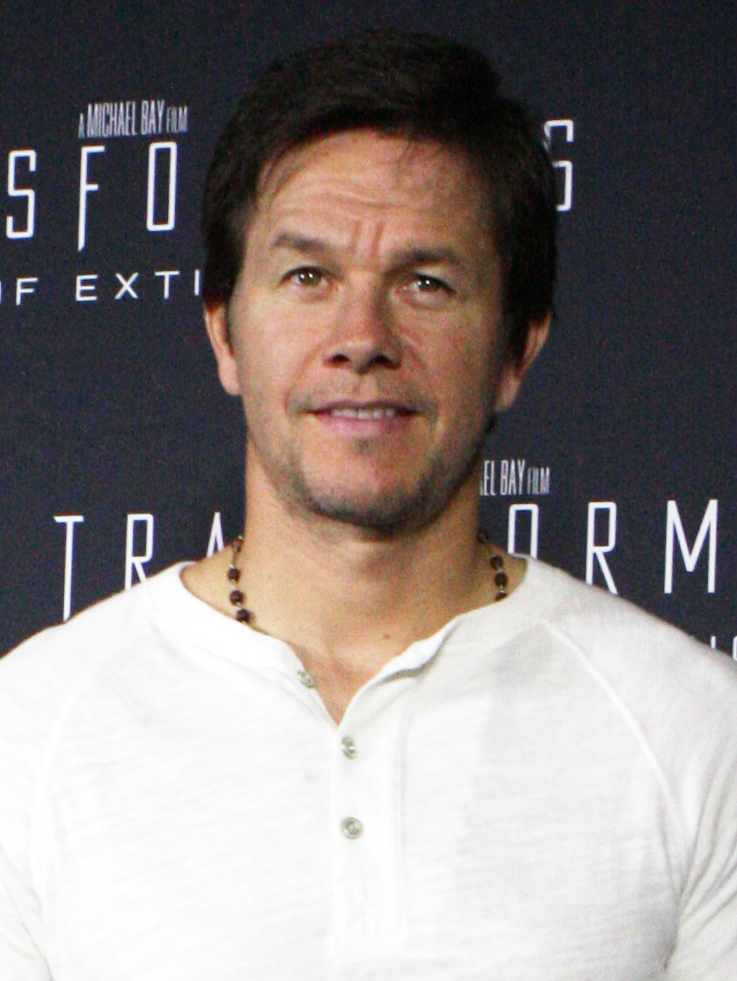
Wahlberg at the premiere of Transformers: Age of Extinction in 2014

In 2010, Wahlberg appeared with Steve Carell and Tina Fey in the romantic comedy Date Night, starred with Will Ferrell in the buddy cop film The Other Guys, and starred with Christian Bale in the boxing drama film The Fighter. In 2012, he starred as a former criminal in the action thriller Contraband, and also starred in Seth MacFarlane's hit comedy Ted, reprising his role in the 2015 sequel. Wahlberg later starred as Navy SEAL Marcus Luttrell in the war film Lone Survivor (2013), based on Luttrell's 2007 book of the same name. The film received commercial success and mostly positive reviews, and Wahlberg's performance was highly praised. Also in 2013, he starred in the true crime film Pain & Gain alongside Dwayne Johnson, and the action comedy film 2 Guns alongside Denzel Washington.

In 2014, Wahlberg starred in the remake of The Gambler, the 1974 James Caan film that was loosely inspired by the Dostoyevsky novella. Also in 2014, Wahlberg was the producer of the reality show Breaking Boston, which was pulled off the air after its premiere had 311,000 viewers. He executive-produced one episode of Wahlburgers, while co-starring in it.

Walhlberg also starred in two films in the Transformers live-action film franchise: Transformers: Age of Extinction (2014) and Transformers: The Last Knight (2017). In 2015, he starred opposite Will Ferrell in the comedy Daddy's Home, reprising his role in the 2017 sequel. In 2016, he starred in two Peter Berg films, Deepwater Horizon, a film about the 2010 Deepwater Horizon oil spill, and Patriots Day, a film about the 2013 Boston Marathon bombing.

Wahlberg topped the list of the world's highest-paid actors in 2017. In 2018, his salary of $1.5 million for the reshoots for All the Money in the World stirred a gender pay gap controversy, as his co-star Michelle Williams had received less than $1,000 for the same reshoots. Wahlberg donated the money to the Time's Up initiative, a movement against sexual harassment co-founded by Williams. In 2018, he starred in the family comedy-drama film Instant Family.

Wahlberg produced and starred in the espionage film Mile 22 (2018), and appeared in the Netflix film Spenser Confidential (2020), and the animated movie Scoob! (2020), which was his first voice acting role. In 2022, Wahlberg starred in the Uncharted film, as Victor Sullivan, having originally been cast to play Nathan Drake years prior. He then starred in the family film Arthur the King (2024), and the action films The Family Plan (2023) (followed by a 2025 sequel), The Union (2024), and Flight Risk (2025).

Besides Entourage, Wahlberg was also executive producer of the period crime drama Boardwalk Empire (2010–2014), the comedy-dramas How to Make It in America (2010–2011) and Ballers (2015–2019), and the documentary McMillions (2020).

=== Other ventures ===
==== Advertising ====
Wahlberg first displayed his physique in the "Good Vibrations" music video and most prominently in a series of underwear ads for Calvin Klein (1992) shot by Herb Ritts, following it with Calvin Klein television advertisements.

Magazine and television promotions sometimes featured Wahlberg exclusively or accompanied by model Kate Moss. Annie Leibovitz also shot a famous session of Wahlberg in underwear for Vanity Fair's annual Hall of Fame issue. He also made a workout video titled The Marky Mark Workout: Form... Focus... Fitness (ISBN 1-55510-910-1).

In 2012, Wahlberg began serving as a brand ambassador for Marked, a line of sports nutrition supplements by GNC.

In March 2017, AT&T announced that Wahlberg would become a spokesman and he would create original content for the mobile network division.

== Business interests ==
Wahlberg is a co-owner of Wahlburgers, along with his brothers Donnie and Paul. It was Mark's idea to expand Paul's restaurant in Hingham, Massachusetts into a full-fledged chain, with a reality show to promote it.

In July 2013, Wahlberg bought an equity interest of the Barbados Tridents cricket team. Wahlberg was introduced to the game by his friend Ajmal Khan, the club's chairman and Caribbean Premier League founder. Following the announcement, Wahlberg stated, "I am a huge cricket fan now. I'm excited to be a part of the Limacol Caribbean Premier League because I know cricket is huge in the Caribbean and a rich part of the region's heritage. Sports and entertainment are a powerful combination, and the LCPL will appeal to a huge audience worldwide."

In 2015, Wahlberg recruited rapper Sean Combs and billionaire Ronald Burkle to join him in investing in Aquahydrate, a bottled water brand Wahlberg discovered. Together, the three men own a majority stake in the company. Wahlberg, together with former GNC executive Tom Dowd, co-founded Performance Inspired, a sports nutrition company launched in 2016. In February 2017, Wahlberg was one of the investors who took part in a $6 million funding round for StockX, a sneaker resale marketplace. In March 2019, Wahlberg bought a stake in the F45 fitness franchise.

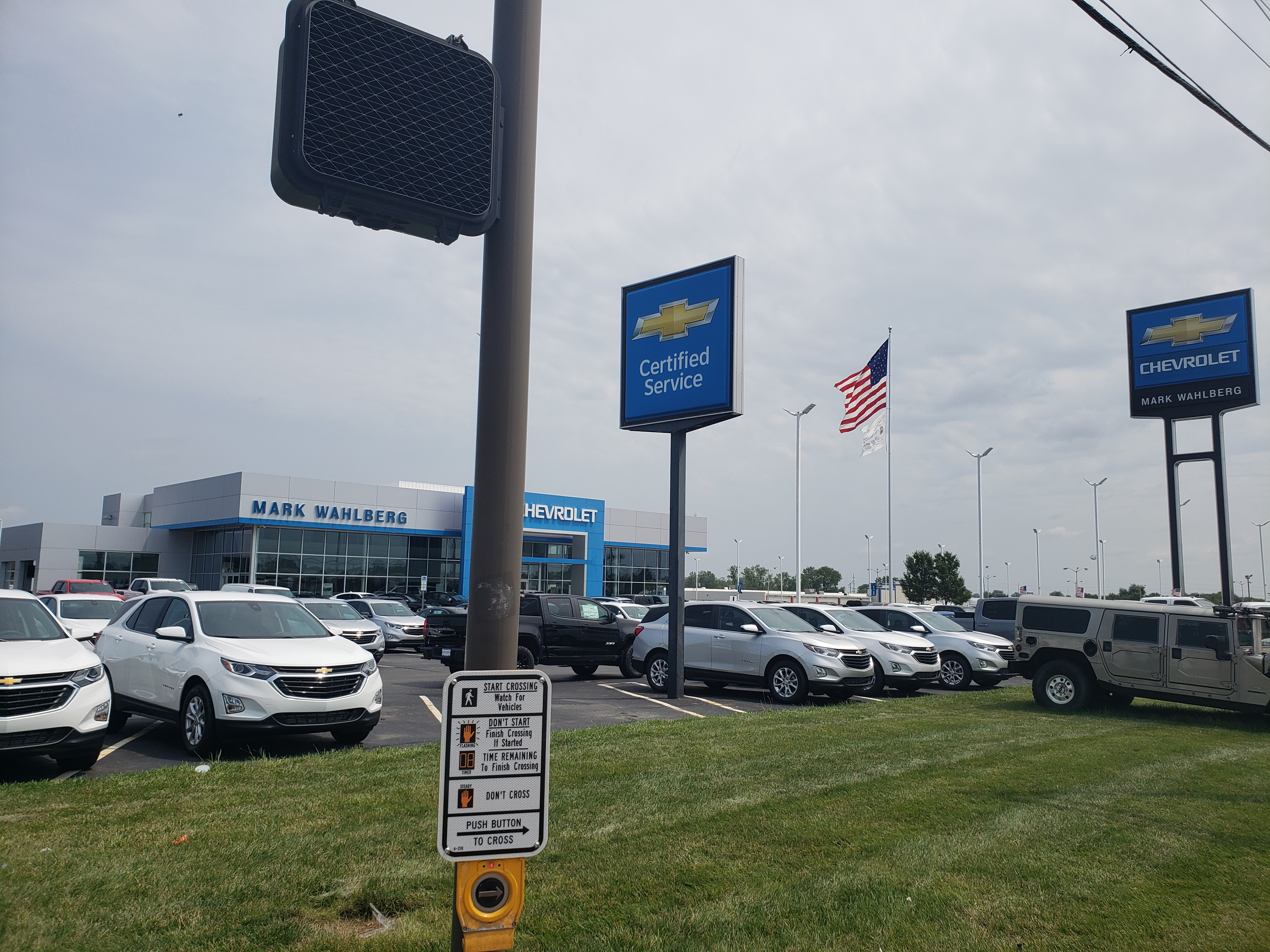
The original Mark Wahlberg Chevrolet on West Broad Street in Columbus, Ohio in 2021

On July 20, 2018, Wahlberg and his business partner, Jay Feldman, announced the purchase of Bobby Layman Chevrolet in Columbus, Ohio. The dealership was renamed Mark Wahlberg Chevrolet. Due to the success of the dealership, local ABC affiliate WSYX reported in March 2020 that Haydocy Buick-GMC, right across the street from Mark Wahlberg Chevrolet, had filed paperwork with Ohio Secretary of State Frank LaRose to rename itself Mark Wahlberg Buick-GMC; Feldman later confirmed that he and Wahlberg were purchasing their second General Motors dealership in the city. The deal became official on June 29, 2020, and also included Haydocy's Airstream and RV dealership, located next door at the car dealership's former Oldsmobile showroom. Shortly afterward, Wahlberg and Feldman announced they were purchasing Jack Maxton Chevrolet in nearby Worthington, Ohio, their fourth Columbus-area dealership, with plans to rename it Mark Wahlberg Chevrolet of Worthington. A fifth dealership, Mark Wahlberg Chevrolet of Avon, was added in Avon, Ohio in July 2021; unlike the other dealerships, the Avon location is in Greater Cleveland, marking Wahlberg and Feldman's entry into Northeast Ohio.

In 2021, Wahlberg, along with his producing partner/manager Stephen Levinson, launched Ballers Report, an online platform (and spin-off of their HBO series Ballers) that features inspiring business, entertainment and sports articles, videos and podcasts.

In 2021, he invested in the Tequila brand Flecha Azul.

In 2023, Wahlberg became Chief Brand Officer for F45 Training.

== Legal issues ==
Wahlberg took part in racially motivated attacks as a teenager, in 1986 and 1988. In June 1986, 15-year-old Wahlberg and three friends chased three black children while yelling "Kill the nigger, kill the nigger" and throwing rocks at them. The next day, Wahlberg and the others followed a group of mostly black fourth-graders (including a victim from the previous day) taking a field trip on a beach, yelled racial epithets, threw rocks at them, and "summoned other white males who joined" in the harassment. In August 1986, civil action was filed against Wahlberg for violating the civil rights of his victims, and Wahlberg and his friends were issued a civil rights injunction which served as a warning that they would be jailed if they committed another hate crime.

In April 1988, Wahlberg, then 16, assaulted a middle-aged Vietnamese-American man on the street, calling him a "Vietnam fucking shit" and knocking him unconscious with a large wooden stick. Later the same day, he attacked Johnny Trinh, another Vietnamese-American, punching him in the eye. When Wahlberg was arrested and returned to the scene of the first assault, he told police officers: "I'll tell you now that's the mother-fucker whose head I split open." Wahlberg later said he was on PCP at the time. Investigators noted that Wahlberg "made numerous unsolicited racial statements about 'gooks' and 'slant-eyed gooks'". He was arrested for attempted murder. He was charged with two counts of assault and battery with a dangerous weapon, one count of marijuana possession, and criminal contempt for violating the prior civil rights injunction he received in 1986. He pleaded guilty to felony assault and was sentenced to three months in jail, but served only 45 days of his sentence. Wahlberg believed he had left the second victim permanently blind in one eye, though Trinh later said that he had actually lost his eye during the Vietnam War while serving in the Army of the Republic of Vietnam.

In August 1992, Wahlberg fractured the jaw of his neighbor Robert Crehan. Court documents state that Wahlberg, "without provocation or cause, viciously and repeatedly kicked" Crehan in the face, while another man, Derek McCall, held the victim on the ground. Wahlberg's attorney claimed that Wahlberg and McCall, who is Black, were provoked after McCall was called a racial slur by Crehan. The lawsuit was settled between the two parties, avoiding a criminal trial.

In 2006, Wahlberg said the right thing for him to do would be to meet with Trinh and make amends. Wahlberg engendered controversy in 2014 by applying for a pardon for his convictions from the State of Massachusetts. According to the BBC, the debate about his suitability for a pardon raised "difficult issues, with the arguments on both sides being far-reaching and complex". Wahlberg later said he regretted the attempt to obtain a pardon, and his petition was closed after he failed to answer a request from the pardon board as to whether he wanted it to remain open. In 2016, Wahlberg said he had met with Trinh and apologized "for those horrific acts". Trinh released a public statement forgiving Wahlberg.

== Personal life ==
Wahlberg started dating Rhea Durham in 2001. They had three children during the first seven years of their relationship, and married on August 1, 2009, at the Good Shepherd Catholic Church in Beverly Hills, near where they lived. They had another child five months after their wedding in January 2010.

Wahlberg was booked to fly on American Airlines Flight 11 on September 11, 2001, but changed his plans the day before and travelled instead to Toronto to attend the Toronto International Film Festival. He received backlash for stating in a 2012 interview, "If I was on that plane with my kids, it wouldn't have went [sic] down like it did". He added that "there would have been a lot of blood in that first-class cabin and then me saying, 'OK, we're going to land somewhere safely, don't worry.'" He issued an apology after family members of those killed on the flight expressed outrage.

Wahlberg is Catholic, and has described his religion as "the most important part" of his life; he goes to Mass twice on Sundays. He fervently supports same-sex marriage despite the Church's opposition. In September 2015, he apologized to Pope Francis over the crude jokes he made in the film Ted, and he stated in an interview with Cardinal Blase Cupich of Chicago in 2017 that he sought forgiveness from God for playing a porn star in Boogie Nights. He later stated on Andy Cohen's radio show that the interview "was a joke taken too seriously". In 2023, Wahlberg stated that the Christian practices of fasting and prayer during Lent were meaningful to him, as he discussed using the Hallow Christian prayer app.

Wahlberg established the Mark Wahlberg Youth Foundation in May 2001 for the purpose of raising and distributing funds to youth service and enrichment programs. Wahlberg is active with The Good Shepherd Center for Homeless Women and Children.

In 2022, Wahlberg and his family moved from Hollywood to Las Vegas.

== Discography ==
=== Solo singles ===
Year	Title	Peak chart positions			Album
Year	Title	FIN	GER	SWI	Album
1995	"No Mercy"	—	44	37	Non-album singles
1996	"Hey DJ"	17	58	—	Non-album singles
1997	"Feel the Vibe"	—	—	—	Non-album singles
1997	"Best of My Love"	—	—	—	Non-album singles
"—" denotes releases that did not chart or were not released
