= Prince Ital Joe =

Dominican singer (1963–2001)

Background information
- Born: Joseph Paquette; May 5, 1963; Roseau, Dominica
- Died: May 16, 2001 (aged 38) Phoenix, Arizona, U.S.
- Genres: Reggae; ragga; Eurodance; hip-hop
- Occupations: Singer; actor
- Years active: 1988–2001
- Labels: Ultraphonic Records; Death Row; Interscope

Joseph Paquette (May 5, 1963 – May 16, 2001), better known by his stage name Prince Ital Joe, was a Dominican reggae and ragga singer and actor best known for his collaborations with Marky Mark and Death Row Records artists. Prince Ital Joe also appeared in the Steven Seagal film, Marked for Death and on the TV series, EZ Streets and Players.

== Life and career ==
Prince Ital Joe was born in the Commonwealth of Dominica, and moved to Brooklyn, New York, at the age of 13 with his parents in 1976. After completing high school, Joe moved to California to pursue his dreams of acting and entertainment. Before getting into the music business, Joe worked for over ten years performing at private Hollywood parties and clubs and from 1988 to 1990 as a concert promoter in the Caribbean for acts like Ziggy Marley.

In 1993, he teamed up with rapper Marky Mark and released two albums 1994's Life in the Streets and 1995's The Remix Album.

After The Remix album, the duo split up with Joe signing with Death Row Records. He appeared on several Death Row releases including Tha Dogg Pound's Dogg Food, 2Pac's (under his "Makaveli" moniker) The Don Killuminati: The 7 Day Theory and Daz Dillinger's Retaliation, Revenge & Get Back, most notably providing vocals on 2Pac's hit "Hail Mary." A solo album was in the works at Death Row, with Joe recording songs with Snoop Doggy Dogg, Nate Dogg, Yo-Yo, Coolio and K-Ci among others for the project, but the album was shelved following 2Pac's death and label head Suge Knight's subsequent arrest.

== Personal life ==
Prince Ital Joe married Paulina Paquette and had a daughter, Princess Nashida Paquette.

Prince Ital Joe died on May 16, 2001, from injuries sustained in a car accident that happened on a highway near Phoenix, Arizona, while en route to Los Angeles. He was 38 years old.

== Discography ==
=== Studio albums ===
Prince Ital Joe and Marky Mark

Year	Album	Peak chart positions				Certifications
Year	Album	AUT	GER	SWI	EUR	Certifications
1994	Life in the Streets	21	10	42	—	

=== Remix albums ===
Prince Ital Joe and Marky Mark

Year	Album	Peak chart positions				Certifications
Year	Album	AUT	GER	SWI	EUR	Certifications
1995	The Remix Album	—	—	—	—	

=== Singles ===
Prince Ital Joe and Marky Mark

Year	Single	Peak chart positions									Certifications	Album
Year	Single	AUT	BEL (Vl)	DEN	FIN	GER	NED	SWI	SWE	EUR	Certifications	Album
1993	"Happy People"	23	—	—	8	4	—	22	24	22	GER: Gold	Life in the Streets
1994	"Life in the Streets"	—	—	—	8	11	—	5	36	58	GER: Gold	Life in the Streets
1994	"United"	6	23	7	10	1	7	9	6	9	GER: Gold	Life in the Streets
1995	"Babylon"	—	—	—	11	17	—	35	—	94		Life in the Streets
1995	"Rastaman Vibration"	—	—	—	—	—	—	—	—	—		Life in the Streets
"—" denotes a recording that did not chart.

=== Other related releases ===
- 1999 : Prince Ital Joe feat. W.C. - "Stereo Type" (Unreleased Death Row Records Track)
- 1999 : Prince Ital Joe feat. Kurupt & Coolio - "2Pac Tribute" (Unreleased Death Row Records Track)
- 1999 : Prince Ital Joe feat. Daz Dillinger - "Watcha Gonna Do" (Unreleased Death Row Records Track)
