= List of prematurely reported obituaries =

List of obituaries published before the subject was deceased

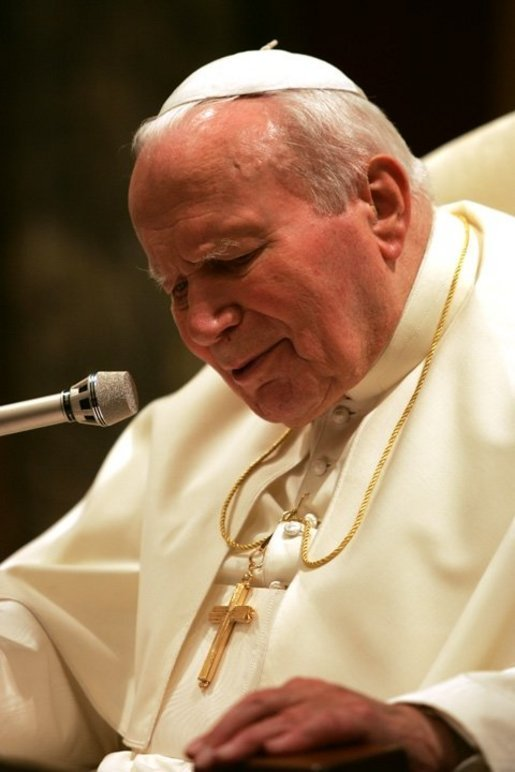
Pope John Paul II was the subject of three premature obituaries.

A prematurely reported obituary is an obituary of someone who was still alive at the time of publication. Examples include that of inventor and philanthropist Alfred Nobel, whose premature obituary condemning him as a "merchant of death" for creating military explosives may have prompted him to create the Nobel Prize; black nationalist Marcus Garvey, whose actual death may have been precipitated by reading his own obituary; and actor Abe Vigoda, who was the subject of so many death reports and rumours that a website was created to state whether he was alive or dead.

This article lists the recipients of incorrect death reports (not just formal obituaries) from publications, media organisations, official bodies, and widely used information sources; but not mere rumours of deaths. People who were presumed (though not categorically declared) to be dead, and joke death reports that were widely believed, are also included.

== Causes ==
Premature obituaries may be published for reasons such as the following:

- Accidental publication: release of a pre-written draft obituary, usually on a news website, as a result of technical or human error. Notable cases include CNN incorrectly reporting the death of seven major world figures in 2003, and in 2020 when Radio France Internationale published as many as 100 premature obituaries.
- Brush with death: when the subject unexpectedly survives a life-threatening illness or injury which made the person appear to be dead or certain to die; or if they were really dying but not yet dead at the time of publication.
- Clerical errors: due to clerical errors, almost 500 living people in the United States are inadvertently considered dead each month by the Social Security Administration.
- Faked death: when the subject fakes their own death in order to evade legal, financial, or marital difficulties and start a new life.
- Fraud victim: many people from different countries have been registered dead by officials who are bribed by relatives who want to steal the victim's property. The ensuing legal disputes often continue for many years, with victims growing elderly and sometimes dying in reality before they are resolved (see Uttar Pradesh Association of Dead People).
- Hoax: when a death is falsely reported, either by an outside party or the subject themselves, generally as a prank.
- Impostor: when an ordinary person who for years has passed themselves off to family and friends as a retired minor celebrity dies, it can prompt an erroneous obituary for the real (but still living) celebrity.
- Misidentified body: when a corpse is misidentified as someone else, often someone who was involved in the same incident or who happened to go missing at the same time.
- Missing in action: soldiers who go missing in war are sometimes incorrectly declared dead if no body is found. In particular, a number of Japanese soldiers thought to have died in World War II in fact survived—typically hiding in a remote jungle for years or even decades, believing that the war had not ended.
- Misunderstandings: such as when a Sky News employee thought that a rehearsal for the future death of the Queen Mother was real.
- Name confusion: where someone with an identical or similar name has died. Usually the subject of the obituary is famous but the deceased person is not.
- Procedural death: when a person who is not dead is purposely declared legally dead by the government. In 1866, the Kingdom of Hawaii established a policy of declaring the kingdom's lepers legally dead, quarantining them in the leper colony Kalaupapa with no visitors for the rest of their lives.

== A ==
- Alan Abel reported his own death in a skiing accident as an elaborate hoax on New Year's Day, 1980, to get his obituary published in The New York Times. Abel died on September 14, 2018.
- Abu Bakr al-Baghdadi, terrorist leader of ISIL, was erroneously reported dead, injured or arrested numerous times over a number of years by various governments, in media, and on Wikipedia, before his death in 2019.
- Mahmoud Ahmadinejad the former President of Iran was reported killed due to a missile strike in Tehran from various news sources on the ongoing war between Israel and the United States against Iran. However, his assistant confirmed that he survived the attack.

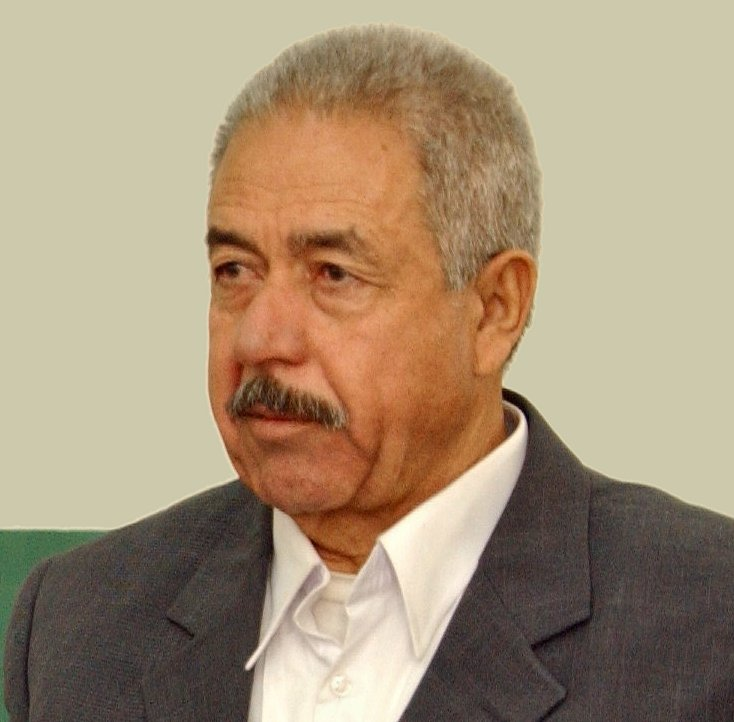
Ali Hassan al-Majid was supposedly killed in the 2003 invasion of Iraq, before he was eventually captured and sentenced to death by hanging.

- Ali Hassan al-Majid was supposedly dead in April 2003, after British and United States officials reported that he had died in an air strike in Basra; al-Majid had been seen going into the building that was attacked, and corpses of his bodyguards were positively identified, though there was less certainty about the identity of al-Majid's supposed corpse. After obituaries of the Iraqi general, politician and first-cousin of Saddam Hussein were published in many newspapers, reports then circulated that he had escaped by boat, and subsequently been seen joking with staff in a hospital in Baghdad. Al-Majid was captured several months later, and sentenced to death in 2007 for war crimes. He was hanged on January 25, 2010.
- Nicholas Alahverdian, an American activist and sex offender, faked his own death in February 2020 but was discovered alive in Scotland in October 2021. He died in June 2026.
- Buzz Aldrin, on October 31, 2025, during a discussion about Kim Kardashian's comments claiming the moon landing was faked, CBS Mornings, host Tony Dokoupil mistakely stated that the astronaut was dead. He was quickly corrected by his cohost Nate Burleson and Dokoupil apologized for the error.
- Rex Alston, a retired BBC sports commentator, garnered the unusual distinction of having his marriage announced in The Times the year after that paper had published his obituary, when his internal obituary file was updated and accidentally published in 1985. Alston was 84 at the time and lived another nine years until his actual death at 93 in 1994.
- Pamela Anderson, Canadian-American actress, was reported to have died on March 12, 2018, when a website impersonating ABC News reported that Anderson died after collapsing in her home.
- Kris Aquino, Filipino actress and member of the Aquino political family. A Facebook post in late August 2025 reported that she had died, but it was later revealed that she was still alive, and had undergone a successful blood clot surgery. She is living as of 2025.
- Rowan Atkinson was falsely reported as dead numerous times. His death in a car accident was proven untrue in 2012, and around one year later, a death hoax was that he committed suicide after being turned down. These hoaxes recirculated online in 2016, 2017 and 2018.

== B ==
- Arkady Babchenko, a Russian journalist living in Ukraine, was widely reported on May 29, 2018 to have been shot dead. A day later, Babchenko appeared at a press conference with the Security Service of Ukraine, claiming to have staged his death to expose Russian agents.
- Lawrence Joseph Bader, an Akron, Ohio, kitchenware salesman who faked death by drowning. On May 15, 1957, he left his wife Mary Lou (then five months pregnant), their three children, and five years of unpaid income taxes, sailed out on Lake Erie, and vanished (right after increasing his life insurance policy). His boat was found abandoned, and the Coast Guard announced that no one could have survived. In 1960, he was pronounced dead. He turned up in Omaha, Nebraska, as married broadcaster John "Fritz" Johnson. He was found by his 21-year-old niece, and caught when his fingerprints matched those of Bader; "Johnson" insisted the rest of his life that he had no recollection of his life as Bader. He died of a tumor in 1966; the cancer, which had caused his eye to be removed in 1964, may have preexisted before then and caused genuine amnesia.
- William Baer, a New York University professor, was declared dead by his New York Times obituary in May 1942 as a hoax by his students.
- Bill Bailey: The BBC website reported the death of the British comedian in May 2016, getting his age incorrect in the report. In a 2018 appearance on the BBC's The Graham Norton Show, Bailey suggested that the report was the result of confusion following the death of a DJ in Kentucky also named Bill Bailey.
- Scott Baio: A hoax report circulated via e-mail claimed that this American actor had died in a car accident on December 18, 1997. The report was picked up by some media outlets, even causing several members of Baio's family to briefly believe he was dead.
- Josephine Baker: The entertainer was reported in 1942 to have died in Morocco of a "lingering illness". The reports were later disproven; Baker died in 1975.
- Sabine Baring-Gould, English author, had his obituary published in The New York Times on June 5, 1906; Baring-Gould died in 1924.
- Mandela Barnes, a former member of the Wisconsin State Assembly and the Democratic nominee for Lieutenant Governor of Wisconsin in the 2018 election for governor and lieutenant governor in Wisconsin, was erroneously reported as having been killed in a motorcycle crash north of Milwaukee. The error was caused by a photo of Barnes incorrectly being broadcast by the CBS affiliate in Milwaukee during a local news report about a different person being killed in a motorcycle crash.
- Lem Barney, a Pro Football Hall of Fame member who played 11 seasons with the Detroit Lions, has been subject to multiple false reports of his death in 2025; a November 29 report was erroneously reported as true by the Hall of Fame and came shortly after a previous report had claimed he had died in a flood.
- P. T. Barnum's premature obituary was published, unusually, not because of deception or error, but sympathy. When he took to his deathbed, Barnum expressed the wish that he might read what the papers would say about him. The New York Evening Sun obligingly printed his obituary on March 24, 1891, two weeks before his actual death on April 7. The newspaper acknowledged to its readers that Barnum was still alive at the time of publication.
- Edward Bartlett was reported in the 1934 edition of Wisden Cricketers' Almanack to have died "about February" the previous year. In fact, he lived until December 21, 1976.
- John Basedow was reported by PRWeb to have died in Thailand due to the tsunami resulting from the 2004 Indian Ocean earthquake; the story was quickly retracted.
- Billy Ray Bates, a basketball player who played in the NBA between 1980 and 1983 and in several other leagues afterwards, was referred to by Shaquille O'Neal on a live segment of Inside the NBA in April 2025 as having died. Charles Barkley, a fellow panelist on the show, had wondered aloud whether Bates was still alive. "I'm doing good for a dead man", Bates told NJ Advance Media. Ernie Johnson Jr., the host of Inside, apologized for the premature obituary, but O'Neal and Barkley did not.
- Charles Baudelaire, a French poet, was reported to have died by Paris newspapers in April 1866, after suffering a massive stroke while in Belgium. He died the following year.
- Beyoncé: On February 23, 2015, a fake news report surfaced on Twitter claiming that the singer was killed in a car crash. The report caused the hashtag #RIPBeyonce to become trending on Twitter.
- Lal Bihari is the Indian founder of the Uttar Pradesh Association of Dead People, an organisation which highlights the plight of people in Uttar Pradesh who are incorrectly declared dead by relatives in order to steal their land, usually in collusion with corrupt officials. Bihari himself was officially dead from 1976 to 1994 as a result of his uncle's attempt to acquire his land. Among various attempts to publicize his situation and demonstrate that he was alive, he stood for election against Rajiv Gandhi in 1989 (and lost). He was awarded the Ig Nobel Peace Prize in 2003 for his 'posthumous' activities.
- Bushwick Bill, rapper best known for being a member of the Houston hip-hop trio Geto Boys was mistakenly reported dead on June 9, 2019, while battling pancreatic cancer, but this was debunked by his son. However, he would die later that day.

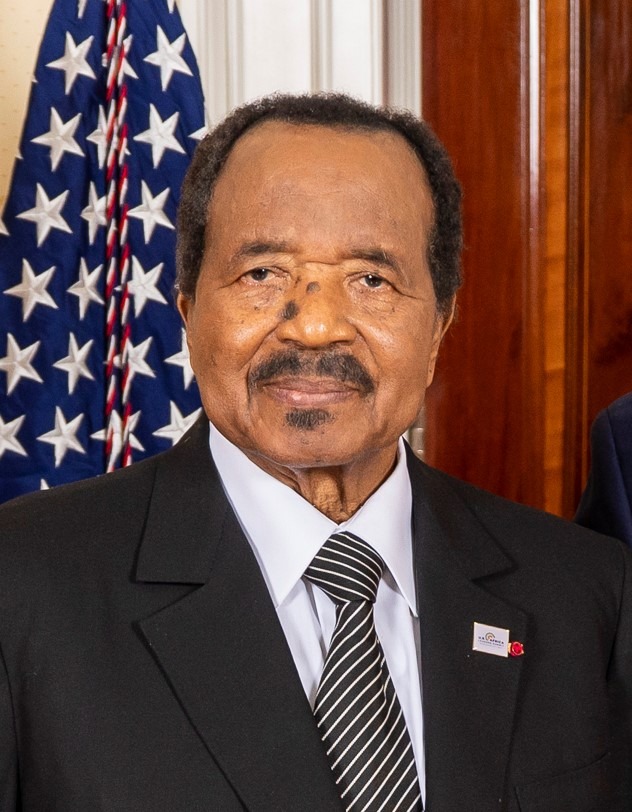
Paul Biya was rumored or reported dead at least 13 times during his rule as president of Cameroon.

- Paul Biya: On June 3, 2004, the president of Cameroon was reported to have died by two websites based in the United States, while he was in Switzerland on a private visit. Biya had previously been the subject of eleven death rumors since taking office in 1982, according to a thesis by Nga Ndongo of the University of Yaoundé. On October 7, 2024, Biya's death was again reported by ABS Africa TV, a private television channel based in Houston with links to the Ambazonian independence movement.
- Biz Markie, rapper known for his 1989 single "Just a Friend". In December 2020, it was reported that Markie was staying in a rehabilitation facility as a result of a stroke he had suffered after going into a diabetic coma. On July 1, 2021, rumors of his death circulated on Twitter. His representative told Rolling Stone, "The news of Biz Markie's death is not true, Biz is still under medical care, surrounded by professionals who are working hard to provide the best healthcare possible." Markie died at a Baltimore hospital fifteen days later, on July 16, at age 57.
- Jack Black. On June 4, 2016, the Twitter page of Black's band Tenacious D announced the actor and musician's death. However, the next day both Black and bandmate Kyle Gass clarified that the page was hacked and that Black was alive and well.
- Paul Blais, a US Air Force senior airman, was listed as one of 19 people believed killed in the 1996 Khobar Towers bombing. However, it transpired that he was alive, though in a coma, having been confused with another airman who had died.
- Rudy Boesch: The Navy SEAL, best known for his appearances on the U.S. reality competition Survivor, was falsely reported dead in August 2019. Boesch, who was in the late stages of Alzheimer's disease at the time, died three months later.
- Omar Bongo: On June 8, 2009, Agence France-Presse, Spanish media outlets and Le Point reported that the president of Gabon had died at a clinic in Barcelona earlier that day, although these were denied by prime minister Jean Eyeghé Ndong. Bongo's death was confirmed later that day.
- Jon Bon Jovi: singer of the rock band Bon Jovi. On April 18, 2025, rumors on social media circled that Bon Jovi had died when in actuality it was a miscommunication regarding news reports on the death of Ioannis Vasilopoulos, who had created artwork for several Bon Jovi albums.
- Subhas Chandra Bose: The Indian nationalist leader, who sought support from the Axis powers during World War II, was reported on March 28, 1942, to have died in an airplane crash off the coast of Japan. In response, Mahatma Gandhi sent a message of condolence to Bose's mother. Bose actually died as a result of an airplane crash, but in Japanese-occupied Taiwan three years later, on August 18, 1945.
- Lucien Bouchard: the former Quebec premier (who had been seriously ill) was reported dead by CTV in September 2005. The network began broadcasting a live tribute to the politician, but cut it short with a sheepish confirmation that he was in fact alive, blaming a report from Radio-Canada for the error. However, Radio-Canada had never reported that Bouchard had died, and quickly sent out a press release insisting on an apology. CTV later retracted the statement blaming Radio-Canada, without ever confirming how they themselves had come to make the mistake.
- Peter Boyle, a TV and film actor, was briefly and incorrectly declared deceased in October 1990, a few weeks following a massive stroke that almost paralyzed him and left him unable to move or speak for nearly six months. His incorrect lifespan of 1933–1990 is listed in the book Cult Movie Stars by author Danny Peary. Boyle made a complete recovery from the blood clot in his brain and continued acting despite multiple persistent health problems, including high blood pressure. He had another brush with death in 1999, when he suffered a heart attack while working on the set of the sitcom Everybody Loves Raymond, but he again recovered and was working again within one week. Boyle died on December 12, 2006.
- James Brady, White House Press Secretary, was shot in the head during the 1981 assassination attempt of President Ronald Reagan. Three hours later, amid confusion about the extent of his injuries, all three U.S. broadcast TV networks erroneously announced that Brady had died, triggering an on-air outburst by ABC News anchor Frank Reynolds when the information was revealed incorrect. This led to greater subsequent caution about issuing death reports during rapidly developing situations. Brady died on August 4, 2014, 33 years after the shooting. His death was ruled to be a homicide, since it was ultimately caused by his injury.
- Gordon Brown: Following the death of footballer Gordon Banks on February 12, 2019, Sky News presenter Adam Boulton erroneously reported that the former prime minister of the United Kingdom had died. Boulton corrected himself a few seconds later.
- Adam Buckley: The resident of Santa Clarita, California, who had schizophrenia, went missing in June 2018. On July 2, a burned body was found in Lancaster, and the Los Angeles County Coroner misidentified the body as being Buckley's. In late August, the Coroner released a statement saying that they had misidentified the body, and Buckley was found alive on September 14.
- Muhammadu Buhari, President of Nigeria, has been the subject of persistent rumors that he had died and been replaced by a body double after experiencing ill health in 2017. Buhari, 74 years old at the time, suspected the false rumors were ginned up and revived in 2018 by opposing politicians seeking the office in the 2019 presidential election. Buhari died on July 13, 2025, two years after leaving office.
- Rodger Bumpass (voice actor of Squidward Tentacles): Reported in August 2006 to have died during heart surgery by Jonesboro, Arkansas, station KAIT, the Internet Movie Database, and Arkansas State University's newsletter.
- Medrick Burnett Jr., a linebacker for the Alabama A&M Bulldogs college football team, suffered a head injury on October 26, 2024 in a game against rival Alabama State. Alabama A&M mistakenly reported him deceased on Tuesday, November 26, 2024 based on a tip "from an immediate family member on Tuesday evening", then retracted the announcement the following day when it was learned that he was still alive. He died on the night of November 27, which was formally reported on November 29.
- John Burney: Shortly after the collapse of his business, this resident of Helena, Arkansas, disappeared on June 11, 1976. He was eventually declared dead, which allowed both his wife and his company to receive life insurance benefits. However, Burney resurfaced in December 1982 when he visited his father who had recently been injured in an accident. In the intervening years, Burney had taken up residence in Key Largo, Florida, under the name John Bruce and had married a second wife without ever divorcing his first one. He was eventually convicted of fraud.
- Pat Burns, an NHL coach, was reported to have died from cancer on September 17, 2010, by the Toronto Star. He actually died two months later on November 19.
- Steve Burns, host of children's show Blue's Clues, was rumored to have died from a drug overdose in 1998; others claimed that Burns was struck and killed by a car. Burns went on The Rosie O'Donnell Show to debunk those rumors.
- Barbara Bush, former First Lady of the United States, had a draft obituary (conspicuously marked "DO NOT PUBLISH") leaked by CBSNews.com on April 15, 2018, after her family announced that she was in failing health and ending further medical treatment. The following day, a fake news website pretending to be CNN.com falsely claimed Bush had died. Bush died two days after that, on April 17.
- George H. W. Bush was erroneously reported dead in an e-mail by WBAP-AM/WBAP-FM, due to a false tip. At the time, Bush was in intensive care recovering from illness. The German magazine Der Spiegel erroneously published a draft obituary for Bush on December 30, 2012, during his recovery from the same illness. Bush had previously been the subject of another near-miss while President, when CNN Headline News almost reported a false tip stating Bush had died. Another death hoax circulated in July 2014, when it was reported that Bush had died from food poisoning. Bush died on November 30, 2018.
- In 2009, a moving banner headline on the South African television channel ETV News read "George Bush is dead" in 2009, after a technician who was testing the banner accidentally pressed the "broadcast live for transmission" button. The subject was implied by the BBC to be George W. Bush, son of former president George H. W. Bush. George W. Bush is still alive as of 2026.

== C ==
- Janelle Cahoon: in December 2005, the Duluth News Tribune claimed that the Benedictine nun's funeral had been shown in a 1999 documentary. The mistake caused much amusement at her monastery, with some sisters asking her what heaven was like, and others referring to the incident as "Dead Nun Walking".
- Mark Calaway (professional wrestler better known as The Undertaker): On April 17, 2014, rumors claimed that Calaway was found dead in his New Mexico home.
- Carlos Camejo, a Venezuelan man declared dead in September 2007 after a traffic accident, revived during his autopsy. After making an incision in his face, examiners realized something was wrong when he started bleeding. "I woke up because the pain was unbearable", Camejo said.
- Graham Cardwell, a Lincolnshire dockmaster who disappeared in September 1998 and was assumed drowned. Eight months later, he was discovered living in secret in the West Midlands. He claimed he had thought he was suffering from cancer (though had not sought medical attention) and wanted to spare his family the trauma of it.
- David Cameron, at the time Prime Minister of the United Kingdom, was accidentally announced to have died in January 2016 by a newsreader on Heart Radio Scotland; the announcer intended to announce the death of David Bowie.
- Feliberto Carrasco, this 81-year-old Chilean man woke up in his coffin at his own wake in January 2008. His family had found his body lying limp and cold, and assumed he must have died. While he was lying in his coffin, dressed in a suit and surrounded by relatives, his nephew saw him wake up, though did not believe it at first. Carrasco said he was not in any pain and asked for a glass of water. His death had been announced on a local radio station, which issued a correction.
- Jimmy Carter, the former President of the United States was falsely reported dead on July 23, 2024, in a hoax that was posted to X (formerly Twitter). The post, formatted as a letter from Carter's office, claimed that he died early that morning. It contained critical assessments of his presidency and featured a joke-filled statement said to be written by Carter after the death of his wife, Rosalynn Carter. The statement's alt text admitted that it was a hoax and said it was "an experiment to see how gullible people are to sensationalist headlines"; U.S. Senator Mike Lee initially reposted the statement and issued a statement of condolence before later deleting it. Carter died later that year, on December 29, 2024.
- Jan Caubergh: Belgian serial killer, sentenced to life imprisonment for his crimes. On November 5, 2013, Caubergh was reported to have died at the age of 79 while incarcerated in Bruges prison by several Belgian media outlets. A few days later, the Belgian Prison System said that this was false and that Caubergh was still alive, serving his sentence at Bruges prison. Less than a month later, Caubergh died on November 29, 2013 in Bruges prison at the age of 79. By the time Caubergh had died, he was Belgium's oldest detainee.
- John Cena, American professional wrestler and actor, has been the subject of repeated online death hoaxes since 2012, the same year he was involved in a minor car accident. Hoaxes claiming that Cena died in an accident circulated in 2012 and 2016 by a website impersonating TMZ. Other hoaxes involving Cena included a report that he died from a head injury while training for a WWE match in 2013, and one that claimed that he died of COVID-19 in 2021, both of which gained traction on Facebook.
- Whitney Cerak: a student was thought to have died in April 2006 when a van from Taylor University collided with a tractor trailer, leaving five dead. Fourteen hundred people attended her funeral. Fellow student Laura Van Ryn was thought to have survived the accident, which left her in a coma and heavily bandaged. Suspicions were only aroused when during her gradual recovery in the hospital, Van Ryn started making strange comments and using names "wrongly"; her university roommate also reported that she did not appear to be Van Ryn. Weeks after the accident, when concerned hospital staff asked her her name, she wrote "Whitney Cerak", which was confirmed by dental records. The tragic mix-up appeared to have been caused by Cerak's and Van Ryn's somewhat similar appearance, and confusion at the crash scene. Cerak co-wrote a book about her experience titled Mistaken Identity: Two Families, One Survivor, Unwavering Hope.
- Joshua Chamberlain: an American Civil War officer and Governor of Maine was shot through the hip and groin in the 1864 Siege of Petersburg, he was thought to be on the point of death, and so was reported dead by at least one newspaper (perhaps The New York Times). However, he gradually recovered in hospital. Chamberlain was shown the newspaper report 'when they thought he was able to take it', and reportedly 'got a great kick out of seeing his obituary'. He died in 1914.
- Jackie Chan: On June 20, 2013, a false report claimed that the actor had been killed in an accident while filming a movie in Austria. Another hoax article that surfaced in September of that year had also reported the same thing.
- Karen Chandler: a singer from Rexburg, Idaho, who was famous for her 1952 song "Hold Me, Thrill Me, Kiss Me" was erroneously reported to have died by the Los Angeles Daily News, on October 27, 2010. She did indeed die on November 3 of that same year.
- Jan Chapman: The 'In Memoriam' segment of the 89th Academy Awards, on February 26, 2017, included Janet Patterson, a costume designer who died in 2016. However, the segment used a photo of Chapman instead, resulting in friends and family believing that she was dead.
- King Charles III's death was falsely reported on March 18, 2024 by Russian media, as well as in Ukraine and Tajikistan. The reports claimed that the King of Britain died of cancer, for which he had commenced treatment the previous month. On May 19, 2026, a computer error at Radio Caroline accidentally activated the Death of a Monarch procedure which all British broadcast media hold in readiness, causing the station to accidentally announce the King's death and then fall silent as would be required.
- Dick Cheney: The former Vice President of the United States in the CNN.com incident. The draft obituary, which had been based on the Queen Mother's, described Cheney as 'Queen Consort' and the 'UK's favorite grandmother'. Cheney died in November 2025.
- Noam Chomsky: On June 18, 2024, rumors of Chomsky's death began spreading on social media following reports that he had suffered a stroke in 2023. Obituaries were published by at least two media outlets, The New Statesman and Jacobin. His wife later said that reports of his death were untrue.
- Winston Churchill: He suffered a stroke on January 15, 1965, and died on January 24. But on January 18, the CBC's Halifax station CBHT inadvertently broadcast a tribute that Lester Pearson had pre-recorded for transmission in case of Churchill's death. This led at least one radio station to report that Churchill had in fact died.
- Arthur C. Clarke: science fiction writer, had his obituary published by the G.R.A.A. (Goddard Retirees and Alumni Association) newsletter in April 2000. The obituary says he died on February 10, 2000, and even specifies the cause of death as pulmonary fibrosis. To date, no correction seems to have been published. Clarke died in 2008 of "respiratory complications and heart failure".
- Hillary Clinton: On September 11, 2016, WABC-TV journalist Joe Torres accidentally said that the American politician had died when reporting on a story about her falling ill at a 9/11 memorial service; Torres spoke of "Hillary Clinton's death" when he had intended to say "Hillary Clinton's health".
- Bill Clinton: On December 24, 2020, the 42nd United States President was the subject of a death hoax on Twitter with a tweet from The Reveal Report indicating he had died and their sources said his death would be made public soon. However, his wife Hillary sent Christmas wishes the same day to her followers on Instagram with no indication the former president had died.
- Colin Clive: According to Variety, the Pittsburgh Sun-Telegraph erroneously published an obituary for actor Colin Clive in 1937 after the death of a similarly named actor, Colin Chase. Clive himself died later that year at age 37.
- John Clive: His daughter mistakenly thought he died, following the death of John Lennon, whom Clive voices in the 1968 film, Yellow Submarine. He talked about this incident in an interview that was featured on the 1999 DVD. John Clive himself later died in 2012.
- Kurt Cobain: The rock musician was reported dead by CNN (though he was in fact in a coma) after an overdose in Rome in March 1994, shortly before his actual death in April.
- Samuel Taylor Coleridge: In 1816 the writer heard his death mentioned in a hotel by a man reading out a newspaper report of a coroner's inquest. He asked to see the paper and was told that "it was very extraordinary that Coleridge the poet should have hanged himself just after the success of his play [Remorse]; but he was always a strange mad fellow". Coleridge replied: "Indeed, sir, it is a most extraordinary thing that he should have hanged himself, be the subject of an inquest, and yet that he should at this moment be speaking to you." A man had been cut down from a tree in Hyde Park, and the only identification was that his shirt was marked 'S. T. Coleridge'; Coleridge thought the shirt had probably been stolen from him. Coleridge died in 1834.
- Jeffrey Combs (actor): was confused with a businessman named Jeffrey Coombs who was aboard hijacked American Airlines Flight 11, which crashed into the World Trade Center during the September 11 attacks. Combs the actor was pronounced dead by news media outlets and had to announce publicly that he was still alive.
- Sean Connery (actor): in an October 25, 1993, appearance on the Late Show with David Letterman, Connery described recent reports of his death as a result of confusion over the then-recent death of former Texas governor John Connally as well as rumours that Connery had recently undergone treatment for throat cancer. Connery died on October 31, 2020.
- Alice Cooper: in the early 1970s, Melody Maker magazine confused readers by publishing a satirical concert review of the rock musician in the form of a mock obituary. So many fans took it literally that Cooper had to issue a statement, reassuring them: "I'm alive, and drunk as usual."
- Stephanie Courtney: The actress who plays Flo in commercials by Progressive Insurance was the subject of a death hoax. On May 27, 2014, it was falsely reported that she had been killed in a car crash.
- Ion Creangă: around 1884 he suffered a severe stroke and people thought he had died. Reading his obituaries in the newspapers, Creangă reportedly said: "If this was to be the mourning I would have gotten after my death, I'm happy I haven't died yet, and so help God, may I die when people will care less about someone like me". He lived five more years, dying on December 31, 1889.
- Russell Crowe: the actor was reported as dead on a Z-100 broadcast in New York City on June 10, 2010; this was later disproven by a representative for the actor.
- Johan Cruyff: widely considered one of the best Dutch football players ever, his death was falsely reported in August 2014 when De Volkskrant accidentally uploaded a test version of their mobile website. He died on March 24, 2016, aged 68.
- Delimar Vera Cuevas: this new-born girl was declared by police to have died in a Philadelphia house fire in 1997. Six years later her mother became suspicious when a girl at a birthday party she was attending bore similarities to her other children. Subsequent DNA tests proved the girl was Delimar. Local resident Carolyn Correa is thought to have started the fire in order to kidnap her. Police could not explain why they had originally declared Delimar dead, as no human remains had been found in the fire, which had not been intense enough to completely destroy a body. The incident was dramatized in the 2004 film Little Girl Lost: The Delimar Vera Story.
- Macaulay Culkin: In November 2014, a report circulated on the internet stating that the actor had been found dead in his New York City apartment. Culkin debunked the report by posting pictures of himself on Twitter, even poking fun at the hoax by writing a caption about "the great things you can do when you're alive".
- Jason Cundy: On October 18, 2008, Talksport host Andy Goldstein stated that fellow broadcaster and former footballer Cundy had died after he was unavailable to host a show earlier in the day. While the comment was intended as a joke, some listeners were reported to have taken the comment sincerely, leading to several supporters of Cundy's former club Chelsea to offer their condolences and lay flowers outside their stadium. Talksport later apologised to Cundy and the fans for "inappropriate comments".
- George Curry, a former territorial governor of New Mexico and congressman from that state, was reported in April 1932 to have died in Hillsboro, New Mexico. Curry's son Clifford unsuccessfully sued the Albuquerque Journal for causing a heart attack upon Clifford's reading the story in the newspaper. George Curry died in 1947.
- Miley Cyrus: On September 5, 2008, a false Reuters article spread around the web claiming that the singer and entertainer had died in a car accident. This incident, which was also reported by TMZ, was quickly debunked, as she performed in concert the following Friday. A similar incident took place on November 16, 2008, when someone hacked into Cyrus' YouTube account and posted a video stating she died after being hit by a drunk driver. On September 3, 2013, messages began circulating on Facebook claiming that Miley Cyrus had committed suicide due to "traumatic stress".

== D ==
- Aden Abdullah Osman Daar: in May 2007 the first President of Somalia was erroneously reported dead by news portal SomaliNet and other websites. In reality, he was in a critical condition and on life support in a Nairobi hospital following a long illness. One source said Daar's daughter had 'assumed' he had died and had informed government officials; another blamed Nairobi medical sources. Daar died shortly afterwards on June 8, 2007.
- John Darwin: this British prison officer was presumed to have drowned in March 2002 when he disappeared while canoeing in the sea near Hartlepool. Despite a huge search operation, and the calm weather, only his paddle was found, followed weeks later by the wreckage of his canoe. An inquest declared him dead. However, in December 2007, Darwin walked into a London police station, announcing: "I think I'm a missing person", and claiming to have no memory of the past five years. Darwin's wife Anne, who had claimed his life insurance, says he turned up at their home in 2003 and lived in secret there and next door for three years. They also spent time together in Panama, where they planned to set up a hotel for canoeing holidays; she emigrated there shortly before Darwin reappeared. Both Darwin and his wife were subsequently convicted and imprisoned.
- Clarence Davis: This American football player was announced to have died on October 6, 2022, by his former team the Las Vegas Raiders. The team issued an apology later in the day, in which they confirmed Davis was still alive.
- Calvin Demarest: The pool player was incorrectly reported dead in an insane asylum in 1916 by The New York Times, which quickly retracted the claim, saying they had no idea how the error occurred. Demarest actually died in 1925.
- Thomas Dennison: after this 37-year-old Briton went missing in October 2007, a body that was found in Greater Manchester was identified by his parents and caseworker as his. After the funeral and cremation, police contacted Dennison's mother, saying they thought they had in fact found him alive and living rough in Nottingham some days earlier. To prove it, they asked her for three questions only Dennison would know the answer to; he subsequently phoned her, saying "You've buried me". The body bore an uncanny resemblance to Dennison—even with similar scars and leg ulcers—leading police to ask whether he had had a twin brother.
- Bob Denver: In the early 1960s, this American actor was reported to have died after being electrocuted when a radio fell into his bathtub. The false report apparently began as a rumor which was picked up by several media outlets. Denver later said in an interview that for years after this incident, he would often encounter people who were surprised to see him alive. Denver actually died in 2005 of complications from throat cancer.

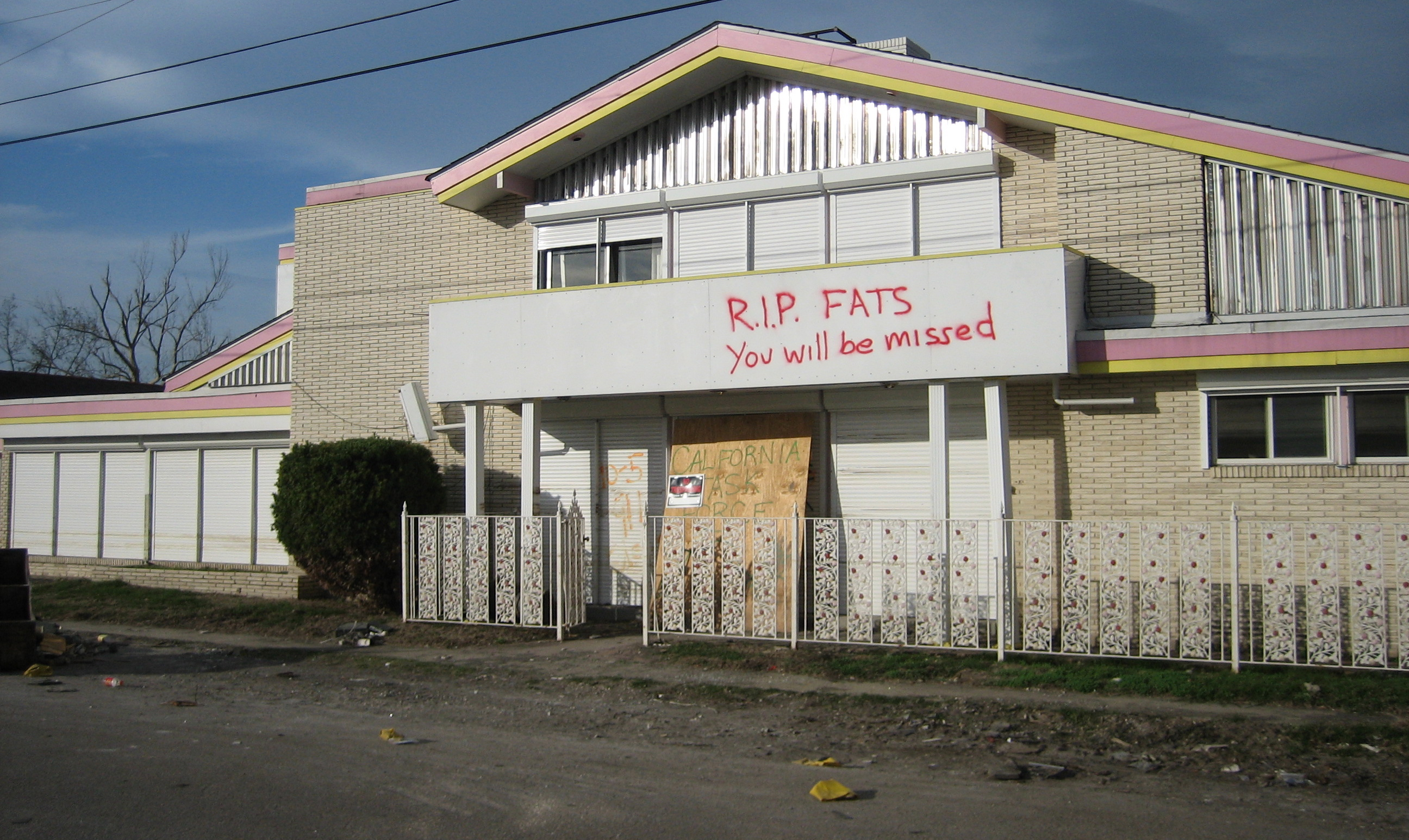
Graffiti on Fats Domino's home from his rumored death during Hurricane Katrina.

- Lord Desborough: In 1920, The Times confused the British politician with Lord Bessborough. Lord Desborough died in 1945.
- Henri Deterding: The British newspaper the Daily Mail mistakenly published the obituary of Deterding, the head of the oil company Royal Dutch Shell, on June 27, 1924, and the news was copied by The New York Times under the heading "Henry Deterding dies at film show; Director General of the Royal Dutch Company Succumbs Suddenly in The Hague". Deterding died in 1939.
- Jhulri Devi was officially declared dead in 1974 and chased off her farm by relatives in order to steal her land in Uttar Pradesh, India. After many years of legal delays, her 'death' was only annulled in 1999, by when she had reached the age of 85, after intervention by the Association of the Dead, an organisation that protests such cases. (See also Lal Bihari.)
- Lord Timothy Dexter: The self named 'lord,' eccentric Timothy Dexter was a wealthy American when he decided to fake his own death and throw a funeral. About three thousand people attended to mourn his death, and a large celebration was held, with expensive wines and fine foods. However, it was discovered that he was not in fact dead when Dexter caned his wife for smiling and not looking sad.
- Joe DiMaggio: The baseball player was reported dead in a broadcast by NBC in January 1999 as a text report running along the bottom of the television screen. The text, which DiMaggio himself saw, had been prepared following newspaper reports that DiMaggio was near death, and was transmitted when a technician pressed the wrong button. DiMaggio died in March 1999, two months after the report.

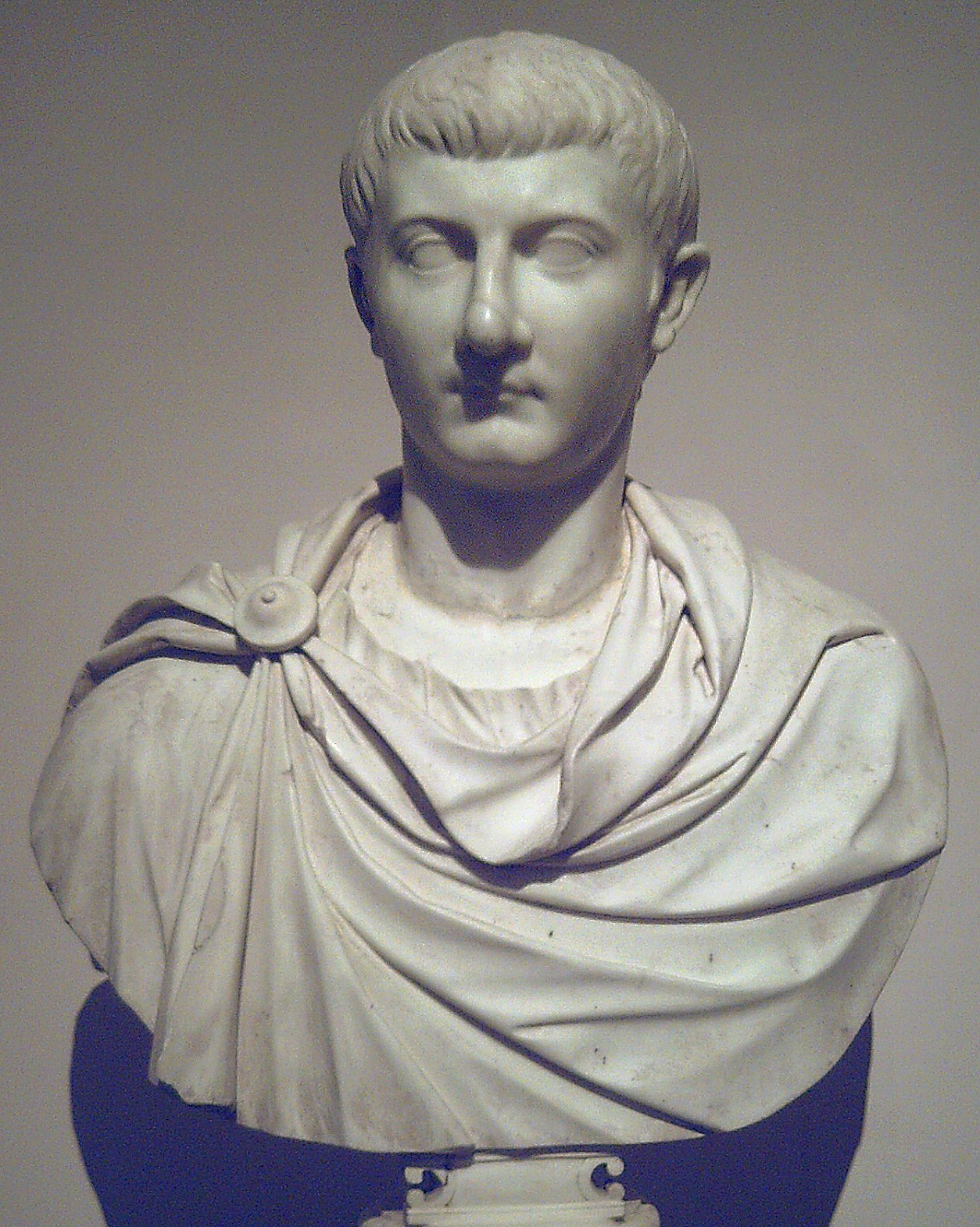
Drusus Julius Caesar: A premature poem in his memory led to the poet's execution.

- Celine Dion: On October 24, 2013, circulating messages designed to look like news headlines reported that the singer died.
- DMX: Rumors of the rapper's death spread on social media on April 8, 2021, after his friend, comedian Luenell, posted a memorial Instagram story insinuating that he had died. DMX had been in a coma since he had a heart attack on April 2. Luenell later clarified that DMX had not yet been pronounced dead, and his manager Steve Rifkind confirmed that he was still alive but on life support. DMX died the next day.
- Fats Domino: The musician was thought drowned during the Hurricane Katrina flooding that affected his Ninth Ward, New Orleans, neighborhood. After a few days, Domino reappeared, saying that he had evacuated to a friend's home in Baton Rouge. Domino died in October 2017, 12 years after the reports.
- John Donne: The poet and Dean of St Paul's Cathedral suffered a violent fever in 1630, aged about 58, and he heard the rumour that he was dead, commenting, 'A man would almost be content to die ... to hear of so much sorrow and so much good testimony from good men as I (God be blessed for it) did upon the report of my death.' He died on 31 March 1631.
- Kirk Douglas: The actor had a draft obituary of his leaked on People magazine's website on November 30, 2014, with the header "DO NOT PUB" still attached. Douglas, aged 97, was in good health at the time of the false report. Douglas died on February 5, 2020, at the age of 103, nearly 6 years after the report.
- Tony Dow: The Leave It to Beaver actor was reported to have died on July 26, 2022, from complications of liver cancer, with multiple online obituaries reporting this. Dow's wife Lauren had notified his management team that he had died, who then released an announcement of his death on his official Facebook page. However, his son later confirmed that Dow was alive in his "final hours" in hospice care. Dow died the following day, July 27.
- Hilary Duff: The Lizzie McGuire actress and singer was reported dead in August 2011 by a hoax website claiming that she fell off Kauri Cliffs in New Zealand.
- Drusus Julius Caesar: during a period of illness, the Roman politician was in 21 AD the subject of a eulogistic panegyric by the poet Clutorius Priscus, which was prematurely rehearsed in front of some noblewomen at the home of Publius Petronius. The poet, who was seeking to replicate earlier success in a panegyric written after the death of Germanicus, was himself condemned to death by the Roman Senate for anticipating the death of the Emperor's son. Drusus died by poisoning in 23 AD.
- Ian Dury: The English musician was pronounced dead on Xfm radio by Bob Geldof in 1998, possibly due to hoax information from a listener disgruntled at the station's change of ownership. The incident caused music magazine NME to call Geldof "the world's worst DJ". Dury died in March 2000.
- Danny Dyer: In January 2015, a hoax spread on Facebook claimed that the EastEnders actor had died at the age of 37. Dyer posted to Twitter to deny the rumour.
- Bob Dylan – in the early 1990s, BBC Radio 1 DJ Neale James noted that it was Dylan's birthday, and "a shame that (Dylan) wasn't around to see it".

== E ==
- Prince Philip, Duke of Edinburgh was the subject of several false obituaries. First he was falsely reported dead by The Sun on May 4, 2017. The article was published on the internet after Queen Elizabeth II had called an emergency meeting to announce that the Duke was going to give up his royal engagements. Then, on August 2, 2017, an unfinished article was accidentally published on The Daily Telegraph's website reporting his death, with its headline reading "HOLD HOLD HOLD Prince Philip, Duke of Edinburgh, dies aged XX". Later, in February 2019, a notice briefly visible on the website of the Hampshire County Council claimed he was dead; the council later apologized for the error. Finally, on February 22, 2021, the Sydney Morning Herald reported the Duke's death, but the report was quickly retracted. At the time of the report, Prince Philip was in the hospital. Prince Philip died on April 9, 2021, less than two months after the last report.
- Guy Edwards was reported dead overnight on October 16, 2018, according to motorsports website Autosport. Subsequently, a former colleague of Edwards visited him in Ireland and confirmed he was still alive. Edwards died in June 2026.
- Henry Elionsky was reported dead on October 13, 1918, during the 1918 flu pandemic. Several books list his death in 1918 as fact, including Hunting the 1918 flu: one scientist's search for a killer virus and The plague of the Spanish lady: the influenza pandemic of 1918–1919. Both repeat the error from the 1918 papers. He went on to set records for distance swimming into the 1920s, and died in 1956.
- Queen Elizabeth The Queen Mother's death was erroneously announced in the Australian media in 1993 after a London-based Sky News employee saw an internal rehearsal for her future death (one of many conducted by the UK media over the years). Thinking it was for real, he phoned his mother in Australia with the 'news', who passed it on to the media. (Fragments of the Queen Mother's life history also appeared in several other world figures' premature obituaries in the CNN.com incident.) The Queen Mother died on March 30, 2002.
- Queen Elizabeth II's death was announced on BBC Radio WM on May 17, 2010. Host Danny Kelly played "God Save the Queen", then announced that "Queen Elizabeth II has now died." He was stopped by his producer, and later admitted that the announcement was meant as a joke: the Queen Elizabeth II who had died was a Facebook user who used the Queen's name. The chairman of Mediawatch-UK said in response, "Because it's the Queen and they treated it like a big announcement, it makes things worse ... It's the BBC we are talking about here, and there's a certain expectation from them." In April 2022, the Brazilian newspaper Folha de S.Paulo mistakenly published an obituary of Queen Elizabeth "at the age of XX" and that she died "as a result of XXXXXXXX". Before the Queen's actual death on September 8, 2022, the British government maintained extensive planning for her death and funeral, known as Operation London Bridge. Other Commonwealth realms kept similar protocols. Media outlets also rehearsed their coverage of her death, substituting her name with "Mrs Robinson" to avoid confusion.
- Eminem (rapper) was believed to be dead on December 10, 2023, due to an instance of Wikipedia vandalism.
- David Evans, formerly one-half of comedy double act Fayne and Evans, heard Arthur Askey say "Unfortunately, David Evans is dead" on a radio show in 1977, prompting him to participate in programmes about his life and career for Radio Bristol. Evans died in 1980.

== F ==
- Jimmy Fallon, American TV host and comedian, was believed to be dead on November 15, 2022, when a photoshopped tweet announcing that The Tonight Show host had died went viral on Twitter, causing the hashtag #RIPJimmyFallon to trend for several hours. Fallon acknowledged the death hoax on his show the following day.
- Frederick Fane, cricketer, reported in Wisden Cricketers' Almanack 1956 edition as having died on December 9, 1954. The 1961 edition reported his real death, aged 85, on November 27, 1960, saying: "Owing to a similarity of initials, Wisden reported his death when he was 79. The man concerned was Francis L. Fane, his cousin. By a coincidence, Mr Fane's father also once read his own obituary."
- Nigel Farage, British politician and then-leader of UKIP. On 29 December 2011, Farage was widely believed to have died due to an instance of Wikipedia vandalism, prompting Farage himself to clarify that he was still alive via Twitter hours later, writing: "Reports of my demise are premature, I am pleased to say. I am at my desk, working hard."
- Dorothy Fay (film actress, also called Dorothy Southworth Ritter), was declared dead in an August 2001 Daily Telegraph obituary. Mrs Ritter, who lived in a nursing home, had been taken to another room temporarily when a friend stopped by to visit. On hearing that Mrs Ritter was "gone", the friend telephoned the Telegraph obituary editor. Fay died in November 2003, 2 months after her son John.
- Freddy Fender (Tex-Mex musician) was falsely reported dead in a 2001 report from Billboard. Fender laughed off the false report at the time. Fender died in 2006.
- Will Ferrell (comedian), reported by iNewswire to have died in a paragliding accident on March 14, 2006. The press release was a hoax; Ferrell had never been paragliding.
- Terry L. Fergerson, a teacher from West Monroe, New York, US, was thought to have died in May 2006 when Terry L. Ferguson (differently spelled last name) was killed in a vehicle collision. When Fergerson arrived at work the following day, he found fellow teachers and students consoling each other over his death; various friends and relatives also thought he had died. It is not clear whether the confusion was made by them, local media or the police. In addition to their similar names, Fergerson and the real victim both drove red Chevy pickups and were of similar age. "I don't know what the percentages are, I'm not a mathematician, but it's pretty far out", Fergerson said.
- Lou Ferrigno: in May 2014, a fake news article circulated online claiming that the actor and bodybuilder had died in a car accident in California.
- Morgan Freeman, American actor, has been the subject of repeated death hoaxes. In December 2010, reports of Freeman's death spread on Twitter, after a tweet from an account associated with CNN claimed that he died in his home in Burbank. In 2012, a post went viral on Facebook which claimed that Freeman died due to a ruptured artery. In October 2017, a fake news website claimed that Freeman was found dead at his home in Mississippi.
- Sebastiao Fidelis: a Brazilian man whose supposed body was identified by his wife and buried in 2001 after he had been missing for two months. A year later, he was found wandering in the area, having lost his memory.
- Gerald Ford (former US president) in the CNN.com incident. Ford died on December 26, 2006.
- Michael J. Fox: the retired actor was reported dead in August 2018 by a website impersonating Yahoo News. The website claimed that Fox, who has been living with Parkinson's Disease since 1991, died after suffering pneumonia. He was erroneously reported dead again on April 8, 2026 by CNN; they later apologized.
- Rick Fox: the former professional basketball player was initially rumored as being among those who died in a helicopter crash that killed his teammate Kobe Bryant, Bryant's daughter Gianna, John Altobelli, and six others on January 26, 2020. Erroneous reports that Bryant's three other children (Natalia, Bianka and Capri Bryant) were also among the deceased had progressed as far as ABC News; ABC News reporter Matt Gutman was suspended for passing along the false rumor as fact.
- Nelly Frijda: the Dutch retired actress was briefly reported to have died on November 4, 2025, on Dutch news website Nu.nl. The cause was a stock obituary often prepared offline for people of advanced age (Frijda was 89 at the time), which was accidentally published. The website issued an apology the same day.

== G ==
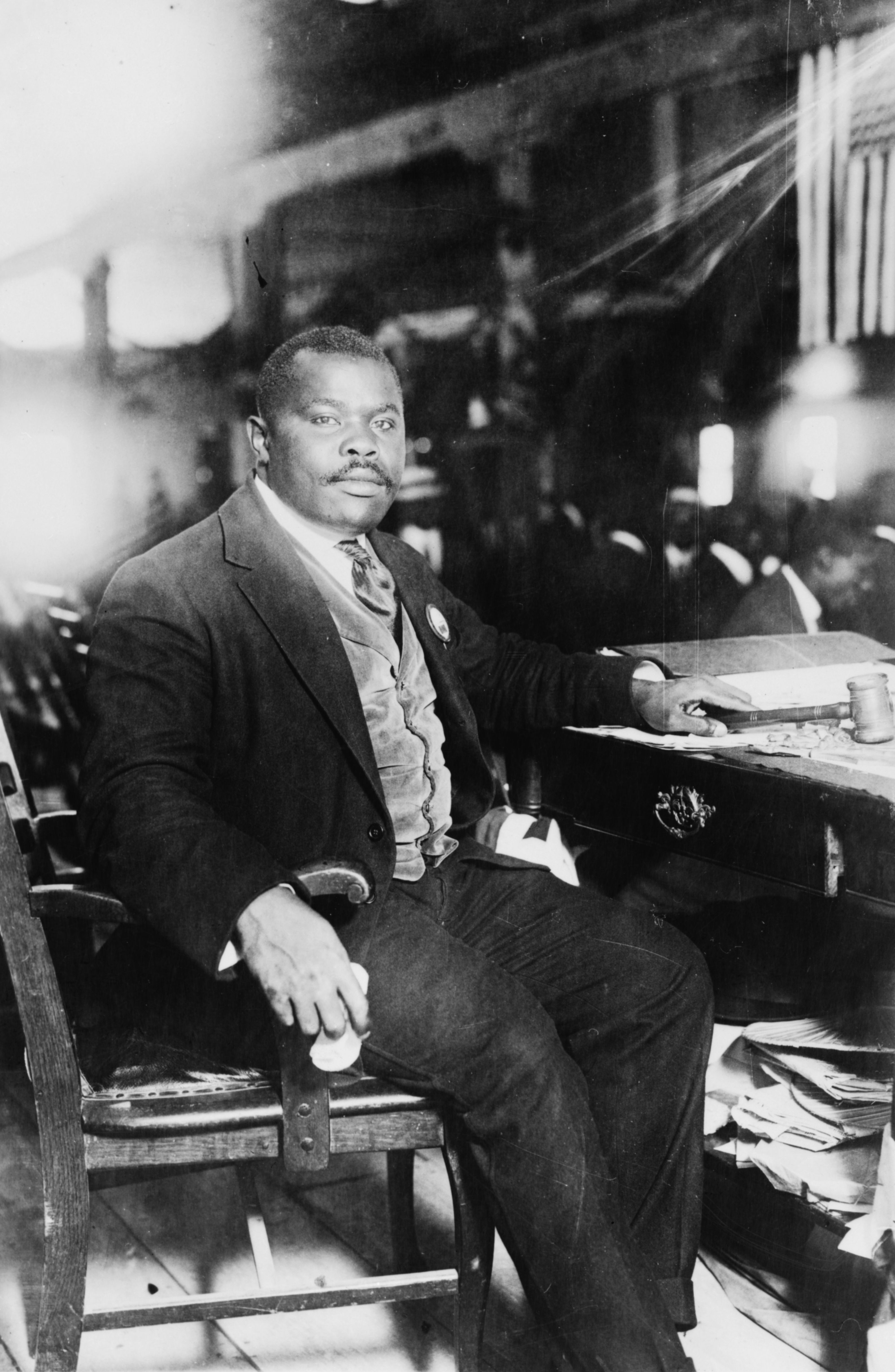
Marcus Garvey died after reading his own obituary.

- Zsa Zsa Gabor: In early 2011, many websites, including her English Wikipedia page reported the death of Zsa Zsa Gabor. However, it was quickly revealed that she had not actually died, and that this was a hoax mistaken by several websites as fact. She died on December 18, 2016.
- Saif al-Islam Gaddafi (son of former Libyan leader Muammar Gaddafi) Although it was widely reported at the time that Saif al-Islam Gaddafi had been captured or killed by NTC forces during the concluding stages of the Battle of Sirte on October 20, 2011, these reports appeared to be false due to the fact that shortly after his father and brother Mutassim were killed, the Libyan prime minister Mahmoud Jibril said that Saif al-Islam Gaddafi had managed to escape and was on the run. Gaddafi was ultimately assassinated in February 2026.
- Petko Ganchev: It was reported on 18 March 2025 that the former Bulgarian footballer was announced as dead and a minute's silence was held for him.
- S. Gandaruban: This Sri Lankan man living in Singapore faked his own death in 1987 and fled the country to escape creditors after his car rental business collapsed. He then arranged for a fake death certificate stating that he had been shot dead in crossfire. His brother and wife were convicted of their involvement. In 2007, he was charged with conspiring to claim extensive life insurance arising from the fake death.
- Gabriel García Márquez (writer), reported dead by Peruvian daily La República in 2000 shortly after being diagnosed with cancer. A number of newspapers also published his alleged farewell poem, but García Márquez denied being the author of the piece and even went as far as to say that he was upset that people could think he wrote something so tacky. It soon emerged that the poem was actually written by a Mexican man, who commented that he did not think himself to be a great writer but still was upset that his poem had been attributed to someone else. García Márquez underwent successful treatment for his cancer and lived long enough to write and publish the first volume of an autobiography. He died of pneumonia on April 17, 2014, at the age of 87.
- Marcus Garvey: After suffering a stroke in January 1940, which led to premature death reports in multiple newspapers, the black nationalist read his obituary in the Chicago Defender which described him as "broke, alone and unpopular". Apparently, as a result, Garvey suffered a second stroke and died in June 1940, two weeks after he read that report.
- Gordon Gee: In March 2003 the then-Vanderbilt University president was declared dead by a fake edition of the university's student newspaper The Vanderbilt Hustler, sparking early dismissal from classes, tears, and moments of silence. Gee issued a press release confirming he was still alive. The hoax was perpetrated by staff from a separate student satirical magazine The Slant, whose managing editor would only say: "I have the right to remain silent, and I am exercising my right of silence".
- Ghazali Shafie, then Foreign Minister of Malaysia, was reported by The New York Times to have died in an aeroplane crash in 1982. Ghazali had in fact survived the crash, read his obituaries, and lived until 2010.
- Barry Gibb: Gibb, a member of the pop group the Bee Gees, was reported dead in late May 2026 by a hoax Facebook post that received nearly 1 million likes. Gibb's family issued a statement to TMZ on May 26 that Gibb was "healthy, happy, and living life at his Miami-area home."
- Gabby Giffords: Giffords, a former member of the United States House of Representatives and a gun control advocate, has twice been the victim of a premature obituary. Giffords was one of numerous people shot during a meeting with constituents outside a grocery store in Tucson, Arizona, on January 8, 2011. Giffords sustained a serious gunshot wound to the head, but was not one of the six people immediately killed by the attack. NPR erroneously reported that she had been killed, however, and that report was picked up and circulated by numerous other media outlets, including CNN, Fox News Channel, The New York Times, and Reuters. In February 2017, U.S. Representative Sean Duffy (R-WI) erroneously claimed in a CNN New Day interview that Giffords died in the 2011 mass shooting.
- Cookie Gilchrist: Gilchrist, a former fullback in the Canadian Football League and American Football League, was presumed dead by his hospice worker on January 8, 2011, and reported the news to his nephew, Thomas Gilchrist. However, upon laying him down, Cookie was revived. Gilchrist died two days later.
- Terry Gilliam: On September 8, 2015, the website of the show business trade publication Variety briefly posted a premature obituary of director, animator, and Monty Python troupe member Terry Gilliam. Variety soon removed the post and apologized for the mistake; Gilliam followed by posting the message "I APOLOGIZE FOR BEING DEAD especially to those who have already bought tickets to the upcoming talks, but, Variety has announced my demise. Don't believe their retraction and apology!" on his Facebook page.
- Arnie "Woo Woo" Ginsburg (disc jockey and Foley artist) was erroneously proclaimed dead in the local newspaper in Ogunquit, Maine, where he resided at the time, a week before his actual death on June 26, 2020.
- Ruth Bader Ginsburg: On January 21, 2019 Fox News broadcast a "1933–2019" graphic announcing the death of the Supreme Court Justice. Ginsburg died on September 18, 2020.
- Jack Glasscock and Bill Gleason (19th century baseball players): The Reach Official American League Base Ball Guide for 1918 stated that "[o]ne of the saddest and at the same time strangest coincidences of the past year was the killing and fatally wounding on December 21 of Jack Glasscock and Billy Gleason, both famous shortstops of the 80's." According to Reach, Glasscock and Gleason died in separate car accidents on the same day in 1917, Glasscock in Lorraine, Ohio and Gleason in St. Louis, Missouri. In fact, neither former shortstop had died that day; the Jack Glasscock who was killed in an accident was not the ex-baseball player, and Bill Gleason had been seriously injured but not killed. Gleason actually died in 1932 and Glasscock in 1947, but the Reach Guide never printed a correction of its initial report of their deaths.
- Bill Gleason: See Jack Glasscock.
- Nicephorus Glycas: in 1896, having presumably been declared dead, the Greek Orthodox bishop of Lesbos Island, awoke in his coffin after he had been lying in state for two days. He sat up and asked what mourners were staring at.
- Jeff Goldblum: On June 25, 2009, the same day actress Farrah Fawcett and musician Michael Jackson died, actor Jeff Goldblum was reported dead on Australia's Channel Nine news. The report was quickly debunked, and traced back to a hoax website.
- Roberto Gómez Bolaños: The well-known actor, known by the name "Chespirito", was reported dead in 2003 by a confused Chilean reporter (Carolina Zúñiga). Actually the dead person was a Chilean writer with a similar name (Roberto Bolaño). Chespirito died in 2014.
- Roger Goodell: The commissioner of the National Football League was subject to a death hoax on June 7, 2016, when hackers broke into the league's Twitter account and announced his death. Goodell was golfing with Jim Kelly at the time of the hoax.
- Harry Gordon: in 2000, this Australian businessman faked his own death in a boating accident so his wife could claim a fortune in life insurance, though he claimed it was to evade business and relationship problems. He assumed a new identity and fled to Spain, then to England (where he worked in a potato crisp warehouse), South Africa, and New Zealand. He explained gaps in his past to a new girlfriend by telling her he was on a witness protection programme. He was discovered in 2005 and later jailed when, his brother encountered him on a mountain path in New Zealand. Gordon published a book about his exploits, titled How I Faked My Own Death.
- Frank Gorshin (American actor; the Riddler from Batman): in 1957, after driving 39 hours without a break to avoid flying to a screen test, the actor fell asleep at the wheel and crashed. A Los Angeles newspaper reported him dead. Gorshin was unconscious for four days, and the role went to another actor. Gorshin survived the crash, and resumed his career. Gorshin died in May 2005.
- Jim Gosger: The still-alive alumnus of the New York Mets baseball team was erroneously included in an In Memoriam digital billboard display during a Mets game on June 30, 2019. Gosger was hurt by the appearances, as he had not been invited to the ceremonies and had never received his ring for his role in the 1969 World Series win. The same In Memoriam segment also erroneously listed a "Jessie Hudson" among the deceased; a Jesse Hudson (no I) had played for the Mets that year but had not died.
- Gotye: In July 2012, CNN reported that the Australian indie rock singer committed suicide. The report was disproven by the singer himself, who replied on Twitter that he was in fact alive. CNN claimed the error was made by a "fraudulent user" of its iReport service.
- Robert Graves: the writer was left for dead in 1916 after receiving life-threatening injuries at the Battle of the Somme. He made a remarkable recovery, and read a report of his death in The Times. Graves lived a long life, and died in 1985, aged 90.
- Ann Green (or Anne Greene), a servant in Oxfordshire, was hanged for allegedly murdering her newborn child in 1650. Having presumably been declared dead, her corpse was taken away for dissection, but she revived. She was ultimately pardoned, and became something of a celebrity.
- Milton Green: In August 2004, the Associated Press reported that Green had died at the age of 92. The AP had mistaken another man with the same name for the former hurdler, who died a year later.
- Catherine Sophie Greenhill, a British three-year-old who was pronounced dead after falling from an upper storey window onto flagstones in the late 18th century. However, she was revived by a Dr. (or Mr.) Squires, a member of the recently formed Society for the Recovery of Persons Apparently Drowned (later the Royal Humane Society) using an early form of defibrillator. After a time in coma she eventually made a full recovery.
- Sasha Grey: In February 2015, it was reported that the actress had been captured and killed by Ukrainian military forces. Grey herself took to Twitter to dispel such rumors.
- Friedrich Gulda (pianist), who in 1999 faxed the Austrian News Agency claiming he had died of a stroke at Zurich Airport. Shortly afterwards he announced he was still alive and would be giving a 'Resurrection Recital', which was accompanied by go-go dancers (he often played pranks to annoy the musical establishment). Gulda died in 2000.
- Dominic Guzzetta: in November 2005, the former University of Akron president was reported by the Akron Beacon Journal to have been 'posthumously honored' at a fundraising event. Prior to this, he had joked for years that he reads the obituaries to make sure his name is not among them.

== H ==
- Gene Hackman: On January 27, 2015, a rumor spread on social media that actor Gene Hackman had died at the age of 84. The source stems from a career retrospective of his works that had been published on Grantland that day, whose headline referenced not his death, but his retirement from acting; and many readers who saw the article's headline assumed that he had died. Hackman died in February 2025.
- Lincoln Hall: In 2006, Lincoln Hall was climbing Mount Everest with a group of climbers, one of whom, Thomas Weber, had already died. Although Hall had reached the summit, he was suffering from what was probably cerebral edema, and on the way down was abandoned for dead by his Sherpas, after beginning to hallucinate and refusing to move. When the rest of the expedition reached ground, the leader, Alexander Abramov reported Hall had died on the way down, and Hall's family was informed. However, the day after the event, Dan Mazur found Hall sitting on a ledge, 28,200 feet up, with no oxygen. Hall had survived the night in the fabled 'death zone,' near the top of Mt Everest. Hall died of mesothelioma in 2012 at his home in Australia.
- Tom T. Hall, American country singer, was mistakenly reported dead in 2015 with the death of his wife Dixie. Hall died in 2021.
- Matt Hannon (also known as Matt Karedas), American actor best known for the title role in Samurai Cop, was erroneously reported dead in 2006 in apparent confusion with Samurai Cop director Amir Shervan (possibly exacerbated by his name change). Hannon/Karedas came forward in 2014 stating he was alive and well, the next year reprising his role in Samurai Cop 2: Deadly Vengeance.
- Corinna Harfouch: The German actress was reported dead in 2003 by a Swiss newspaper when she fell into a river during filming and was swept away. In fact, she survived and phoned her ex-husband, who had seen the obituary, from hospital to confirm that she was alive.
- Martin Harris: Several newspapers reported that he had been killed by Mormons in June 1841; the rumor supposedly came from a letter from Nauvoo. Corrections were also published. Harris died aged 92 in 1875.
- Angel Hays: In a tall tale, the French Inventor and minor celebrity claimed he was in a motorcycle accident in 1937. The doctors were unable to find a pulse and Hays was declared dead. He was buried three days later in the village of St. Quentin de Chalais. Two days after the funeral, when Hays was exhumed for the purposes of an insurance investigation, forensic examiners were surprised to find that the body was still warm. They found that Hays had been in a coma resulting from his head injury; his body's diminished need for oxygen had allowed him to survive for two days underground. Not only did he survive, but also invented a withstanding coffin that he demonstrated twice, and lived until 2008, when he was 90. There are no known back-ups to his claims.
- Jon Heder: an American actor, who was made famous by his role in Napoleon Dynamite, was rumored to have died in a car crash in 2005. Another rumor was that he died from an overdose. In an interview in March 2005 by Misty Harris of Canwest News Service, when asked about the rumors of his death, Heder said, "Yeah, and apparently it's not true."
- Hugh Hefner: On July 11, 2011, the Playboy entrepreneur was reported dead of a heart attack. Hefner died on September 27, 2017.

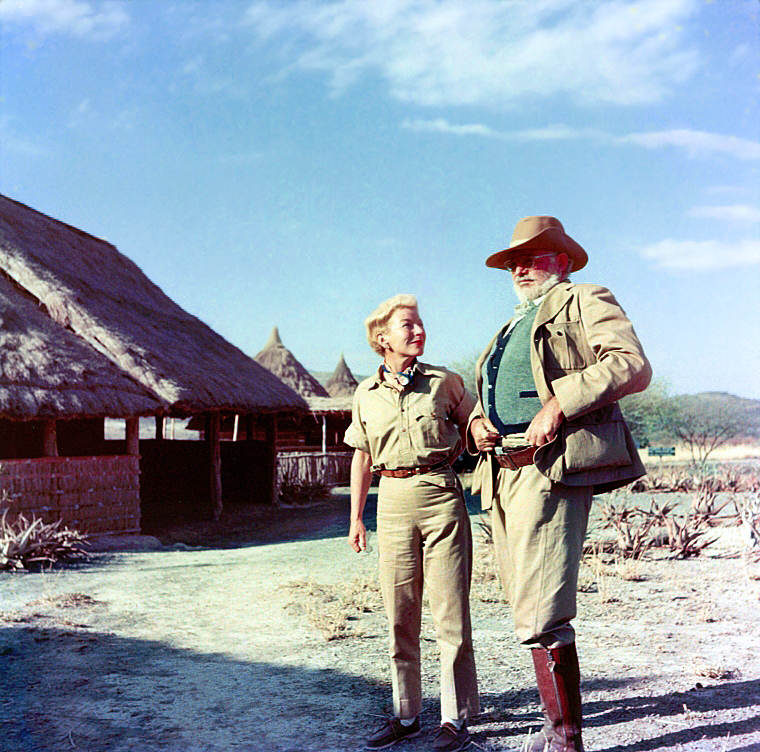
Ernest Hemingway and Mary Welsh Hemingway in Africa in 1954. Both were hurt in plane crashes during their trip and were reported dead.

- Ernest Hemingway and Mary Welsh Hemingway: After the husband and wife authors were involved in two African plane crashes in 1954, newspapers reported that both had died. They survived, but Ernest Hemingway suffered extensive injuries which affected him for the rest of his life. AE Hotchner claimed that after the incident, Hemingway read a scrapbook of his obituaries every morning with a glass of champagne. Ernest Hemingway committed suicide in 1961. Mary Welsh Hemingway died in 1986.
- Bill Henry (American baseball player): newspapers and the Associated Press reported him dead in August 2007 after the death of a similar-looking retired salesman of the same name. The dead man had claimed for decades that he was the retired sportsman—even to his wife and stepchildren—and had explained away discrepancies in his story, such as Bill Henry's date and place of birth on baseball cards, as printing errors. The fraud came to light when a genealogist investigated the incorrect date of birth published in the obituaries. The real Bill Henry died in 2014.
- Michael Heseltine: In 1994, then-DJ Chris Morris implied on BBC Radio 1 (as a prank) that the British politician had died. This led to an on-air tribute by fellow MP Jerry Hayes (during which Morris managed to make Hayes laugh inappropriately), and Morris' subsequent suspension. (See also Jimmy Savile.)
- Carl Hilderbrandt: a British businessman who jumped bail in 1990 on theft charges and faked his suicide by drowning, presumably resulting in his being declared dead. He started a new life in America, but years later was identified by a British tourist and eventually prosecuted.
- Christopher Hitchens: From the British atheism advocate's real-life obituary, after he had died in December 2011: "Hitchens had quotable ideas about posterity, clarified years ago when he saw himself referred to as 'the late' Christopher Hitchens in print."
- Cockie Hoogterp, the second wife of Baron Blixen, was declared dead in a 1936 Daily Telegraph obituary after the Baron's third wife died in an auto accident. Mrs. Hoogterp sent all her bills back marked "Deceased" and ordered the Telegraph to print that "Mrs. Hoogterp wishes it to be known that she has not yet been screwed in her coffin."
- Lena Horne: in 2008, Entertainment Weekly online posted a premature obituary for the singer-actress. Horne died on May 9, 2010.
- Bob Hope, twice. In both cases a pre-written obituary of the entertainer was accidentally published on a news website:
  1. In 1998, his obituary appeared on the Associated Press website, leading to the announcement of his death in the United States House of Representatives, broadcast live on C-SPAN.
  2. In the 2003 CNN.com incident. Hope's draft obituary, which had used the Queen Mother's as a template, described him as 'Queen Consort' and the 'UK's favorite grandmother'.

Hope died just three months later due to age-related illnesses, aged 100.

- Professor John Nicholas Peregrine Horden, a Fellow of All Souls' College Oxford. An erroneous obituary was published by the Oxford University Gazette on October 2, 2008, and withdrawn in a subsequent issue. The confusion was caused by the recent death of his father, Professor John Horden.
- Whitney Houston, American singer, was falsely reported dead of a drug overdose on a radio report on September 12, 2001. Houston died on February 11, 2012.
- Maureen Hultman, a Filipino murder victim who was prematurely announced dead on television in 1991 when she was then still in a comatose state. The gaffe led to the resignation of Tina Monzon-Palma, who read the announcement on a GMA news program.
- Humphrey, the Downing Street cat (or 'Chief Mouser to the Cabinet Office') under Margaret Thatcher, John Major, and Tony Blair, was feared dead on two occasions:
  1. In September 1995 a government press spokesman announced that Humphrey was presumed dead, as he had been missing since June. After the ensuing publicity, he was found to be alive and residing in the nearby Royal Army Medical College where he had been taken in as a stray. A statement was issued quoting Humphrey as saying: "I have had a wonderful holiday at the Royal Army Medical College, but it is nice to be back and I am looking forward to the new parliamentary session."
  2. In November 1997, there were media allegations that Cherie Blair disliked the cat so much that she had had him killed; the government claimed he had merely gone into retirement away from the public spotlight. In Parliament, Alan Clark MP demanded that the government prove Humphrey was still alive. As a result, the government released photographs of Humphrey posing with the day's newspapers as proof.

Humphrey's actual death was announced by Tony Blair in March 2006.

- William Hung: In 2004, a satirical news report on the Broken Newz website claiming that the American Idol contestant had died of a heroin overdose was widely believed, forcing Hung to issue a denial.
- Saddam Hussein, former President of Iraq, was reported dead in April 1980 by Radio Tehran. This incident took place during a diplomatic standoff between Iraq and Iran, culminating in the Iran–Iraq War. Saddam was executed on December 30, 2006 after being convicted of crimes against humanity.

== I ==
- Gabriel Iglesias: On November 1, 2014, a fake news article spread on Facebook claimed that the comedian had died. The next day, Iglesias posted a message assuring his fans that he was still alive.
- David Irving, author and convicted Holocaust denier: In October 2023, Irving fell sick in Florida and was sent back to his home country of England. Irving has required constant medical care ever since, but this was only announced in February 2024 with a blog post on his publisher's website. This announcement ended with a note that Irving is no longer able to continue writing. This announcement was misinterpreted as declaring that Irving had died at the age of 85 and various neo-Nazi websites, as well as Searchlight magazine and the Toronto Sun, published the supposed news of Irving's death. After this happened, Irving's wife Paloma added to the comment section that Irving was actually still alive but is in a critical condition and still requires constant medical care. Paloma then made a second blog post stating the same.
- Samuel Israel III: This former manager of the hedge fund Bayou Hedge Fund Group faked suicide. On June 9, 2008, his sports vehicle was found abandoned, with the words "suicide is painless" on the hood. He eventually turned himself in at the urging of his mother to serve the 20 years of prison he was sentenced to.

== J ==
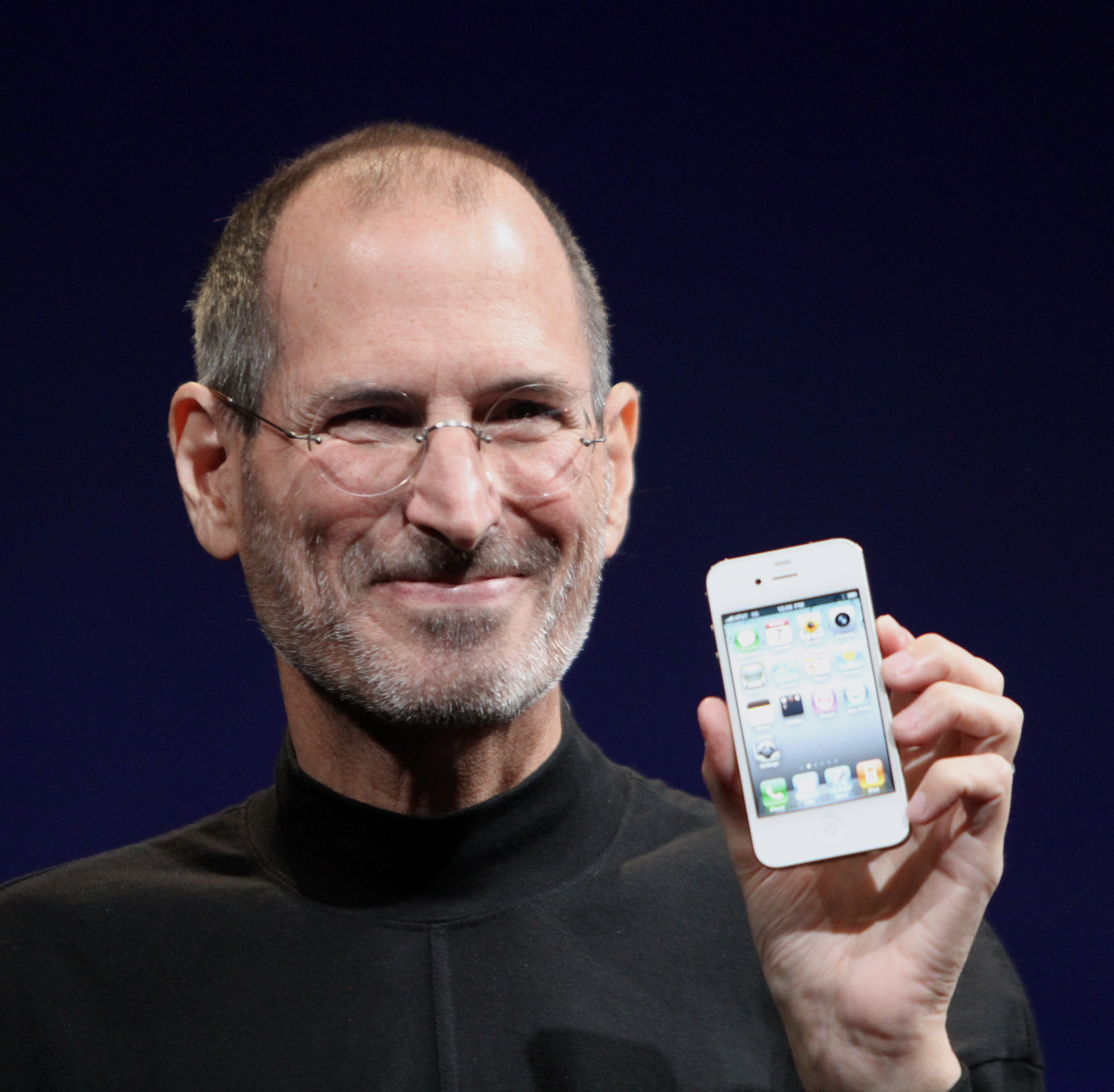
Bloomberg published an obituary for Steve Jobs over three years before his death

- Joe Jackson: Following the news that the patriarch of the Jackson family was suffering from terminal pancreatic cancer, a fake news website reported that Jackson died on June 23, 2018, citing fictional claims from TMZ and Variety. Jackson succumbed to the cancer four days later, on June 27.
- Michael Jackson, American musician, was twice reported dead after pranks by disc jockeys. The first occurred in Stockton, California in February 2007, with the DJ claiming that Jackson died after "eating some twelve year old spoiled nuts." The second occurred in Albuquerque, New Mexico, on December 24, 2008, this time claiming that Jackson died of a drug overdose. Six months after the second hoax, Jackson would actually die of a drug overdose on June 25, 2009.
- Sharolyn Jackson: This Philadelphia woman was erroneously declared dead in July 2013 after a body had been found two days after her disappearance that had been misidentified as hers. Thirteen days after her funeral, Jackson showed up alive at a mental health facility.
- Chris Jericho: Wikipedia noted of Jericho's supposed death in April 2014. This was proven to be vandalism, and Jericho would jokingly tweet that he had died. Two months later, Wikipedia again listed Jericho as having died in June 2014. Jericho would tweet that he has unfortunately 'died again', referencing the first hoax.
- Jiang Zemin: Amid internet rumors concerning his health, Hong Kong's Asia Television reported him dead on its 6 pm evening news broadcast on July 6, 2011. The next day, China's Xinhua News Agency dismissed reports of Jiang's death as "pure rumor", prompting ATV to retract its earlier report. Jiang died on November 30, 2022.
- Steve Jobs: On August 27, 2008, Bloomberg accidentally published a 17-page obituary. During a subsequent keynote address, Jobs joked about the accident by displaying on screen an imprecise quotation of Mark Twain (who was also the recipient of a premature obituary) reading "The reports of my death are greatly exaggerated". Jobs actually died of pancreatic cancer on October 5, 2011, at the age of 56.
- Pope John Paul II:
  1. Immediately after the 1981 attempt on his life, despite heightened caution from CBS's premature obituary of James Brady weeks earlier, CNN implied the Pope had died by repeatedly referring to him in the past tense.
  2. In 2003, by CNN again, this time in the CNN.com incident. The draft obituary, which had used the Queen Mother's as a template, noted the Pope's 'love of racing'.
  3. On April 1, 2005, the day before his actual death, Fox News reported he had died after it received incorrect reports from Italian media that his electrocardiography had gone flat.
- Dwayne Johnson: The American actor was falsely reported dead on April 12, 2014, but Johnson posted a photo on Instagram of him working out at the gym, which disproved the story. The report was the same as Robyn Malcolm's death hoax—falling 60 feet down Kauri Cliffs in New Zealand. The initial report stated that Johnson was filming Fast and Furious 7 at the time, which has no scheduled filming in New Zealand. If the news was true, it would have been the second death during production, after Paul Walker's death in November 2013.
- Jay Jon: in September 2014, the 17-year-old Brooklyn-based rapper was the subject of a death hoax. A Facebook post claimed that he was found dead on a sidewalk shortly after releasing a music video, C.O.P., on YouTube. The rumor still persisted for two months, until Jay Jon addressed the hoax.
- Jonathan: The Seychelles giant tortoise, believed to be the world's oldest living land animal, was falsely declared dead on April 1, 2026 by a social media account claiming to belong to his vet. The death hoax was reported by various outlets, including the BBC, Daily Mail and USA Today. Jonathan's real vet, Joe Hollins, confirmed to the media that Jonathan is still alive.
- James Earl Jones: in 1998 the actor was mistakenly pronounced dead during a radio broadcast of a Pittsburgh Pirates baseball game by play-by-play announcer Lanny Frattare. Frattare had confused him with James Earl Ray, who committed the assassination of Martin Luther King Jr. Jones was also the subject of an internet death hoax in August 2015, when a parody website posted news of his "death" which quickly spread via social media. Jones died on September 9, 2024.
- Michael Jordan: in February 2015, a death hoax surfaced with the claim that the former NBA superstar had died of a heart attack in his sleep at the age of 52.
- Juan Carlos I: in August 2019, El País erroneously published a draft obituary stating that the former Spanish king, who abdicated in 2014, died following complications from a cardiovascular surgery.
- Raid Juhi: in March 2005 the presiding judge in the trial of Saddam Hussein was incorrectly reported by NBC News to have been assassinated. The real victims were another trial judge, Barbweez Mahmood, and his son. NBC blamed incorrect information from US officials.

== K ==
- Kabosu: the Japanese Shiba Inu dog, known as the face of the internet meme Doge, was declared dead in an April Fools' Day prank by China Central Television in 2017. Kabosu died on May 24, 2024 from natural causes.
- Kailash (full name unknown): this farm labourer from Uttar Pradesh, India, was officially registered as dead by cousins in order to steal land he had inherited. He went to court, but the case was mired in legal delays, and his cousins beat him and threatened to kill him. "It is better to be dead on paper than to be really dead," he said. (See also Lal Bihari.)
- Kitty Kallen: The American singer was reported dead in 1978, after a woman who had identified herself both as Genevieve Agostinello and Kitty Kallen died in a hospital in Duarte, California. The hospital's public relations director stated, "She said her professional name was Kitty Kallen .... We had no reason not to believe her." Kallen died January 7, 2016.
- Hiannick Kamba: The former footballer, once a prospect for Bundesliga club Schalke 04, was reported dead in a 2016 auto accident in his home country of DR Congo. In May 2020, the German newspaper Bild reported that Kamba, by then age 33, was alive and working for an energy company in Germany. In 2018, Kamba told German prosecutors that friends had taken his money, identification, and documentation in the wake of the accident, making it difficult to prove that he was alive. In the meantime, his now-former wife used reports of his death to receive a large insurance payout, apparently unknown to him. Upon the discovery of Kamba's survival, an insurance fraud investigation into the ex-wife was opened.
- Denis Kapustin: the pro-Ukraine Russian militant and leader of the Russian Volunteer Corps was reported on 27 December 2025 to have been killed in a drone strike while fighting for Ukraine in Zaporizhzhia Oblast. On 1 January 2026, the Main Directorate of Intelligence (Ukraine) (HUR) revealed that he was still alive, and that his death had been staged as part of a special operation. They said Russian special services had ordered his death, but Ukraine had faked his death and claimed the 500,000 USD reward for killing him.
- Edward McKnight Kauffer: Poster designer and illustrator was reported by the Times of London on 29 September 1954 as dead. The report with his obituary was accidentally published 23 days before his death.
- George Kaye: in November 2005, the Irish musician was reported dead by the Daily Mirror following a plane crash.
- Ken Kesey: in 1966, the author of One Flew Over the Cuckoo's Nest faked his own suicide in an attempt to escape drug charges. He had friends leave his truck and a suicide note on a cliffside road in California, while he fled to Mexico. He later returned to the US, but was arrested and jailed for five months. Kesey died in 2001.
- Khushwant Singh: an English writer from India wrote his own obituary in his mid-twenties while he worked in Undivided India at Lahore. The title he chose for his obituary: Posthumous. Singh actually lived a long life, and died of natural causes at the age of 99 on March 20, 2014.
- Rudyard Kipling: His death had been incorrectly announced in a magazine, to which he wrote: "I've just read that I am dead. Don't forget to delete me from your list of subscribers." Kipling died in 1936.
- Michael "Corporal" Kirchner, former professional wrestler, was reported dead in an article at WWE.com on October 15, 2006. He and his family were understandably confused and upset, and even after Kirchner confirmed that he was alive, the error was never officially retracted on WWE's website. Kirchner died December 22, 2021.
- Larry King, American TV host, was mistakenly believed to have died on December 20, 2012, when news of the death of playwright Larry L. King was announced, prompting confusion. King died on January 23, 2021.
- Wayne Knight, an American actor, was reported dead in a motor vehicle accident on March 16, 2014. After being made aware of the report, Knight quickly tweeted that he was alive and well.
- Janina Kolkiewicz: In November 2014, this 91-year-old Polish woman's family found her to be without a pulse. A doctor was summoned, and she was declared dead after examination. A death certificate was issued, and her body was brought to a morgue. However, mortuary workers called several hours later to report that she was alive. She was eventually allowed to return home.
- Larry Kramer: in December 2001, the gay rights activist was reported dead by Associated Press following a liver transplant. Kramer died on May 27, 2020.

== L ==
- Fernando Nuno La Fuente, an amateur footballer, was reported by his Irish club Ballybrack to have died in a car crash in order to postpone a match in 2018. Players in other games wore black armbands, and held a minute's silence. In fact, the footballer had merely flown home to Spain. His mother took him to the dentist and hospital for a full check-up, just to make sure. The club was sanctioned for bringing the game into disrepute.

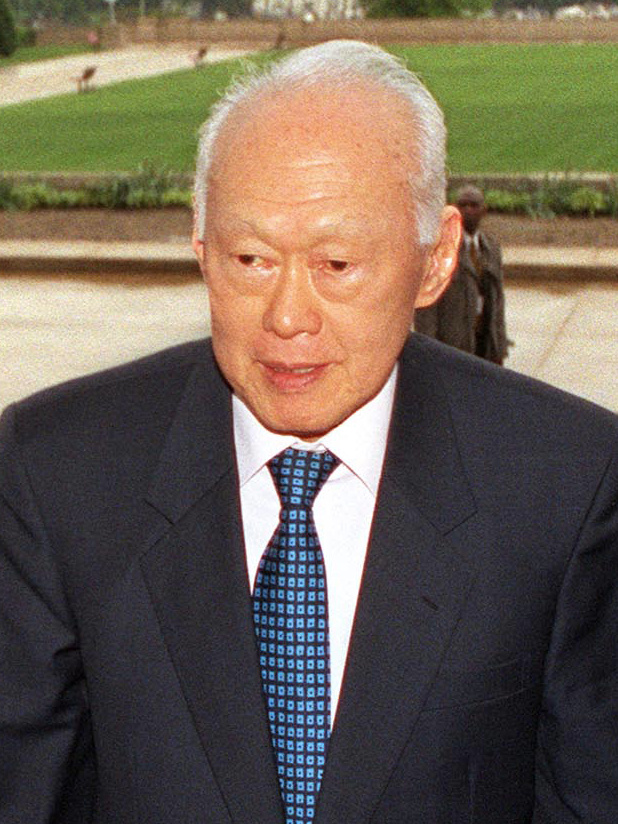
A death hoax website reported false news of Lee Kuan Yew's death.

- Xavier LaBelle was wrongly reported as one of the fatalities in the Humboldt Broncos bus crash. While he was unconscious, he was wrongly identified as Parker Tobin, and Tobin's body was identified as his, a situation similar to that of Whitney Cerak.
- Bobby Labonte, a NASCAR driver, was reported dead in 2001 and in 2002 in traffic accidents. This was a mix-up after Bobby's father-in-law had died.
- W. S. Lach-Szyrma, a curate and pioneering writer of science fiction, became ill during a visit to Paris in 1871 and on his return to Cornwall found that his obituary had been published in several papers. He is credited as the first writer to use the word Martian as a noun. Lach-Szyrma died in 1915.
- Artie Lange, comedian from The Howard Stern Show, was reported dead in May 2004 by KLAS-TV in Las Vegas. The show was being broadcast from Las Vegas, and Stern show prank caller Captain Janks capitalized on Artie's debauched reputation by telling the news station that he was a representative from the Hard Rock Hotel, and that Artie had been found dead in his hotel room.
- Betsy Langjahr: In January 2016, Pennsylvania police reported that an unidentified dead body found in 1973 may have been that of Betsy Langjahr, who was a missing teenage runaway at the time. However, police soon received a number of tips alerting them to the fact that Langjahr was still alive.
- Lukáš Latinák, a Slovak actor, was reported to have died in September 2024, following a failed stunt. The report was a hoax procured by financial scam accounts on Slovak web and social media.
- Martin Lawrence: in March 2015, a fake news website reported that the comedian had been found dead in a hotel room.
- Guillaume Le Gentil left Paris to head towards Pondicherry in 1760. He faced numerous delays and troubles and was unable to return until 1771, when he found that he had been declared legally dead. Le Gentil died in 1792.
- Lee Kuan Yew, first Prime Minister of Singapore. On March 18, 2015, a death hoax website reported false news of Lee's death. It was done by a minor student, who made the news and then shared it to his friends, and later circulated through many websites. Lee, who was then in a critical condition due to pneumonia, died five days later.
- Spike Lee – following the death of Stan Lee in 2018, the Gisborne Herald newspaper accompanied a front-page picture of Stan Lee with the caption "Spike Lee dead at 95". Spike Lee and others responded to this blunder via Twitter.
- Titan Leeds, publisher of an almanac competing with Benjamin Franklin's Poor Richard's Almanack. Franklin had repeatedly predicted that Leeds would die in 1733 in his almanac, and when the date of Leeds' supposed death had come and gone, published Leeds' obituary anyway. When Leeds actually died in 1738 Benjamin Franklin publicly commended the impostors for ending their charade. (See the somewhat similar case of John Partridge.)
- Tom Lehrer, American mathematician and musical satirist, kept a running collection of premature declarations of him being "the late Tom Lehrer" in newspaper clippings, a confusion aided by Lehrer's longevity (he died at age 97 in 2025) and the fact that he retreated from the public spotlight and ceased writing new material around 1972 and led a relatively private life for the next five decades.
- Kimo Leopoldo, mixed martial arts fighter, was the subject of numerous premature obituaries on July 21, 2009. Internet reports that Leopoldo had died after complications from a heart attack late in the evening on July 20 were picked up and republished by a large number of mainstream media outlets, including The Huffington Post, TMZ, the New York Daily News, The Orange County Register, and USA Today.
- Jerry Lee Lewis, the rock-and-roll and country musician, was confused with the similarly named comedian, actor, filmmaker and humanitarian Jerry Lewis, who died on August 20, 2017. An early CNN.com obituary of the comedian mistakenly used the musician's name in the headline, and Google searches for "Jerry Lee Lewis death" incorrectly indicated that he had died. On October 26, 2022, following reports that Lewis was ill with influenza, TMZ incorrectly reported that he had died, after receiving a tip from someone posing as a spokesperson. Lewis died two days later at the age of 87.
- Karen Lewis, then-president of the Chicago Teachers Union, had her pre-written obituary by Neil Steinberg accidentally published on the website of the Chicago Sun-Times in January 2018. Commenting on the incident, she said "I thought it was hilarious – stuff happens." Lewis died on February 7, 2021.
- Gordon Lightfoot, Canadian folk musician, was mistakenly reported dead by CBC Radio 3, Canwest and the Calgary Herald on February 18, 2010. The source of the rumour was a prank phone call to Ronnie Hawkins, a long time friend of Lightfoot's, by a man claiming to be the singer's grandson. Media outlets ran the story having confirmed with Hawkins. Lightfoot was in fact at the dentist at the time the story broke. Lightfoot actually died on May 1, 2023.
- Lil Tay, 15-year-old Canadian internet personality, was reported dead on a post on her Instagram in August 2023. She then said that her account had been hacked.
- Arthur Livingston, a then-36-year-old resident of Prosperity, South Carolina, was erroneously reported dead by his bank, Bank of America, when he sold his house in May 2009. As of February 2012, neither the bank nor the three credit agencies who recognized the false death report have corrected the error, which has caused difficulties for Livingston in his attempts to gain credit.
- Bill Lockwood, a former English Test cricketer, had an obituary erroneously published by The Register, a South Australian newspaper, in November 1927, over four years before his actual death in April 1932.
- Bessie Love, the American actress, relocated to England in the 1930s, and was erroneously reported as dead multiple times by the American press. In the 1940s, an American impostor was found murdered in a New York apartment. In the 1960s, the Los Angeles Times had published that Love was, correctly, a graduate of Los Angeles High School, but, incorrectly, one who had died. She actually lived a long life, and died in 1986.

== M ==
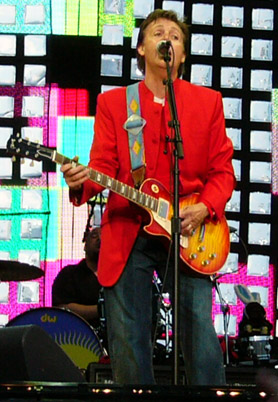
Paul McCartney was reported dead on American radio in 1969.

- Claude Maxwell MacDonald, was the British minister in Beijing during the Boxer Rising in 1900, and had his obituary published in "The Times" along with those of other prominent foreigners in the city. MacDonald died in 1915.
- Ralph Macchio, famous for The Karate Kid, was the subject of a death hoax. In January 2013, a hoax article claimed that he had died in a snowboarding accident in Switzerland. The same hoax was also recirculated in March 2014.
- Lonnie Mack, the rock guitarist best known as the founder of the blues-rock guitar genre, was lamented as recently deceased in the foreword to the 1997 book Rock Music in American Popular Culture. Although rarely seen in recent years, the notoriously reclusive Mack was still very much alive, and performed as a headliner at the Rock & Roll Hall of Fame as recently as November 15, 2008. Mack died in 2016.
- Ian MacKaye, frontman of bands Fugazi and Minor Threat was incorrectly reported dead after a hoax stating that he had been struck by a car gained traction.
- Iven Mackay, an Australian general, received an obituary in The Times, entitled "Athlete, Soldier and Headmaster", as a result of a case of mistaken identity following the death of Major General James Alexander Kenneth Mackay in 1935. Mackay died in 1966.
- John Madden the Hall of Fame coach was reported dead on April 29, 2014, by Empire News, convincing many sports fans before being disproved. Madden died December 28, 2021.
- Nelson Mandela (South African leader) was reported as having died in an article on the Deutsche Welle website on June 14, 2013. The site later blamed this on an unspecified "technical difficulty". He was also one of those whose obituaries were released in the CNN.com incident. Mandela died on December 5, 2013.
- Charles Manson: On May 15, 2015, a fake news website reported that the notorious criminal had been found dead in his prison cell. A similar hoax story that surfaced on September 14 of that year also proclaimed the same thing. Manson died of natural causes on November 19, 2017.
- Vanni Marcoux, French baritone, was incorrectly reported as having died in World War I in 1914. He actually died in 1962.
- Jerry Maren, American actor best known as one of the Munchkins in the 1939 film version of The Wizard of Oz. Several news outlets, including the Examiner, cited social media reports that Maren, the last surviving Munchkin from the film, had died on February 29, 2016, but Maren appeared on social media (in what would be his last appearance) to disprove the reports. Maren died on May 24, 2018, from a combination of old age-related diseases.
- Bam Margera: In May 2018, rumors briefly circulated that the skateboarding and reality TV icon was dead after wrestler Hulk Hogan posted a tribute to Twitter. The tweet resurfaced in December 2021, once again sparking the false rumor that Margera had died.
- Margrethe II, former queen of Denmark, was reported to have died in an article published by regional broadcaster TV 2 Fyn on November 13, 2026. The article was removed three days later and the editor-in-chief apologized for the error.
- Eleanor Markham: an American woman, one of the most prominent cases of an averted premature burial in the late 19th century. She was pronounced dead on July 8, 1894, in Sprakers, New York, however woke up in her coffin 2 days later en route to the graveyard on July 10, 1894.
- Johnny Sterling Martin: to avoid paying child support, in 1979 this American persuaded a relative to call a family court and claim that Martin had died in a bar fight. In January 2006, following a tip-off by an ex-wife, he was located 150 miles (240 km) away where he had been living under his real name. He was arrested and jailed. During the intervening decades his child support bill had risen to $30,000.
- Karl Marx: On September 6, 1871, The New York Times reported the German philosopher to be dead. Marx actually died in 1883.
- Alison Matera: in 2006 this Florida woman told fellow church choir members that she had cancer, and over the course of 11 months gave them reports of her treatment, culminating in the claim that she was near death and would be going into a hospice. She subsequently made further phone calls masquerading as a hospice nurse, then as Matera's sister, claiming that Matera had died. The church arranged a memorial service—to which Matera showed up, again claiming to be her sister. Suspicions had already been aroused from the phone calls, in which the nurse and sister both sounded exactly like Matera. Police did not arrest her as no crime had been committed; she blamed her behaviour on childhood trauma. Matera really did die a few years later on June 15, 2011.
- Mary Mather, a paediatrician who was reported dead in December 2004 by the General Medical Council after confusion with another person of the same name.
- Jerry Mathers: rumours that the Leave it to Beaver actor had been killed in Vietnam spread to newspapers by December 1969. (Claims that Associated Press and United Press International put out the story, and that it arose from confusion with the death of another soldier called Mathers, appear to be false.)
- Brian Matthew: On April 5, 2017, the BBC reported that the radio presenter had died the previous night. They later updated to say that he was critically ill, but alive. He died three days later, on April 8.
- Dave Matthews: in 2003, a fake news website reported that the musician had died of a drug overdose.
- C. W. McCall was erroneously reported dead by WDEV radio show Music to Go to the Dump By on the February 25, 2022, after the hosts had misinterpreted news reports regarding McCall's announcement that he was dying of cancer and in hospice care, but not yet dead. He died on April 1, 2022.
- Paul McCartney was proclaimed dead in 1969 by a caller to radio DJ Russ Gibb's show on WKNR-FM Detroit. A few days later, New York DJ Roby Yonge was fired for discussing McCartney's possible death on a late-night show. These and other incidents led to interminable rumours that McCartney's supposed death (hinted at by a trail of supposed clues in various Beatles songs) had been covered up and he had been replaced by a look-alike.
- Mark McGrath, actor and lead singer of Sugar Ray, was the subject of a deliberate death hoax; to promote the TV series Hot Package, production company Prismatics issued a press release claiming McGrath had been shot to death during production of the show. (It was in fact his character that was killed off.)
- Vince McMahon, former CEO and founder of WWE, was killed off WWE television when he "died" in a limousine explosion on the June 11, 2007 episode of WWE Raw. Despite many fans discerning the "death" to be part of a storyline, some fans, as well as McMahon's close friend Donald Trump believed the explosion to be real, and that McMahon was really dead. The storyline abruptly ended when WWE learned of the real deaths of wrestler Chris Benoit and his family, and McMahon returned to television on June 25.
- Sipho William Mdletshe, a South African man who was thought to have died in a 1993 traffic accident. After spending two days in a metal box in a mortuary, he was freed when his cries alerted workers. However, his fiancée refused to see him thereafter, believing he had turned into a zombie.
- John Mellencamp: In December 2012, it was reported on the internet that the singer had died. The report was picked up by some media outlets before Mellencamp's representatives officially declared it to be a hoax.
- Thomas Menino: as an April Fool's Day prank in 1998, shock jocks Opie and Anthony claimed on WAAF-FM radio that the Boston mayor had died in a car accident. Several local media outlets picked up on the story and reported it as true, causing a media firestorm that eventually led to the pair being fired. However, fan support resulted in Opie & Anthony getting a job in New York. Menino later died in October 2014.
- Bertrand Meyer was proclaimed dead by the Heise News Ticker in 2005. See Bertrand Meyer English Wikipedia Hoax.
- Bret Michaels: In December 2014, a hoax article claimed that the singer had died in a jet ski accident.
- Cesar Millan: On December 2, 2014, a fake news website reported that the famous "Dog Whisperer" had died of a heart attack.
- Donald E. Miller Jr.: After mysteriously disappearing and failing to pay child support, this Ohio man was legally declared dead in 1994. However, it turned out that Miller had simply left the state, and in 2013 he asked a judge to reverse the declaration of death so he could apply for a driver's license. The judge was unable to honor this request, as Ohio law states that a declaration of death cannot be reversed after more than three years have passed. As such, Miller remained legally dead as of October 2013. Further complicating the matter is the fact that Miller's ex-wife received Social Security benefit payments for their children for several years, and she might be required to return them if the declaration of death is reversed.
- Prasad and Mahaprasad Mishra (Indian brothers) were officially declared dead in 1979 by four nephews in order to steal their land in Uttar Pradesh. Although the nephews were forced to admit fraud, the case was mired in legal delays for many years. The Mishra brothers' "deaths" were finally annulled in 1999 (by which point Prasad had reached the age of 75) after intervention by the Association of the Dead, an organisation that protests such cases. (See also Lal Bihari.)
- Joni Mitchell: On October 7, 2022, People accidentally published their advance obituary for the singer-songwriter online, with the placeholder headline "Joni Mitchell Dies at TK AGE". The article was soon removed from the website, and a spokesperson for Mitchell's record label confirmed she was alive.
- Salwan Momika, noted for his refugee status and for his criticism of Islam which lead him to publicly burn the Islamic holy book the Quran in 2023. At the time of the burning, Momika resided in Sweden. Momika is an atheist of Assyrian Christian descent and a refugee from Iraq. On April 2, 2024, Momika was falsely reported to have found dead by social media. Later that day, the death was disproved and he was revealed to be still alive. On January 29, 2025, Momika was shot and killed while he was filming a livestream in his home in Södertälje, Sweden.
- George Monbiot (environmentalist and writer) was once declared clinically dead in Lodwar General Hospital in north-western Kenya after contracting cerebral malaria. He recovered.
- Joe Montana: In August 2013, a hoax news article claimed that the former 49ers quarterback had been killed in a car crash.
- Bella Montoya: A 76-year old Ecuadorian woman who was declared dead by a doctor on 9 June 2023 following a suspected stroke, only to be found gasping for air after her coffin was opened at a funeral parlor five hours later. She was rushed back to the hospital where she was declared dead, and eventually died on 16 June from an ischemic stroke.
- Ron Moody (actor best known as Fagin in the film Oliver!) was reported dead twice (according to The Times, June 12, 2015): Hello! magazine reported in 1993 that he had died of a stroke, and in 2010 "a piece in a London paper about famous residents of Southgate reported that the actor had died four years earlier". Moody was quoted as saying: "I'm bloody annoyed. Not only can it cause unhappiness, but it can affect your work. If people think you're dead they're not going to use you. Unless it's a kinky film." Moody died on June 11, 2015.
- Peter Moran (British journalist) was reported dead in the December 2007 issue of aviation magazine FlyPast; he had previously contributed to the magazine for several years. This was apparently due to confusion with another aviation writer of the same name, and was corrected in the January 2008 issue.
- Chad Morgan, the comic Australian country music performer, phoned his sister to say, "This is the ghost of Chad Morgan," after his death was announced in 2008 on 4GY, a regional radio station. Morgan died on 1 January 2025.
- Herta Müller: On July 6, 2020, a now-deleted Twitter account reported on the supposed news of the death of the Romanian-born, German-speaking Nobel Literature Prize winner. This was debunked the same day by Müller's publisher.
- Pranab Mukherjee: On August 13, 2020, after it was reported that the former Indian President was terminally ill after a fall at his bathroom, which caused a massive head injury, and being tested positive for COVID-19, news reports claimed that he died. His son dispelled rumors. Mukherjee, who was in a critical condition due to both illnesses, died on August 31, 18 days after the report.
- Harry Mulisch: On August 6, 2009, the Dutch writer was falsely declared dead by a Dutch Teletext service, after which some news websites took over the news. He died in 2010.
- Alice Munro: The Canadian author was reported to have died in November 2019. However, her publisher confirmed that she was alive. Munro died on May 13, 2024.
- Declan Murphy: The jockey fell during a race at Haydock Park Racecourse in 1994, and was trampled by a horse behind him. He slipped into a coma, and was revived hours before a decision on whether to switch off his life-support system was due to be made. Murphy resolved to return to racing after reading his obituary in the Racing Post.
- Paul Mutora: In January 2014, this Kenyan man was declared dead after having swallowed insecticide to kill himself. However, morgue workers noticed movement in his body and discovered that he was in fact still alive.
- Levy Mwanawasa: On July 3, 2008, the Johannesburg-based 702 Talk Radio claimed that the President of Zambia had died in a Paris hospital while recovering from a stroke suffered 4 days before in Egypt. The government stated that the story was false. Mwanawasa died 47 days later from complications of the stroke.

== N ==
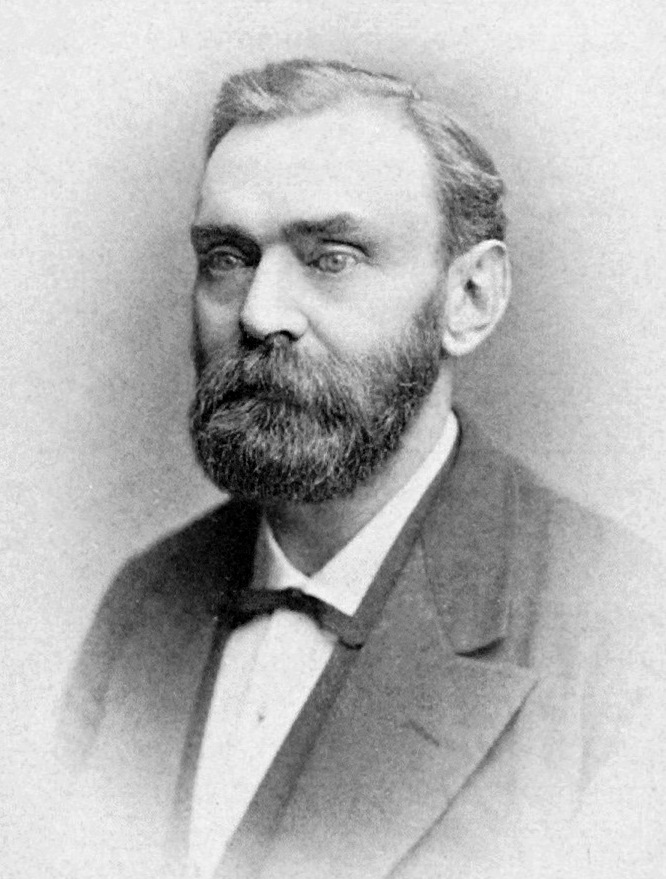
Alfred Nobel bequeathed his fortune to institute the Nobel Prizes after reading a damning premature obituary

- Jayaprakash Narayan: while hospitalized in March 1979, the politician's death was erroneously announced by India's prime minister, causing a brief wave of national mourning, including the suspension of parliament and regular radio broadcasting, and closure of schools and shops. The mistake arose when the director of the Intelligence Bureau saw a body looking like Narayan being carried from the hospital where he was undergoing treatment. Narayan survived the incident, but died seven months later, in October 1979.
- K. R. Narayanan: While hospitalized due to pneumonia and other age-related complaints on November 9, 2005, the veteran Indian diplomat and politician, who was the former Vice President (1992-1997) and President of India (1997-2002) was declared dead by the media. Later, due to the protests of many, it was dismissed. Narayanan, who was gravely ill, died later on the same day.
- Billy Bass Nelson: Nelson's death was announced by his former Parliament-Funkadelic bandmate George Clinton on January 26, 2026, which was then reported on by some music news websites. A few days later, the Black Rock Coalition reported that Nelson was still alive and in hospice care. The post about Nelson's death was removed from Clinton's Facebook page. Nelson died six days later on January 31.
- Judd Nelson: On October 26, 2014, it was reported that the actor and Brat Pack member was found dead in his Los Angeles home. Nelson later took to Twitter with a recently printed newspaper to dispel such rumors.
- Willie Nelson: On February 21, 2015, a fake news website reported that the legendary country singer had been found dead at his home. A similar hoax story surfaced in August of that year that proclaimed the same thing.
- Alfred Nobel (chemist and founder of the Nobel Prize): in 1888, the death of his brother Ludvig caused several newspapers to publish obituaries of Alfred in error. A French obituary stated Le marchand de la mort est mort ("The merchant of death is dead") and that Nobel "became rich by finding ways to kill more people faster than ever before" through his invention of military explosives. This distressed Nobel, who was concerned that when he actually died he would not be remembered well. This event led him to bequeath the bulk of his estate to form the Nobel Prize in 1895. Nobel died in 1896.
- Joseph Norton: the death of the 89-year-old University at Albany professor emeritus was incorrectly reported in the Summer 2007 edition of the university's alumni magazine. When asked whether he knew anyone who wanted him dead, Norton replied, "I haven't any idea. There might well be. I've been rather active in the gay world, which not everybody approves of." Norton died in 2011.
- Ted Nugent (musician and activist) was falsely declared dead by fake news site The Last Line of Defense in May 2017.

== O ==
- Grady O'Cummings: this civil rights activist and political candidate had his own obituary published in The New York Times and New York Amsterdam News in 1969. Four months later he held a news conference at which he stated that he had faked his own death due to threats against him and his family by members of the Black Panther Party. O'Cummings died on June 2, 1996.
- Maureen O'Hara: the film actress was listed as dead on the Internet Movie Database in 1998, apparently due to confusion with actress Maureen O'Sullivan. O'Hara died on October 24, 2015.
- Mark O'Shea: the television snake expert was reported killed by a 14-year-old king cobra which struck his foot at West Midland Safari Park, UK on August 19, 2012. The cobra, was being fed thawed rats when it stuck O'Shea's shoe, venom soaking into his sock and entered his system via abrasions on his foot, rather than through fang punctures. The symptoms were relatively mild but he was hospitalised as a precaution due to the high yield and toxicity of king cobra venom. He was discharged the following day.
- Barack Obama: on July 4, 2011, a hacker collective called "The Script Kiddies" took control of Fox News's politics Twitter feed and posted that the incumbent president had been assassinated during a campaigning event in Iowa.
- Andrew Olle: This Australian journalist had been taken off life support on 11 December 1995 after having collapsed four days earlier due to a brain hemorrhage associated with a previously undiagnosed brain tumor. That afternoon the radio station he worked for, 2BL, prematurely announced his death due to a pre-prepared statement about it mistakenly being faxed to the news room. Other broadcast media followed up on the announcement but it was retracted within an hour. He died the next day, aged 47.
- Hiroo Onoda: this Japanese soldier survived for decades in the Philippines jungle, believing that World War II had not ended. Onoda, with three other soldiers who accompanied him for some years, continued to fight the war, killing many local Filipinos. Although numerous attempts were made (e.g., by leaving leaflets) to persuade them that the war was over, every such effort was regarded as an enemy trick. Onoda—who was officially declared dead in 1959—only gave himself up in 1974 when his commanding officer, who had long since retired from the military and become a bookseller, was sent to the island to order Onoda to surrender. He returned to Japan a national hero, and wrote a book No Surrender: My Thirty-Year War. Onoda died on January 16, 2014, at the age of 91.
- Roscoe Orman: On August 8, 2002, it was revealed that one of the actors who portrayed Gordon on the television series Sesame Street had recently died, leading many people to believe that it was Orman who died. It was, in fact, Matt Robinson who had died; Robinson, who also wrote for the series, originated the role of Gordon when it started airing in 1969.
- Sharon Osbourne: in October 2004, a draft obituary of rock star Ozzy Osbourne's wife was accidentally published on the ABC News website owing to a technical error.

== P ==
- Al Pacino: On May 10, 2015, a fake news website reported that the actor had been found dead in his home at the age of 75.
- Poonam Pandey: The Indian actress faked her death by cervical cancer via an Instagram post on February 2, 2024, to raise awareness for the disease.
- Valentin Paniagua (former Peruvian president): was reported dead by congressman Víctor Andrés García Belaúnde during a speech being made by Peru's Prime Minister Jorge Del Castillo to the Peruvian Congress in August 2006. Fifteen minutes later, Paniagua's attending physician announced that the former president had been admitted to the Intensive Care Unit but was alive and recovering. He died in October 2006.
- Eduardo Paolozzi: the artist's death was incorrectly reported in a magazine when he suffered a near-fatal stroke in 2001. He died in 2005.
- La Parka II: On October 21, 2019, the Mexican wrestler was in a match against wrestler Rush for the promotion AAA when he was injured when he accidentally jumped out of the ring and landed head first on the steel barrier and concrete floor. The next day, a fake press release appeared stating that La Parka II died from his injuries but AAA confirmed this was false. La Parka II died on January 11, 2020. AAA later confirmed that his death was directly related to the head injury.
- John Partridge, an astrologer whose death Jonathan Swift (writing under a pseudonym) 'predicted' in a 1708 hoax almanac and later 'confirmed', prompting numerous anti-Partridge newspaper obituaries. (See also Titan Leeds.) He died in either 1714 or 1715.
- Joe Paterno: The former head coach of the Penn State Nittany Lions football team from 1966 to 2011 had been hospitalized in serious condition for complications from lung cancer, a tweet by Pennsylvania State University's student blog Onward State on the evening of January 21, 2012, reported that Paterno had died. This information was picked up by CBS Sports, and other news outlets soon followed, while CBS eventually removed the story after members of the Paterno family denied the reports of Joe's death. Later that night, Onward State's managing editor Devon Edwards officially retracted the story, stating that "In this day and age, getting it first often conflicts with getting it right, but our intention was never to fall into that chasm. All I can do now is promise that in the future, we will exercise caution, restraint, and humility." Devon also announced that he would immediately resign from his position as managing editor for Onward State. Other reports at the time indicated Paterno had been taken off his respirator and given Last Rites, which the Paterno family also denied. Paterno died the next morning.
- Natalya Pavlova: this Lithuanian 27-year-old went missing in November 2007, and was declared dead a few weeks later when a body found in a forest was identified by her parents as hers. However, in January 2008 she turned up alive when she was arrested for shoplifting in the city of Klaipėda. It turned out that she had been living there with her boyfriend. It was not known who the dead woman was.
- Pelé: the Brazilian soccer player was erroneously reported dead by a Twitter account linked to CNN's morning show, New Day, on March 28, 2014. The report was retracted after Pelé himself confirmed he was still alive. He died on December 29, 2022.
- Sean Penn: On January 12, 2016, Buzzfeed and Daily Media Buzz reported that the actor had been found murdered in his home.
- Jose Luis Perales: On August 7, 2023, several media outlets reported that the Spanish singer-songwriter died of a heart attack. The report was debunked by Perales who posted a video on his social media while vacationing in London.
- Javier Pérez de Cuéllar: The 98-year old former Secretary-General of the United Nations was the victim of a death hoax in October 2018. The hoax was started by a Twitter account claiming to be Interior Minister Carlos Moran. The account was later deleted. Pérez de Cuellar lived until he died in March 2020 aged 100.
- Vuk Peric: a Serbian pensioner who put his own death notice in the newspaper in 1997 to see who would turn up to his funeral. After watching the funeral from a distance, he revealed himself and thanked everyone for attending.
- William "The Refrigerator" Perry: In 2013 Perry's death was erroneously reported by TigerNet, a fan site of the Clemson Tigers football team, who confused the former NFL defensive tackle with another person named William Perry. Perry was, at the time, watching his former team, the Chicago Bears, play a preseason game against the Carolina Panthers.
- Tom Petty: After the musician was found unresponsive at his home on October 2, 2017, CBS News reported that afternoon that Petty had died, citing sources with the Los Angeles Police Department, and other outlets subsequently reported the story; however, the claim was subsequently refuted, and the LAPD said it was not officially involved in the matter to begin with. Petty did ultimately die later that day.
- Wade Phillips: The longtime professional American football coach was the subject of a death hoax in September 2025, several months after being forced to take leave from his position with the San Antonio Brahmas due to health issues. Phillips, who was deeply upset by the hoax, indicated that those health issues had been resolved and were due to a medication error that had since been corrected.
- Jim Pierce: this resident of Smackover, Arkansas, was thought to have died in 1926 when a body identified as his by over 50 people was found in an empty railroad oil tank car. His son took the corpse back to Texas for burial, but was met there by Jim Pierce, very much alive. It was not clear who the dead man was.
- Samy Pillai: a Malaysian man who was certified dead in June 2005 after his wrecked motorcycle was found near an unidentifiable body. In March 2007 it was discovered that he had in fact survived the accident when he was found 300 km away, partly paralysed and unable to speak; his identity was confirmed by thumbprints. It was not known what he had been doing in the intervening two years.
- Brad Pitt: Following the announcement of the American actor's divorce from Angelina Jolie in September 2016, a website impersonating Fox News claimed that Pitt had committed suicide by shooting himself at a gun range.
- Jeanne Pouchain: the 53-year-old French resident was erroneously reported dead in February 2016, in a case of revenge by a former cleaner who believed she had not been paid properly and had her attorney declare Pouchain legally dead. The administrative error effectively barred Pouchain from French society, as all forms of identification, insurance and bank accounts were cancelled, to the point where she three times (all unsuccessfully) attempted to legitimately die via suicide.
- Velupillai Prabhakaran: the Tamil Tiger leader was reported by the Sri Lanka Broadcasting Corporation as being among the dead or missing in the December 2004 tsunami. This was taken by many to suggest that he was specifically dead. The corporation later retracted the report. He was killed in a battle against Sri Lankan Army troops in May 2009.
- Perez Prado: Following the death of his brother Pantaleon, who was also known as Perez Prado in 1983, the press inaccurately reported his death. Prado died in September 1989.
- Ray Price: Numerous media outlets, from Rolling Stone to the USA Today, reported the country music legend had died from cancer on December 15, 2013. The information came from Price's son, Cliff, who posted via Facebook his father's apparent death, but it was later retracted, according to The Tennessean (which also published a news story on Price's death that was later removed). Price died the next day, with a family spokesman confirming the death.

== R ==
- Rainier III, Prince of Monaco: The ruler of Monaco was erroneously reported as having died, by a March 2005 issue of Time, in their South Pacific edition. At the time Rainier was in an intensive care unit of a hospital, due to a lung infection, and would die on April 6, 2005.
- Augie Ratner, a former featherweight boxer, published his own obituary in the Minneapolis Star-Tribune in 1971. A skeptical Johnny Blood called Ratner out on the bluff, and the two would later place a $1,000 bet, legally placed in each other's will, on who would survive longer. Ratner died in 1979, thus making Blood (who died in 1985) the winner.
- Mino Raiola, an Italian football agent known for having represented a number of well-known players was purported to have died on April 28, 2022. In January 2022, Raiola was admitted to San Raffaele Hospital in Milan. Minutes later, Raiola's family and a doctor treating him, indicated that Raiola was "fighting" for his life and denounced the death reports as false. Raiola died two days later, on April 30.
- Ronald Reagan (former US president), in the CNN.com incident. CNN also included fragments of Reagan's life history in a premature obituary of Fidel Castro in the same incident. Reagan, who was bedridden due to Alzheimer's disease at that time, died on June 5, 2004.
- Johnny Rebel: A 2003 interview with the American country singer-songwriter known for his white supremacist lyrics mentioned he had been the subject of several death hoaxes, one of which claimed he had been shot during a war against the FBI. Rebel died on September 3, 2016.
- Lou Reed (musician), reported dead by numerous US radio stations in 2001, caused by a hoax email (purporting to be from Reuters) which said he had died of a drug overdose. Reed died on October 27, 2013.
- Bass Reeves (lawman), reported dead by several newspapers in 1891; the article claimed he had been killed by outlaw Ned Christie. Bass died in 1910.
- Jeremy Renner, American actor, was reported to have died on June 23, 2023, when a fake tweet purporting to be from The Guardian spread on Twitter, claiming that Renner died in a "freak escalator accident". At the time, Renner was recovering from a near-fatal snow plow accident.
- Adam Rich: the television actor was reported to have been murdered in a 1996 tribute issue of Might magazine. It was all an elaborate hoax by the magazine's editor Dave Eggers in collusion with Rich, and was intended to satirize the media exploitation of stars who die young. He died on January 7, 2023.
- Pedro Rico: the mayor of Madrid was identified by anarchists when attempting to flee the city during the Spanish Civil War in November 1936, beaten and sent back to Madrid. Newspapers supporting the Nationalist faction incorrectly reported that the incident ended with Rico's execution. He died in 1957.
- Tanya Roberts, actress known for her roles in the TV series Charlie's Angels and the James Bond movie A View to a Kill, was hospitalized on December 24, 2020. On January 3, 2021, it was reported that Roberts had died, with media citing a statement from Roberts's publicist. TMZ subsequently reported that Roberts was alive, and Roberts's partner confirmed this, with the premature announcement of her death attributed to a miscommunication. Roberts died the following day.
- Axl Rose: On December 3, 2014, a fake news report circulated on the internet claiming that the singer had been found dead at home. In response, Rose tweeted "If I'm dead do I still have to pay taxes?"
- Raymond Roth, a 47-year-old man from Massapequa, New York, was reported missing on July 28, 2012, after having gone for a swim off Jones Beach. After an extensive search turned up nothing, Roth was initially presumed dead. He was found alive several few days later, apparently having faked his own death to claim on life insurance policies. Roth was arrested in March 2013, when he was arrested for impersonating a police officer and attempting to lure a woman into his van. He received a prison sentence for both crimes in April 2014.
- Amnon Rubinstein, Israeli academic and retired politician, whose death was announced in 1999 by Knesset (parliamentary) speaker Avraham Burg following a hoax telephone call. Rubinstein was in hospital at the time for a minor complaint. Rubinstein died in 2024.
- Noela Rukundo, a Burundian-Australian woman, was presumed dead after her husband hired hitmen to kill her on January 21, 2015, while she was in Burundi for her stepmother's funeral. However, the hitmen instead let her go, and gave Rukundo evidence to incriminate her husband. After mourners left a funeral held for her on February 22, 2015, where her husband claimed that she had been killed in a tragic accident, she arrived at their house in Melbourne to confront him for trying to have her killed.
- Austin Lee Russell, American television personality better known as Chumlee, was the victim of at least two death hoaxes. On May 14, 2013, a fake news article reported that Chumlee had died of a marijuana overdose. Another hoax article that surfaced in March 2014 claimed that he died of a heart attack.
- Bertrand Russell: the philosopher was reported dead in the Japanese press in 1920 when he was suffering from pneumonia. Some sources say the reports were a deliberate form of revenge by Japanese journalists whom Russell had refused to meet due to his illness. His supposed death may also have been reported in The Times. (It is also sometimes said that by way of apology, The Times allowed Russell to pre-write his own obituary for publication on his actual death but the obituary does not read as if it could be by him; the confusion may be that in 1937 he wrote an imaginary Times obituary for his own entertainment, which is briefly quoted at the end of his obituary in The New York Times). Russell died in 1970, over 50 years later.

== S ==
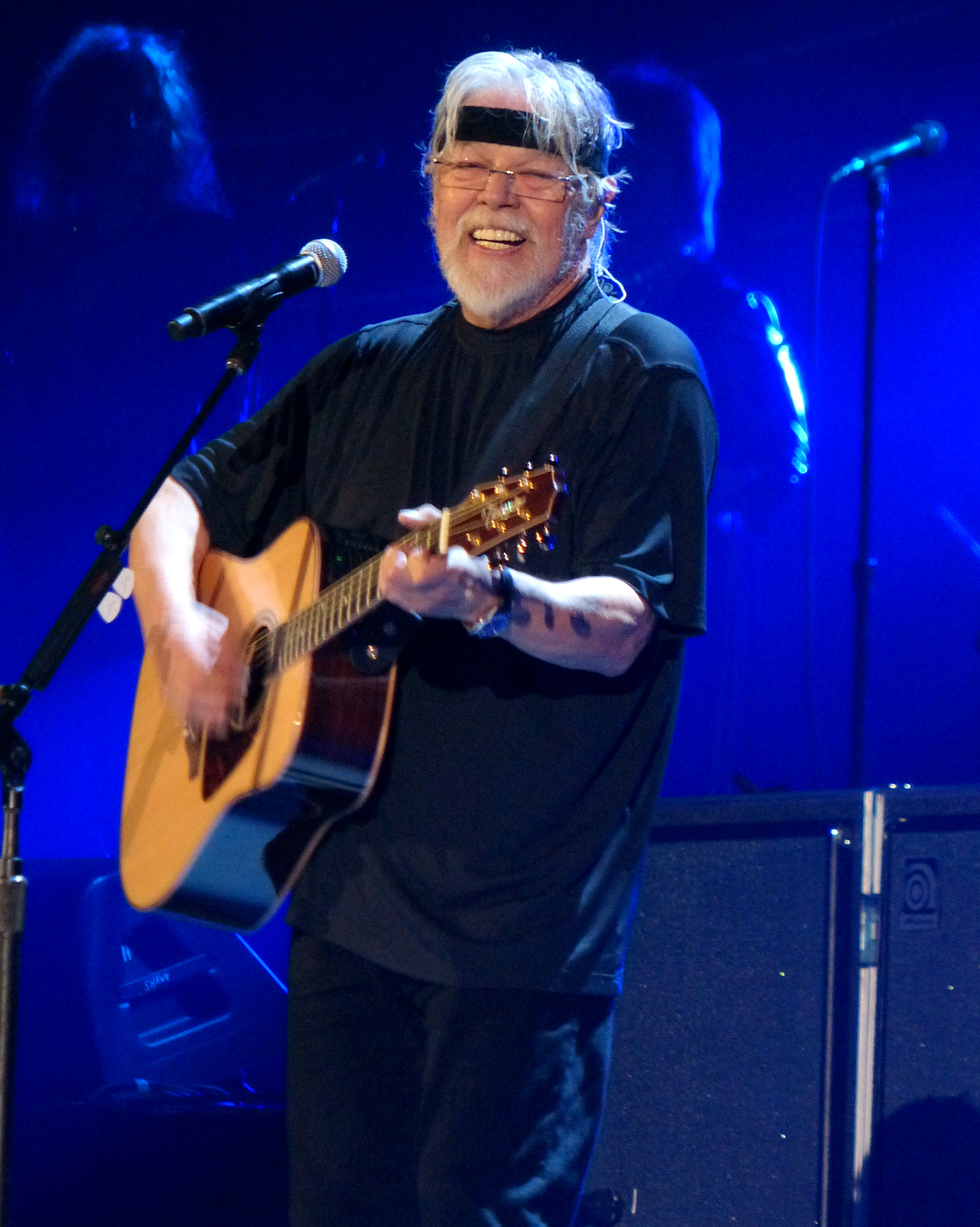
Rock musician Bob Seger, was the subject of a false obituary, after he was confused with folk music veteran Pete Seeger.

- Abolqasem Salavati, an Iranian judge, was reported to have been assassinated on 5 January 2023, however, the head of Mizan News Agency confirmed that he is alive.
- Hugo Jose Sanchez: This British father-of-four was a web developer for HMV and faked his death to claim £850,000 and get his family out of poverty. He was caught when his life insurance company found Hugo's fingerprints on his own death certificate. Both he and his wife were subsequently arrested.
- Carlos Santana, American guitarist, was reported to have been found dead in his car on September 30, 2015, with the claim being made by a reporter affiliated with CBC News. Santana's team dispelled the rumor on his Facebook.
- Gabe Saporta, the Uruguayan-born lead singer of the American pop-rock band Cobra Starship, was the subject of a death hoax in August 2008 that included a fake MTV News page and death certificate. Saporta debunked the rumor himself on his Myspace page.
- Ben Savage, an American actor, was reported dead in a car accident in September 2006. The hoax report is believed to have originated on MySpace.
- Jimmy Savile (broadcaster) in 1994, when then-DJ Chris Morris announced on BBC Radio 1 (as a joke) that he had collapsed and died. Savile began legal action against Morris. He actually died on October 29, 2011. (See also Michael Heseltine.)
- Terri Schiavo: a draft of the brain damaged patient's obituary accidentally appeared briefly on CBS's website on March 28, 2005, in advance of her death. Schiavo died from starvation on March 31, 2005, after removal of her feeding tube on March 18, 2005.
- Arthur M. Schlesinger Jr. (historian): his death was referred to in the Pittsburgh Post-Gazette on November 29, 2005. The newspaper retracted the reference on December 2, saying, "We are embarrassed but happy for Mr Schlesinger." Schlesinger died February 28, 2007.
- Arnold Schwarzenegger: On August 28, 2015, it was reported that the actor had died from a heart attack at 68. The rumor originated with a fake news website.
- Steven Seagal: This American actor was the subject of at least two death hoaxes. In May 2013, a fake Facebook page titled "R.I.P. Steven Seagal" fooled social media users, and another false report from August 2015 claimed that he died of a massive heart attack.
- James Ford Seale, who took part in the 1964 Ku Klux Klan murder of two black hitchhikers in Mississippi, was found not far away in 2005—despite newspapers including The Clarion-Ledger having reported him dead, apparently because Seale's family had said he was. Seale was located by the brother of one of the victims, and was convicted in 2007, having previously had all charges dropped when the case was originally investigated. Seale died on August 2, 2011.
- Bob Seger: After the death of folk singer Pete Seeger on January 27, 2014, a number of confused Twitter and Facebook users posted tributes to rock singer Bob Seger instead. Others, apparently believing that Bob Seger was Pete Seeger's son, offered condolences to Bob on the loss of his father. The two singers were in fact of no known relation, and Bob Seger was very much alive and well.
- Katharine Sergava (Oklahoma! actress & dancer), whose obituary was published in 2003 in the Daily Telegraph and a few days later in The New York Times. The latter newspaper blamed the former for the mistake. Sergava died November 26, 2005
- William Seward After the assassination of Abraham Lincoln, on April 15, 1865, many newspapers erroneously reported that William Seward and other members of Lincoln's cabinet had been killed, with the New York Herald reporting "Washington was thrown into intense excitement a few minutes before eleven o'clock this evening, by the announcement that the President and Secretary Seward had been assassinated and were dead." Seward died in 1872.
- Rebekah Shelton, former Big Brother contestant, was reported to have died on January 12, 2018, following a message posted on her Twitter account. Shelton claimed the account had been hacked.
- Sinbad (comedian) was the subject of a death hoax. On March 14, 2007, it was reported that the comedian had died of a heart attack. He later spoke with a reporter from the Associated Press about the hoax.
- John Singleton, American director, was the subject of disputed death reports on April 29, 2019, five days after suffering a massive stroke. Singleton was taken off life support and died later that day.
- Dennis Skinner, Labour MP for Bolsover 1970-2019 was wrongly reported by community radio station Chesterfield Radio to have died on September 25, 2020. Skinner's nephew contacted them to correct the error.
- Franklin Webster Smith, an eccentric 19th century visionary who briefly enjoyed substantial support for his idea of redesigning Washington, D.C., to be a "capital of beauty and cultural knowledge," featuring a massive array of replicas of classical architecture. (His ideas were sidelined by the Panic of 1893 and ultimately upended by changing aesthetic tastes that led to the McMillan Plan.) His obituary inexplicably appeared three years before his death in 1911.
- Jaclyn Smith (Charlie's Angels actress and model) was reported to have shot herself in Honduras in 2009. The rumor began when a Honduran newspaper reported that her 'Angels' stunt double had shot herself, and several sites misread the news. Smith took to Twitter and Facebook to dispel the false reports. "Jaclyn is safe and home with her family. She is not in Honduras. It is a lie."
- Mark E. Smith was erroneously reported dead by the BBC in March 2017 on his 60th birthday. Smith died in January 2018.
- George Soros On April 18, 2013, Reuters reported that billionaire financier George Soros had died. The report, which was taken down after 30 minutes stated that "George Soros, who died XXX at age XXX, was a predatory and hugely successful financier and investor, who argued paradoxically for years against the same sort of free-wheeling capitalism that made him billions," and many other "less than flattering things" The Guardian reported. The report was quickly taken down, and Reuters soon released a statement saying "Reuters erroneously published an advance obituary of financier and philanthropist George Soros. A spokesman for Soros said that the New York-based financier is alive and well. Reuters regrets the error."
- Britney Spears and then-boyfriend Justin Timberlake (musicians) were reported to have died in a car crash by two Texas DJs as a joke in 2001. The radio station (KEGL) was sued and the DJs were fired. The car crash story is thought to have originated as a rumour on the Internet. Spears was the victim of another death hoax on December 26, 2016, when someone hacked Sony Music's and Bob Dylan's Twitter accounts, and posted tweets claiming that she had died.
- Sylvester Stallone: The actor was subject to an Internet death hoax on September 3, 2016. In February 2018, with another hoax circulating, he posted to Instagram that he was alive.
- Ronald Stan: In 1977, this 32-year-old Canadian man mysteriously vanished. It was speculated that he may have died in a fire, and he was officially declared dead in 1986. However, in 2014, investigators found that Stan was alive and residing in Oklahoma under the name Jeff Walton. Relatives reported that Stan had a wife and children in Canada at the time of his disappearance, but in the intervening years he had apparently married another woman and started a family. His Oklahoman relatives reported that they had no knowledge of his previous identity. However, at least one Canadian relative claimed to have known that Stan was alive all this time, and was shocked to learn that he had been declared dead. Stan's motive for disappearing was not immediately known.
- Martha Stewart: Stewart was falsely reported dead in February 2012 by Variety. Her actual death occurred in February 2021.
- Randall L. Stephenson: On July 26, 2009, the AT&T CEO was falsely reported as having died after falling into a coma following a massive cocaine binge during a party at his mansion. The report originated from CNN's iReport website, although it was later taken down. Although the hackers who created the false report have never been identified, it is suspected that they were 4chan users who did the hack in retaliation for AT&T's decision to block the site for its broadband customers, a decision which had been provoked by an earlier denial-of-service attack against one of AT&T's customers that originated from a 4chan user. Access to 4chan on AT&T broadband services has since been restored.
- John Stonehouse MP: in 1974 the British politician faked his own death (by drowning in Miami) in order to escape financial difficulties and marry his mistress. He was subsequently discovered in Australia—where police, alerted when he paid a huge sum of cash into a bank, thought he might be Lord Lucan—and imprisoned. In the meantime, a number of newspapers published obituaries of him, despite no body having been found. Stonehouse died April 14, 1988.
- Kevin Stoney: The actor was reported dead by fanzine Doctor Who Bulletin in 1987; his subsequent appearance at a Doctor Who fan event drew gasps of disbelief. Stoney died in 2008.
- Red Storey: the Canadian football player and ice hockey referee was reported dead by a Montreal radio station in the 1970s when a Montreal Star employee misheard another saying "Red's story is dead" (referring to sports editor Red Fisher). The employee told his wife, who phoned the radio station—which then broadcast the 'news' without checking it. Storey died on March 15, 2006.
- Julie Strain: On January 13, 2020, Malibu Bay Films reported the death of the B-movie actress, later to be refuted by her husband. Strain died on January 10, 2021.
- Heath Streak: On August 23, 2023, Henry Olonga tweeted that Zimbabwean cricketer Heath Streak died. A few hours later, Olonga tweeted that Streak was very much alive. Streak himself spoke on the matter, saying that he would not die soon. But he died 11 days later, on September 3.
- Sven-Olof Svensson: this 81-year-old Swedish man was reported dead in 2014 by the Jönköpings-Posten after his sister reported his death when he was taken into the hospital "unwell".
- Dave Swarbrick: the folk musician's obituary was published in the Daily Telegraph in April 1999 after he was admitted to hospital with a chest infection, prompting the quip: "It's not the first time I have died in Coventry." His subsequent band was named Swarb's Lazarus as an ironic reference to the event. Swarbrick died in 2016.

== T ==
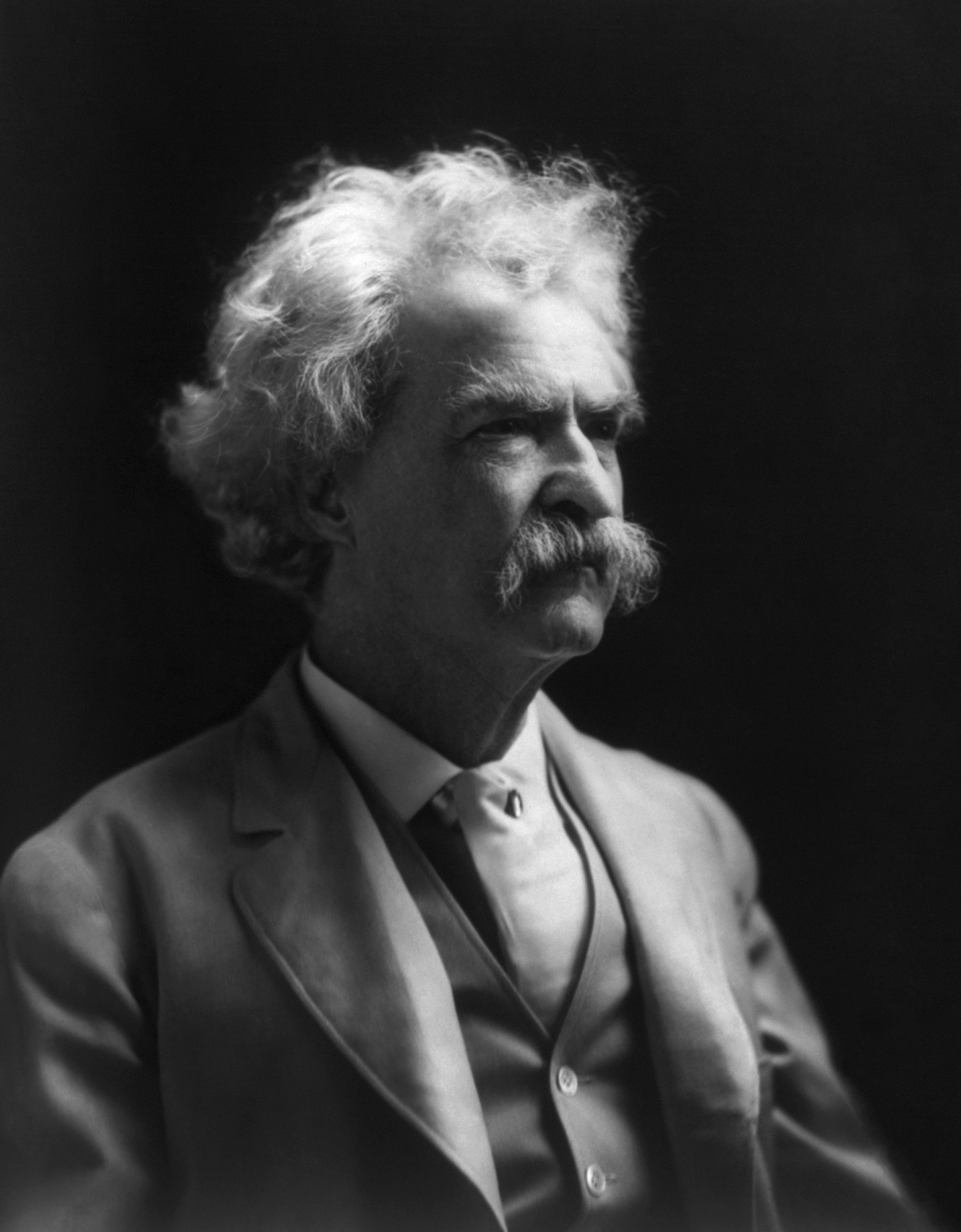
Mark Twain: "The report of my death was an exaggeration"

- Satoshi Tajiri: A rumor spread on Twitter that the Japanese game designer known for creating Pokémon had died in the 2011 Tōhoku earthquake and tsunami. Nintendo of America subsequently confirmed Tajiri was unharmed.
- Gonçalo Ribeiro Telles: the online newspaper Observador published the news of his death on his 98th birthday (May 24, 2020); it was corrected some hours later. Ribeiro Telles died November 11, 2020.
- Shashi Tharoor: Times Now tweeted that the Indian politician Shashi Tharoor died on December 12, 2017, after the death of actor and producer Shashi Kapoor. Tharoor tweeted in response "We're getting condolence calls in the office! Reports of my demise are, if not exaggerated, at least premature."
- Margaret Thatcher: Text-message reports that "Thatcher has died" caused a stir at a 2009 Canadian political event, and officials in Prime Minister Stephen Harper's office had begun preparing a statement of condolence, until it was determined that the deceased Thatcher in question was actually Transport Minister John Baird's cat. Thatcher actually died on April 8, 2013.
- Frank Thomas: On December 29, 2023, Fox News showed images of Frank Thomas listed with the caption "1968-2023". They later issued an on-air apology, stating they were trying to eulogize a different baseball player, also named Frank Thomas, who was born in 1929. Thomas responded with a post on Twitter, stating that he was still alive.
- Orlando Thomas: A former professional football player who had Lou Gehrig's disease, Thomas was incorrectly reported as dead by the official website of the Minnesota Vikings, his former team, on October 28, 2009. The story of Thomas's death was then picked up and re-reported by various news services, including the Associated Press. He later died in 2014.
- Donald Walter Trautman (Bishop of the Roman Catholic Diocese of Erie, Pennsylvania) was reported dead in the edition of April 4, 2007, of the Vatican newspaper L'Osservatore Romano; in fact it was his predecessor Bishop Michael Murphy who had just died. "I told people that there was an early resurrection", Trautman said. The Tablet printed a cartoon about the incident, depicting one angel at a reception desk telling another: "Bishop Trautman's just e-mailed us with a cancellation." Trautman died on February 26, 2022, at the age of 85.
- Donald Trump, the 45th and 47th President of the United States, was announced as having died on September 20, 2023, when the Twitter account of his son, Donald Trump Jr., was hacked.
- Mark Twain: American author, was falsely reported dead twice:
  1. In 1897, a journalist was sent to inquire after Twain's health, thinking he was near death; in fact it was his cousin who was very ill. Although (contrary to popular belief) no obituary was published, Twain recounted the event in the New York Journal of June 2, 1897, including his famous words: "The report of my death was an exaggeration" (which is usually misquoted, e.g. as "The rumours of my death have been greatly exaggerated", or "Reports of my death are greatly exaggerated").
  2. On May 4, 1907, when people lost track of a yacht he was traveling on, The New York Times published an article saying he might have been lost at sea. In fact, the yacht had been held up by fog, and Twain had disembarked. Twain read the article, and cleared up the story by writing a humorous account in The New York Times the following day.

Twain died in 1910.

== U ==
- Ishinosuke Uwano: in April 2006 this Japanese soldier, missing since World War II, was found to be living in Ukraine aged 83, where he had married and had a family. He had been officially declared dead in 2000. At the end of the war, he had remained in the Soviet Union for unknown reasons; he said the Soviet government subsequently prevented him from contacting his Japanese relatives. Following his discovery he visited Japan for the first time in over 60 years; he could remember little of Japan and had even largely forgotten how to speak Japanese. Uwano died in 2013.

== V ==
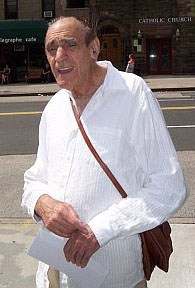
Erroneous reports of the death of Abe Vigoda became a running joke

- Dick Van Dyke (actor): on February 12, 2026, The Pussycat Dolls singer Ashley Roberts announced on the iHeartRadio program Breakfast Show that Van Dyke was reported dead. This was a misstatement of the death of Dawson's Creek star James Van Der Beek the previous day. Roberts was corrected and apologized for the mistake.
- Paul Vance, composer of the song "Itsy Bitsy Teenie Weenie Yellow Polka Dot Bikini", was reported dead in September 2006 by Associated Press, followed by the rest of the media. The reports even caused racehorses owned by Vance to be scratched from races. In fact, the dead man was a former salesman and painting contractor called Paul Van Valkenburgh, who had told his wife he had written the song many years earlier under the stage name Paul Vance. When pursued by an Associated Press reporter immediately after the scam was discovered, the impostor's widow, who had not yet been provided with evidence of her late husband's wrongdoing, said she was not certain whether it was Vance or her husband who had really written the song. The real Paul Vance died on May 30, 2022.
- Abe Vigoda (actor): in 1982, People magazine referred to him as 'the late Abe Vigoda'. He then posed for a photograph showing him sitting up in a coffin, holding the magazine in question. The same mistake was made in 1987 when a reporter for television station WWOR, Channel 9 in Secaucus, New Jersey, mistakenly referred to him as "the late Abe Vigoda". She realized and corrected her mistake the next day. Vigoda later claimed that during the 1980s, the widespread belief that he was dead cost him work. Erroneous reports of Vigoda's death became something of a running joke, such as in television sketches, through the rest of Vigoda's life (further aided by Vigoda's longevity, as he would live to be 94 years old). The website "Abe Vigoda Status" featured nothing but a smiling photo of Vigoda, a live clock calibrated to the day and second, and the advisory "Abe Vigoda is..." followed by the up-to-the-minute information of "alive" until he actually died on 26 January 2016, whereupon the website went offline due to the number of requests, then eventually returned with the update that Vigoda was indeed dead.

== W ==
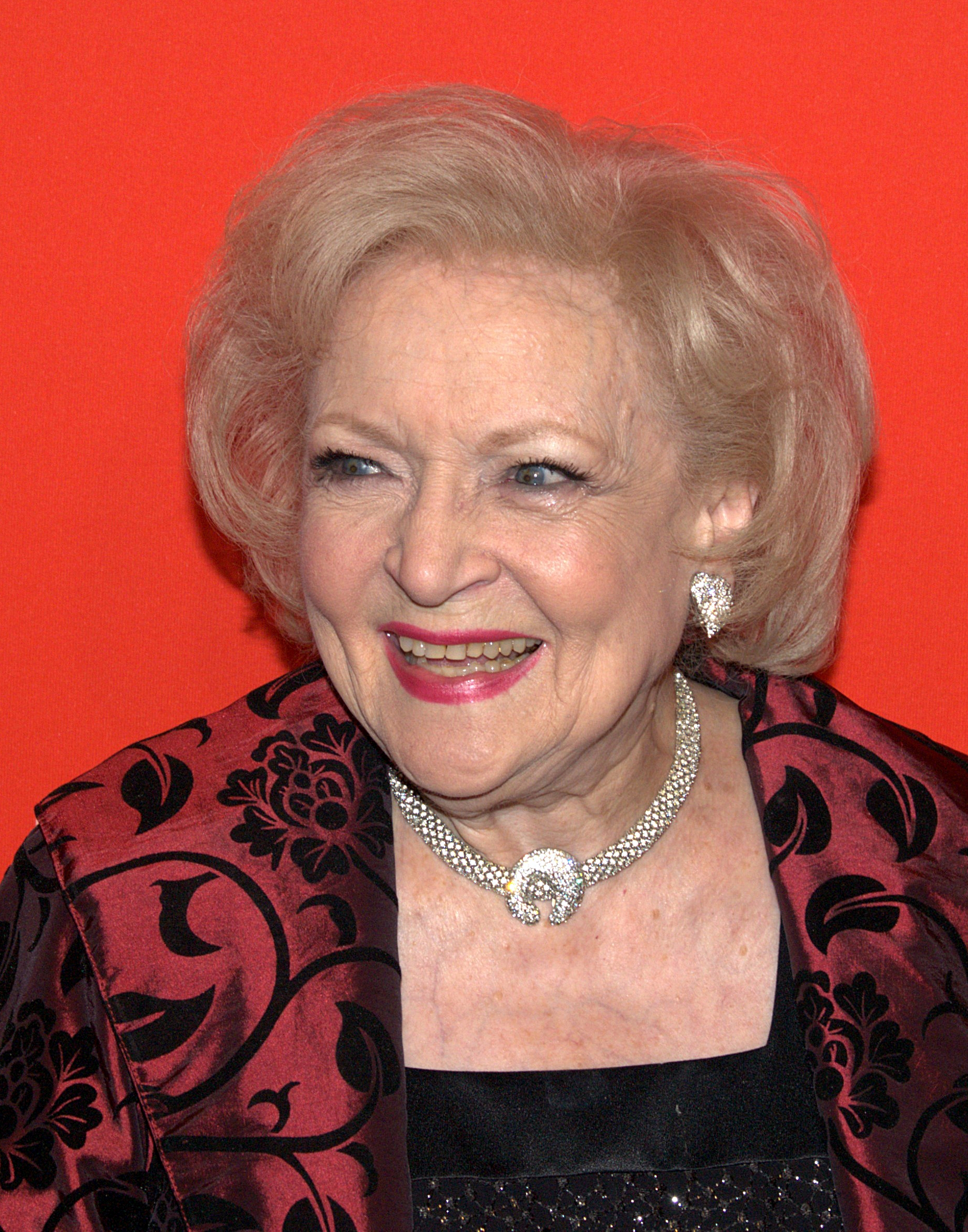
American actress Betty White was the subject of a premature obituary on two occasions

- Kallistos Ware: The English bishop and theologian of the Eastern Orthodox Church born "Timothy Ware" was falsely reported dead on August 14, 2022, at the age of 87. The error occurred due to a misinterpretation of an email sent by bishop Ware's carers asking for the continued prayers of his friends and colleagues as he was in a critical condition. Ware died ten days later on August 24, 2022, at the age of 87.
- Elsie Waring: in 1963, this 35-year-old was certified dead by three doctors at Willesden General Hospital, London. Several hours later she gasped and started breathing while being lifted into her coffin.
- William James Wanless, a Canadian medical doctor who worked as a missionary in India, was reported dead there in 1922. Wanless actually continued to serve in India until his retirement in 1928, and he died at home in California in 1933.
- Kate Webb: in 1971 the journalist was part of a group captured in the Cambodian jungle by North Vietnamese troops. Official reports claimed that a body that had been found and cremated was hers, and a box of bones said to be hers was delivered to Reuters. The New York Times published an obituary. She emerged from captivity over three weeks later, having endured forced marches, interrogations, and two strains of malaria. Webb died in 2007.
- Harry Delyne Weed, the inventor of Weed non-skid tire chains, was reported dead in numerous publications (including Time magazine and the New York Herald Tribune) in 1927 after a reporter for the Jackson, Michigan Citizen Patriot wrote that the recently deceased Mrs. Alice Weed from Jackson had been the inventor's widow. It later emerged that Alice Weed was no relation, and that both the inventor and his wife were alive and well.
- Kanye West: was the subject of an Internet hoax news report on October 20, 2009, claiming that he had been killed in a car crash. The rumor quickly spread via social networking websites such as Twitter, prompting West's then-girlfriend Amber Rose to respond "This 'RIP Kanye West' topic is not funny and it's NOT TRUE!"
- Darene Springs Weston: In December 2015, this 43-year-old woman from Chester, South Carolina, used forged documents in an attempt to declare herself dead so that she could avoid going to jail on drunk driving charges. After an investigation, she was arrested and charged with obstruction of justice.
- Alan Whicker (journalist), while reporting on the Korean War. He was flying with an aerial spotter in a Piper Aztec plane behind enemy lines, as part of a story. Although his plane landed safely, a similar craft was shot down on the same day, and was assumed to be Whicker's plane. The resulting newspaper obituary commented on his lack of achievement (Whicker then being far less well-known than he was later). He died on July 12, 2013.
- Betty White (actress and comedian): On September 3, 2014, a story from the Empire News Network (which typically publishes outright hoaxes) reported that White, at 92, "dyed comfortably in her Los Angeles home"; the article went on to describe White's longtime use of hair dye. The headline was deliberately written as a pun to appear as if it were an obituary, which confused many and led her agent to clarify that she was still alive. White, at the time, was filming episodes for the TV series Hot in Cleveland, on which she was a regular cast member. She died on December 31, 2021.
- Peter Whittingham: English footballer, most known for his decade at Cardiff City, was mistakenly reported dead by veteran journalist Terry Phillips on the Dai Sport website on March 17, 2020. Whittingham was in fact alive at the time, and hospitalised with head injuries after a fall. He died two days later.
- Slim Whitman: the country singer was reported dead in January 2008 by a radio DJ and by the Nashville Tennessean's website, apparently sparked by rumours he had died. "It seems like every 10 years something weird happens like that", he said. Whitman died in June 2013.
- Paul Wight, better known by his professional wrestling ring name The Big Show, was reported killed by WWE on June 16, 2017, by satire news site The Onion stating that Wight was killed after a seven-year-old boy wandered into a steel cage during a live event in Indianapolis. The article, meant to lampoon the real-life killing of Harambe, a gorilla in a Cincinnati zoo, and clearly a satire and not a premature obituary, received criticism for The Onion satiring the murder of an actual person as well as many wrestling fans legitimately believing Wight was dead.
- Maurice Williams: After the husband of writer John Steinbeck's literary agent was reported to have died when his plane was shot down in flames over Germany during World War II, Steinbeck wrote an effusive obituary which was published in the New York Herald Tribune and widely syndicated. However, Williams had survived the crash, and had been rescued and spirited away by the French underground, which eventually returned him to his air corps unit in England.
- Mike Williams, a former NFL wide receiver for the Buffalo Bills and Tampa Bay Buccaneers, was severely injured in a construction accident on September 1, 2023, and was reported dead on September 5. The following day, Williams's agent confirmed that Williams was alive but on life support. Williams died on September 12.
- Philip Williams: in June 1982, this British soldier was knocked unconscious by an explosion during the Battle of Mount Tumbledown in the Falklands War, and left for dead. When he came to, the rest of the British soldiers had gone. Williams' parents were informed of his 'death' and a memorial service held for him. It took him nearly two months to find his way back to civilisation, braving extreme weather. He was then criticized by the media and fellow soldiers, who accused him of desertion.
- Rich Williams, guitarist in the band Kansas, whose obituary was published in a number of New England newspapers after the death of Eric de Boer of Kingston, New Hampshire. de Boer had been impersonating Williams for decades, claiming that after returning from Vietnam (where he had been held as a POW) he had joined Kansas, using the name "Rich Williams" as a stage name. The real Williams wrote in an e-mail sent to The Topeka Capital-Journal that he had known about the impersonation for five years and thought it was "really wacky stuff", but added that he respected de Boer for his service in Vietnam. It was later discovered that there was no evidence that de Boer had ever been in the military, let alone that he had been a Vietnam POW.
- Walter Williams: On February 26, 2014, this 78-year-old Mississippi man was declared dead by a hospice nurse. This was confirmed by the county coroner, and Williams' body was placed in a body bag and brought to a funeral home for embalming. However, funeral home workers noticed movement in the bag. They called for an ambulance, and paramedics confirmed that Williams had a pulse and was breathing. He was transported to a hospital where he began to recover, much to the delight of all involved. Williams actually died of natural causes just over two weeks later, on March 13.
- Edward Osborne Wilson (biologist and environmentalist), was listed as dead in a 2005 San Francisco Chronicle article. He died on December 26, 2021.
- Mara Wilson (actress) was listed as dead on the Internet Movie Database in 2000, with the cause being "broken neck".
- Owen Wilson was reported to have died in a snowboarding accident.
- Robert Anton Wilson was reported dead in February 1994 in a hoax story that purported to be an obituary published in the Los Angeles Times, circulated on the Internet by a prankster in Cambridge, Massachusetts. Wilson then wrote an essay titled "I Got Run Over on the Information Superhighway", which was published in his next book Cosmic Trigger III: My Life After Death. In reality, Wilson continued living until 2007.
- Jesse Winchester: the songwriter was prematurely reported dead by several sources on April 7, 2014. He was in fact gravely ill, and died on April 11.
- Bennie Wint: this American thought the police were after him and wanted to arrest him on drug charges, and faked his death while on a honeymoon in Daytona Beach, Florida in September 1989. Wint was missing and presumed dead for 20 years, leaving his fiancée and four-year-old son behind. Twenty years later, he was pulled over for not having a light bulb in his licence plate, and subsequently confessed. While he was living under a false identity, he had had another child.
- Norman Wisdom: the British comedian was reported dead by Sky News on December 28, 2008, with a pre-prepared video obituary having been accidentally published. Wisdom died on October 4, 2010.
- Heinz Wolff: the German-British scientist and television personality was reported dead by The Sun, resulting in obituaries in The Times and The Independent. They had mistaken him for his namesake the psychiatrist Dr. Heinz Wolff. Wolff (not the psychiatrist) died on 15 December 2017 aged 89.
- John Wooden: an online picture gallery of the legendary basketball coach on The Washington Post's website on June 3, 2010, was headlined "John Wooden dies at 99". Wooden was at the time hospitalized in grave condition, and he died the next day.

== Y ==
- Paltan Yadav was officially declared dead in 1980 by relatives in order to steal his land in Uttar Pradesh, India. Rendered penniless and unable to afford to marry, he became a holy man. After years of legal delays, his 'death' was only annulled in 1999 after intervention by the Association of the Dead, an organisation that protests such cases. (See also Lal Bihari.)
- Yuko Yamaguchi, the current character designer for Hello Kitty, was rumored on social media to have died in the 2011 Tōhoku earthquake and tsunami. She was subsequently confirmed to be alive by Sanrio and Yamaguchi herself.
- Shoichi Yokoi: trapped on Guam when U.S. troops recaptured it near the end of World War II, this Japanese soldier lived in a cave in the jungle until 1972, believing that the war had not ended and that leaflets reporting Japan's surrender were enemy propaganda. He had been reported killed in action. On his return home, Yokoi was treated as a national hero for his extreme tenacity and loyalty. However, he felt he had not served the Emperor and army adequately, saying "It is with much embarrassment that I have returned alive"—which instantly became a popular saying in Japan. Yokoi's experiences enabled him to become a television commentator on survival skills. His discovery also prompted a search for other missing Japanese soldiers such as Hiroo Onoda. He died in 1997.

- Mae Young, a professional wrestler, was incorrectly reported dead by TMZ and pro-wrestling news websites on January 9, 2014. She was in fact gravely ill, and she died on January 14, 2014.
- Neil Young, musician, has been the subject of several false death reports:
  - In February 1979, Young's manager Elliot Roberts stated he had twice had to deal with reports of Young's death. "One time his father called me. Said that he'd read in the AP that Neil died and was it true. Another time Warner Brothers called me and said was there any truth to Neil's demise in Paris. Both times they were 'drug accidents.' "Right," says Young. "I was traveling on the highway and was hit by a huge drug truck."
  - In the 1975 comedy LP Goodbye Pop 1952–1976 issued by the National Lampoon, there is a fake obituary for Neil Young in the track "A History of Neil Young", which is, in turn, part of a set of short fake documentary segments, "The History of Rock And Roll." "Poor Neil, dead as a doorknob", the presenter laments, while speculating, "Could it have been a drug overdose?" In closing, the presenter notes that Young's death "...is a great loss to both rock and roll."
  - Upon the death of Neil Armstrong in 2012, NBC News confused the name of the astronaut with Young in the article about his death. The mix-up went unnoticed in the rush to be first to get the news out about Armstrong's death, and was subsequently fixed.
- Alberto Youssef: a convicted money-launderer was falsely reported dead by a hoax that circulated in the social network in the day of the 2014 Brazilian presidential elections. The report accused the ruling Worker's Party of assassinating Youssef to protect the reelection of Dilma Rousseff because of Youssef's plea bargain in the Car-Wash Operation.

== Z ==
- Lotfi A. Zadeh, an Iranian-Azerbaijani mathematician and computer scientist, was incorrectly reported to have died in August 2017. His alma mater, the University of Tehran, wrote an obituary while he was in ill health at the age of 95, and withdrew it. He died on 6 September 2017.
- Louis Zamperini: Zamperini and his colleagues were declared dead in absentia in 1944, a year after their airplane crashed into the Pacific Ocean. Zamperini and two others survived the crash and found their way to the Marshall Islands only to be taken prisoner by Japanese war criminal Mutsuhiro Watanabe. Only after the islands were liberated was Zamperini discovered to be alive. Zamperini lived until 2014.
- Vladimir Zhirinovsky, a Russian politician, was reported to have died from COVID-19 complications on March 25, 2022, by Senator Alexander Pronyushkin. Russian military officials and Chairman of the State Duma Vyacheslav Volodin denied reports of his death. Zhirinovsky died less than two weeks later, on April 6, 2022.

== CNN.com incident ==
Premature obituary of Dick Cheney on CNN.com mistakenly identifying him as the "UK's favorite grandmother"

Multiple premature obituaries came to light on April 16, 2003, when it was discovered that pre-written draft memorials to several world figures were available on the development area of the CNN website without requiring a password (and may have been accessible for some time before). The pages included tributes to Fidel Castro (d. 2016), Dick Cheney (d. 2025), Nelson Mandela (d. 2013), Bob Hope (d. July 2003), Gerald Ford (d. 2006), Pope John Paul II (d. 2005), and Ronald Reagan (d. 2004), all of which claim they died in 2001.

Some of these obituaries contained fragments taken from others, particularly from Queen Elizabeth The Queen Mother's obituary, which had apparently been used as a template. Dick Cheney for example was described as the "UK's favorite grandmother", and Pope John Paul II was noted for his "love of racing". Although the Queen Mother was already dead, in an unrelated incident she had previously received a premature obituary of her own.

== Radio France Internationale incident ==
On November 16, 2020, about 100 draft obituaries were published on the Radio France Internationale website, as well as those of its partner sites including Google News, Yahoo News and MSN. These included Elizabeth II (d. 2022) who supposedly died of coronavirus, footballer Pelé (d. 2022), actors Alain Delon (d. 2024), Clint Eastwood, Brigitte Bardot (d. 2025) and Sophia Loren, politicians Jimmy Carter (d. 2024), Ali Khamenei (d. 2026), Raúl Castro and Lionel Jospin (d. 2026), and French businessman Bernard Tapie (d. 2021), of which this was his third premature obituary. The broadcaster blamed it on a "major bug" while upgrading its website.

== See also ==
- Declared death in absentia
