= Loat =

Loat or LOAT may refer to:

== People ==
- Lily Loat (1880–1958), British anti-vaccination activist
- William Leonard Stevenson Loat (1871–1932), British archaeologist, naturalist, and collector
- Alison Loat (1975–), a Canadian author and executive

== Other ==
- Trausdorf Airport (ICAO: LOAT), a former public airstrip in Trausdorf an der Wulka, Burgenland, Austria

== See also ==
- David Loats (born 1981), former Australian rules footballer
