= National Anti-Vaccination League =

British anti-vaccine organization

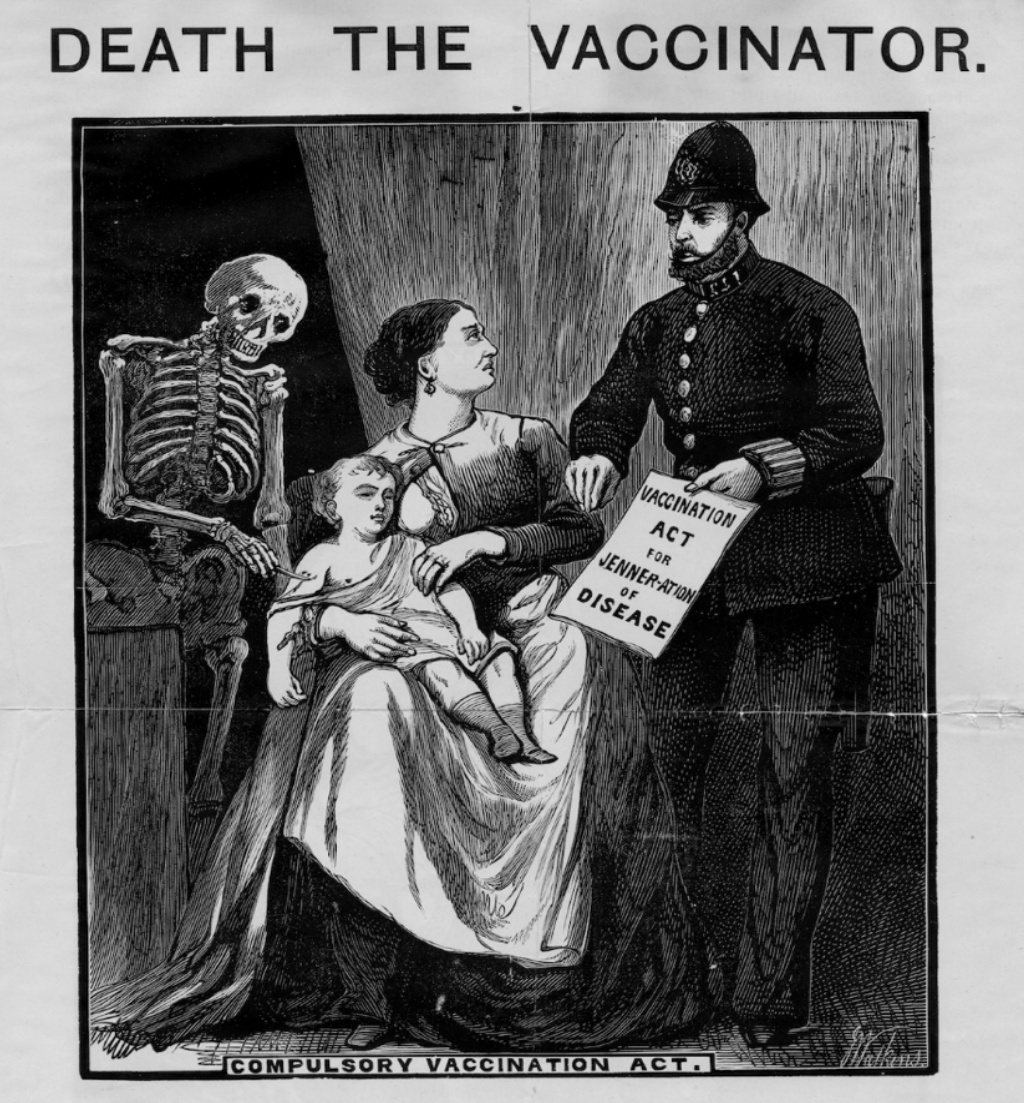
"Death the Vaccinator", published by the London Society for the Abolition of Compulsory Vaccination in the late 1800s

The National Anti-Vaccination League (NAVL) was a British anti-vaccination organization that was formed in 1896 from earlier smaller organizations. Historically, the League had opposed compulsory vaccination, particularly against smallpox. It was part of a wider anti-vaccinationist movement, arguing that vaccination did more harm than good.

== History ==
=== Anti-Compulsory Vaccination League ===
The National Anti-Vaccination League grew from earlier smaller organizations in London, originally under the title Anti-Compulsory Vaccination League (ACVL) in response to the government making smallpox vaccination compulsory. The Anti-Compulsory Vaccination League was founded by Richard Butler Gibbs at Finsbury in 1866. Members included Richard's brother George Sleight Gibbs and his cousin John Gibbs, author of the first anti-vaccination pamphlet. The Anti-Compulsory Vaccination League had 103 branch leagues and claimed 10,000 members in 1871.

In June 1867, the publication "Human Nature" campaigned against "The Vaccination Humbug". It reported that many petitions had been presented to Parliament against Compulsory Vaccination, and many from parents who alleged that their children had died through the operation, and complained that these petitions had not been made public. The journal reported the formation of the Anti-Compulsory Vaccination League "To overthrow this huge piece of physiological absurdity and medical tyranny, and quoted Richard Gibbs, who ran the Free Hospital at the same address as stating "I believe we have hundreds of cases here, from being poisoned with vaccination, I deem incurable. One member of a family dating syphilitic symptoms from the time of vaccination, when all the other members of the family have been clear. We strongly advise parents to go to prison, rather than submit to have their helpless offspring inoculated with scrofula, syphilis, and mania."

Notable members of the Anti-Compulsory Vaccination League were James Burns, George Dornbusch and Charles Thomas Pearce.

After the death of Richard B. Gibbs in 1871, the Anti-Compulsory Vaccination League underwent various changes until 1876 when it was revived under the leadership of Mary Hume-Rothery and the Rev. W. Hume-Rothery. The Anti-Compulsory Vaccination League published the Occasional Circular which later merged into the National Anti-Compulsory Vaccination Reporter.

=== London Society for the Abolition of Compulsory Vaccination ===
In 1880, William Tebb enlarged and reorganized the League with the formation of the London Society for the Abolition of Compulsory Vaccination, with William Young as secretary. The Vaccination Inquirer, established by Tebb in 1879, was adopted as the official organ of the Society. A series of fourteen "Vaccination Tracts" was begun by Young in 1877 and completed by Garth Wilkinson in 1879. William White was the first editor of the Vaccination Inquirer and after his death in 1885, he was succeeded by Alfred Milnes. Frances Hoggan and her husband authored an article for the Vaccination Inquirer in September 1883 which argued against compulsory vaccination.

The London Society focused on lobbying parliamentary support in the 1880s and early 1890s. They gained support from several members of the House of Commons of which the most prominent was Peter Alfred Taylor who was described as the "Mecca of antivaccination".

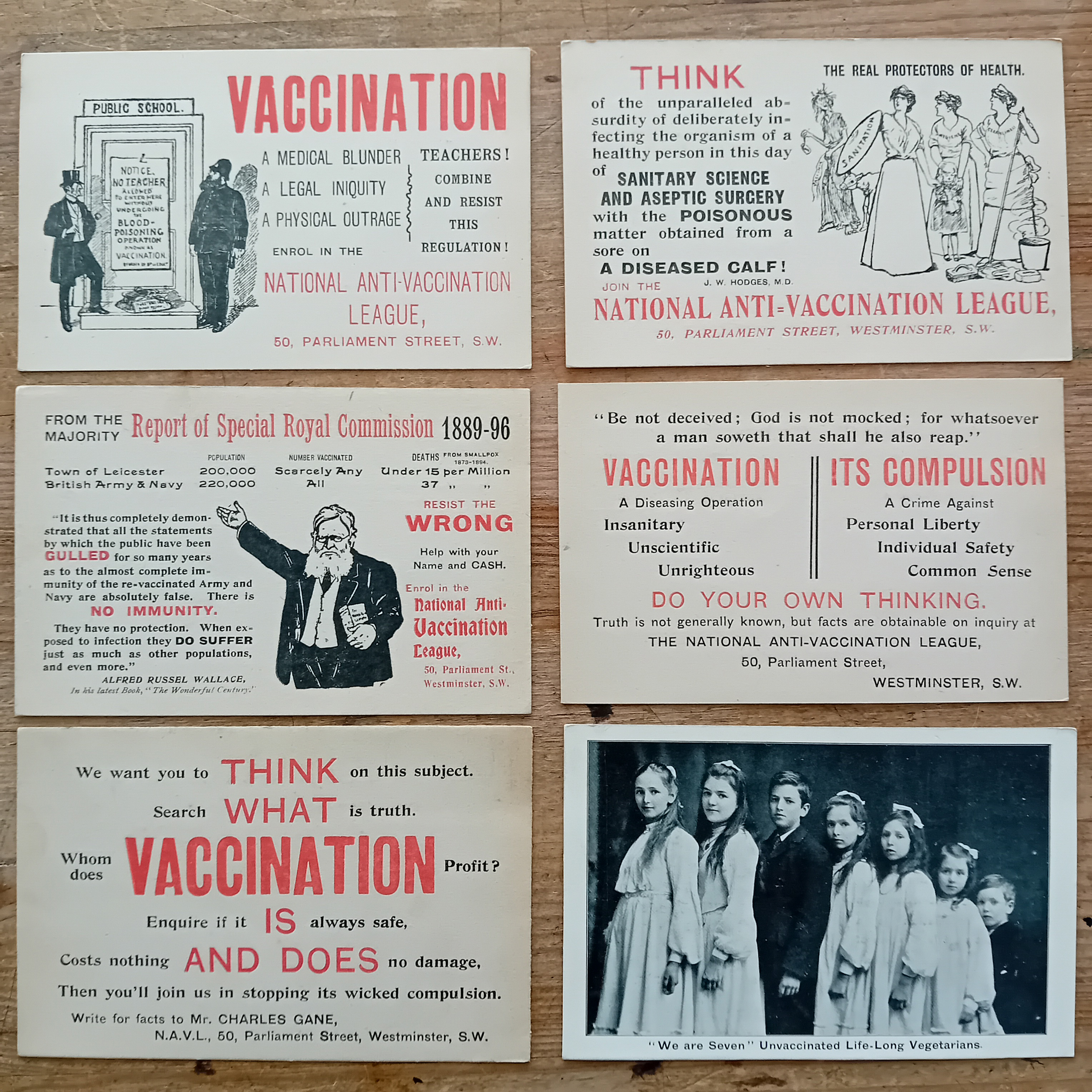
1896 National Anti-Vaccination league postcards

=== National Anti-Vaccination League ===
The movement grew, and as the influence of the London Society overshadowed the Hume-Rotherys and it took the national lead, it was decided in February 1896 to re-form the Society as The National Anti-Vaccination League. Arthur Phelps was elected as president. In 1898, the league took on a school leaver named Lily Loat. By 1909 she was elected as the league's Secretary.

In 1906, George Bernard Shaw wrote a supportive letter to the National Anti-Vaccination League, equating methods of vaccination with "rubbing the contents of the dustpan into the wound".

Lily Loat devoted her life to the cause and died still working for the league in 1958. The league's journal ceased to create new issues in 1972.

== Publications of The National Anti-Vaccination League ==
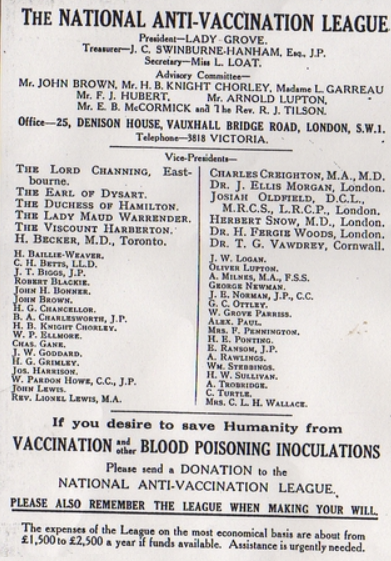
National Anti-Vaccination League board of members 1921

- 1901, An Italian Indictment of Vaccination., Carlo Ruata. Public address given at the opening of the session of the University of Perugia, November, 1898. Translated from the Italian. National Anti-Vaccination League: London.
- 1901, Vaccination a Delusion, Alfred Russel Wallace. Chapter 28 of The Wonderful Century
- 1902, Smallpox at Gloucester. A reply to Dr. Coupland's Report by Walter Hadwen. Reprinted from “The Reformer,” National Anti-Vaccination League: Gloucester
- 1902, Smallpox at Middlesbrough. A reply to Dr. Dingle's Reports ... 2nd edition, rev. by Biggs, John Thomas pp. 24.
- 1902, What about Vaccination, Milnes, Alfred. With other contributions. (When Doctors Disagree. The Wreck of the Preussen. Vaccination an Error.) National Anti-Vaccination League: Westminster.
- 1904, The Story of the Vaccination Crusade in Hackney & Stoke Newington, 1902–1904, and what came of it. The cases of John Polley, William Pitt, and others, with an account of the action-at-law Polley v. Fordham., Burton, John Francis. Hackney Union Branch of the National Anti-Vaccination League: London.
- 1910, For and Against Vaccination A statement by the Royal College of Physicians, Ireland; (with correspondence thereon, between A. Phelps and T. Percy C. Kirkpatrick).
- 1911, Smallpox and vaccination in British India.
- 1912, Leicester: Sanitation Versus Vaccination, J. T. Biggs, JP. Book.
- 1921, Vaccination and the State, Arnold Lupton MP.
- 1929, National Anti-Vaccination League (London) Thirty-third [etc.] Annual Report, etc.
- 1936, The Case Against Vaccination, Maurice Beddow Bayly.
- 1939, The Schick Inoculation Against Diphtheria, Maurice Beddow Bayly
- 1947, Smallpox and Vaccination., Trolridge, Arthur.
- 1952, B.C.G. Vaccination, Maurice Beddow Bayly.
- 1957, Is Mass Vaccination with B.C.G. always warranted in the Scandinavian Countries? (booklet).
