= Horsell (surname) =

English toponymic surname

Horsell is an English toponymic surname originating from either Horsehall in Little Bedwyn, Wiltshire, or Horsell, Surrey.

Notable people with the surname include:

- Albert Horsell (1909–1982), Australian rugby league footballer
- Elizabeth Horsell (baptised 1798, died 1874), English social reformer and writer
- Jack Horsell (1914–1985), Australian cricketer
- Martin Horsell (born 1986), English footballer
- William Horsell (1807–1863), English social reformer and publisher
