= 100th Guards Fighter Aviation Regiment =

45th Fighter Aviation Regiment (1938–1943); 100th Guards Mixed Aviation Regiment (1943–1949); 789th Fighter Aviation Regiment (1949–1960)
- Active: 1938–1960
- Country: Soviet Union
- Branch: Soviet Air Forces; Soviet Naval Aviation
- Type: Aviation regiment
- Engagements: World War II
- Decorations: Order of Bogdan Khmelnitsky 2nd class; Order of Alexander Nevsky
- Honorifics: Chenstokhov

The 100th Guards Fighter Aviation Regiment (Russian: 100-й гвардейский истребительный авиационный полк) as a fighter regiment (IAP) of the Soviet Air Force during World War II and the early years of the Cold War.

It was formed as the 45th Fighter Aviation Regiment in 1938 and served in the Transcaucasian Military District, participating in the Anglo-Soviet invasion of Iran. Sent to Crimea to fight in the Battle of the Kerch Peninsula, it suffered heavy losses.

== Prewar ==
The 45th Fighter Aviation Regiment was formed on 1 April 1938 at Baku in the Transcaucasian Military District from the 120th Separate Fighter Aviation Squadron. The latter was formed between 10 July and 19 August 1932 in Baku as the 14th Fighter Aviation Squadron, and redesignated the 120th Separate Fighter Aviation Squadron in March 1933. The regiment was equipped with Polikarpov I-16 and I-15bis fighters, and formed part of the 60th Aviation Brigade of the Air Forces (VVS) of the Transcaucasian Military District. Major Ibrahim Dzusov, later promoted to lieutenant colonel, commanded the regiment from 25 April 1939. It was re-equipped with more modern Yakovlev Yak-1 fighters in May 1941, and after the beginning of Operation Barbarossa, the German invasion of the Soviet Union, in June, the regiment was reorganized to a structure that included three aviation squadrons and a total of 32 combat aircraft from its prewar structure of four squadrons with 63 combat aircraft as combat losses reduced the size of fighter regiments.

== World War II ==
With the VVS of the district, the 45th IAP participated in the Anglo-Soviet invasion of Iran from 25 August and remained as part of the Soviet occupation forces in northern Iran until 22 October. Returning from Iran later that month, it became part of the 8th Fighter Aviation Corps (IAK) of the Air Defense Forces. The regiment was transferred to the front on 9 January 1942 and on the next day entered combat over Crimea as part of the 72nd Fighter Aviation Division (IAD) of the VVS Crimean Front. Lieutenant Vasily Sharenko was credited with the regiment's first known victory on 29 January when he claimed a Heinkel He 111 bomber in an air battle over Bagerovo. With the 72nd IAD, the regiment flew 1,087 sorties with the loss of 27 aircraft and 6 pilots. Following the destruction of the Crimean Front, the regiment was transferred to the 236th IAD of the VVS North Caucasian Front on 12 May, with which it flew 109 sorties without loss.

As a result of its losses in Crimea, the regiment received nine pilots and twelve Yak-1s from the 237th IAP, and left the front for rebuilding. From 10 June, the regiment was operationally controlled by the commander of the Sevastopol Defense Region of the VVS Black Sea Fleet during the Siege of Sevastopol. During the siege, the regiment flew 168 sorties, losing eight aircraft and two pilots. During the month, the regiment was reorganized to include two squadrons with a total of twenty aircraft. As Sevastopol fell, the regiment was returned to the 236th IAD on 28 June, now part of the 5th Air Army of the North Caucasian Front, with which it flew sixty sorties without loss. The regiment was transferred to the 230th Assault Aviation Division of the 4th Air Army of the Southern Front on 11 July and to the 216th IAD of the same air army (now part of the Northern Group of Forces of the Transcaucasian Front) on 26 July. The regiment flew 274 sorties and lost three aircraft with the 230th, while it flew 756 sorties with the loss of eleven aircraft and four pilots with the 216th IAD.

The regiment was pulled out of combat and sent to the 25th Reserve IAP at Adzhikabul on 20 September for rebuilding. It was reorganized there in December to include three squadrons with a total of 32 combat aircraft, and retrained on the American Lend-Lease P-39 Airacobra and P-40 Kittyhawk fighters until 20 February. Two squadrons received the Airacobra and the remaining squadron the Kittyhawk. The 45th reentered combat on 26 February as part of the 216th Mixed Aviation Division (the former 216th IAD), still part of the 4th Air Army of the North Caucasian Front. It operationally used the Kittyhawks during March and April and in August handed them over to PVO units. Dzusov was promoted to command the 216th Division on 17 May and replaced by Major Borey Sayfutdinov. For its "exemplary performance of combat missions and demonstrated courage and heroism", the regiment became the 100th Guards Fighter Aviation Regiment (GIAP), an elite Guards unit, on 17 June. At the same time, the 216th became the 9th Guards IAD (GIAD), which the regiment served with for the rest of the war. With the North Caucasian Front, the regiment flew 1,010 sorties with the loss of sixteen aircraft and twelve pilots.

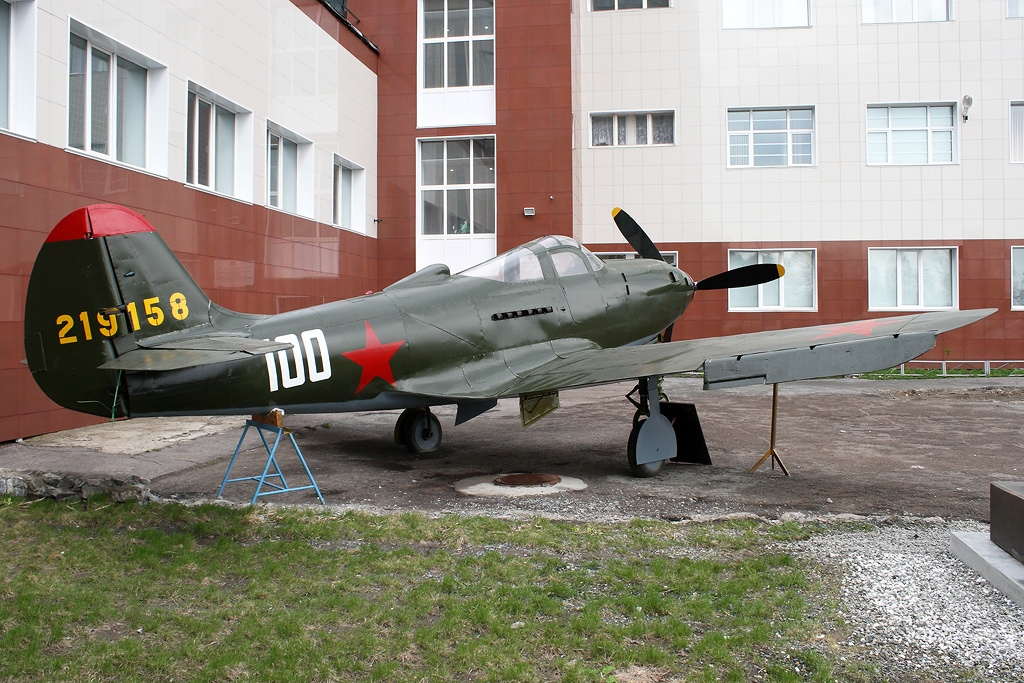
Airacobra of the type flown by the regiment during the later years of World War II

With the 9th GIAD, the regiment transferred to the 8th Air Army on 1 August and flew combat missions with it as part of the Southern Front (the 4th Ukrainian Front from 20 October). With the division, the 100th GIAP was operationally subordinated to the 17th Air Army of the Southwestern Front between 15 and 21 August and relocated to the 17th Air Army area of operations. Sayfutdinov was replaced by Major Sergey Lukyanov on 2 October; Lukyanov commanded the regiment for the rest of the war, and was promoted to lieutenant colonel and made a Hero of the Soviet Union. With the Southern and 4th Ukrainian Fronts, the regiment flew 2,153 sorties with the loss of 21 aircraft and eleven pilots. The regiment and its division were withdrawn to the Reserve of the Supreme High Command (RVGK) on 11 January 1944 to receive replacement personnel and aircraft. While in reserve, the regiment was reorganized to include three squadrons with a total of forty combat aircraft.

The 100th GIAP and its division returned to the front on 7 May, part of the 5th Air Army of the 2nd Ukrainian Front although operationally subordinated to the 7th IAK of the RVGK. With the 2nd Ukrainian Front, the 100th GIAP flew 476 sorties with the loss of nine aircraft and seven pilots. The regiment and its division were transferred as part of the 7th IAK to the 8th Air Army, now part of the 1st Ukrainian Front, on 8 July. With the corps and its division, the regiment was shifted to the 2nd Air Army of the front on 31 July, and on 27 October the corps became the 6th Guards IAK of the RVGK. For its contribution to the capture of Częstochowa, Przedbórz, and Radom during the Sandomierz–Silesian Offensive, the regiment was awarded the name of Chenstokhov (the Russian name of Częstochowa) as an honorific on 19 February 1945. With the 1st Ukrainian Front, the 100th GIAP flew 2,130 sorties with the loss of nine aircraft and three pilots. Ending the war with the 9th GIAD on 11 May, the regiment received the Order of Alexander Nevsky on 26 May for its "exemplary performance of combat missions and demonstrated courage and heroism" in the breakthrough on the Neisse and the capture of Cottbus, Lübben, Zossen, Beelitz, Luckenwalde, Treuenbrietzen, Zahna, Marienfelde, Trebbin, Rangsdorf, Dietersdorf, and Keltow. On 4 June it was further decorated with the Order of Bogdan Khmelnitsky, 2nd class, for its actions in the elimination of the Halbe pocket.

The regiment flew 2,454 sorties in 1942, 3,158 in 1943, 1,300 in 1944, and 1,311 in 1945. It reported the destruction of a hundred aircraft in 1942, 211 in 1943, 95 in 1944, and 41 in 1945. The regiment lost 49 aircraft on operations in 1942, 37 in 1943, sixteen in 1944, and two in 1945. In addition, eighteen aircraft were lost for non-operational reasons. Of the lost aircraft, fifty were Yak-1s, two were Kittyhawks, and seventy were Airacobras. Of 61 pilots lost during the war to all causes, most were in 1942 and 1943.

== Postwar ==
Between May and June 1945, the regiment was based at Riesa-Canitz airfield with the division. The regiment relocated with the 6th GIAK to Austria on 7 June, joining the 2nd Air Army as part of the Central Group of Forces; it was based at Absdorf-Eisenstadt airfield. While in Austria, the regiment was re-equipped with the P-63 Kingcobra in 1946. The 100th GIAP was renumbered as the 789th, its division as the 237th GIAD, and the 2nd Air Army as the 59th Air Army on 10 January 1949 when the Soviet Air Force renumbered its units. At the time, it was based at Trausdorf. It was retrained on the Mikoyan-Gurevich MiG-15 jet fighter between March and December 1951.

With the division, it was relocated from Austria to Kaliningrad Oblast, where it became part of Soviet Naval Aviation in October 1952. The division was assigned to the VVS of the 4th Fleet on 25 April 1953, and in 1956 joined the VVS of the reunified Baltic Fleet. The 789th GIAP was relocated with its division to Murmansk Oblast in March 1958, where it became part of the VVS of the Northern Fleet. It was disbanded in mid-1960 during reductions of fighter units.
