= Arthur Phelps =

British General, civil engineer, homeopath and activist (1837–1920)

Lieutenant-General Arthur Phelps
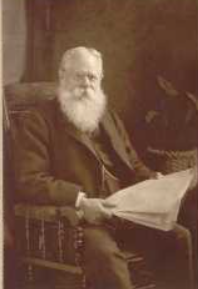
- Born: 24 October 1837; Funchal, Madiera
- Died: 4 October 1920 (aged 82); Edgbaston, Birmingham, England
- Occupations: General, civil engineer, homeopath, activist
- Spouse: Caroline Ann Peyton (m. 1868)
- Children: 4

Lieutenant-General Arthur Phelps (24 October 1837 – 4 October 1920) was a Portuguese-born British General in the British Indian Army, civil engineer, homeopath and anti-vaccination activist.

== Biography ==
Phelps was born in Funchal, Madeira. He was educated at The Market Bosworth School and later joined the British Indian Army, at Woolwich. He was posted to the 11th Bombay Native Infantry in 1853 and qualified as a surveyor in 1855. He studied at Poonah Military College and qualified as a civil engineer.

Phelps joined the Commissariat in 1858 was in charge of the commissariat branch of the Jaulna Field Force. He joined the Kattiwar Field Force and worked as commissariat officer at Bombay. During the Afghan War in 1878 he was appointed executive commissariat officer. In 1889, he was promoted to Commissary-General.

Phelps returned to England in 1886 after having attained the rank of Colonel. He was made Major-General in 1888, and Lieutenant-General in 1893. He toured India and developed a strong interest in homeopathy. He later became chairman of the committee of the Homeopathic Hospital in Birmingham.

Phelps married Caroline Ann Peyton in 1868, they had four children. Phelps was a vegetarian. He was a member of the London Association for the Prevention of Premature Burial.

Phelps died at his home in Edgbaston on 4 October 1920.

== Anti-vaccination ==
Phelps was drawn to the anti-vaccination movement and became a leading anti-vaccinationist. He lectured throughout the United Kingdom. Phelps was elected President of the National Anti-Vaccination League in 1887. He was also an anti-vivisectionist.

In 1897, Phelps described public vaccinators as "grasping vampires" who operate on people for "blood money". In 1910, Phelps debated Percy Kirkpatrick on vaccination. Phelps argued against vaccines, stating that sanitation was the only remedy for smallpox and other diseases. Phelps was the editor and owner of the Citizen newspaper which published anti-vaccination material.

== Selected publications ==
- The Psychology of Antivaccination (The British Medical Journal, 1901)
- The Imperial Vaccination League (The British Medical Journal, 1902)
