= Anti-vaccine activism =

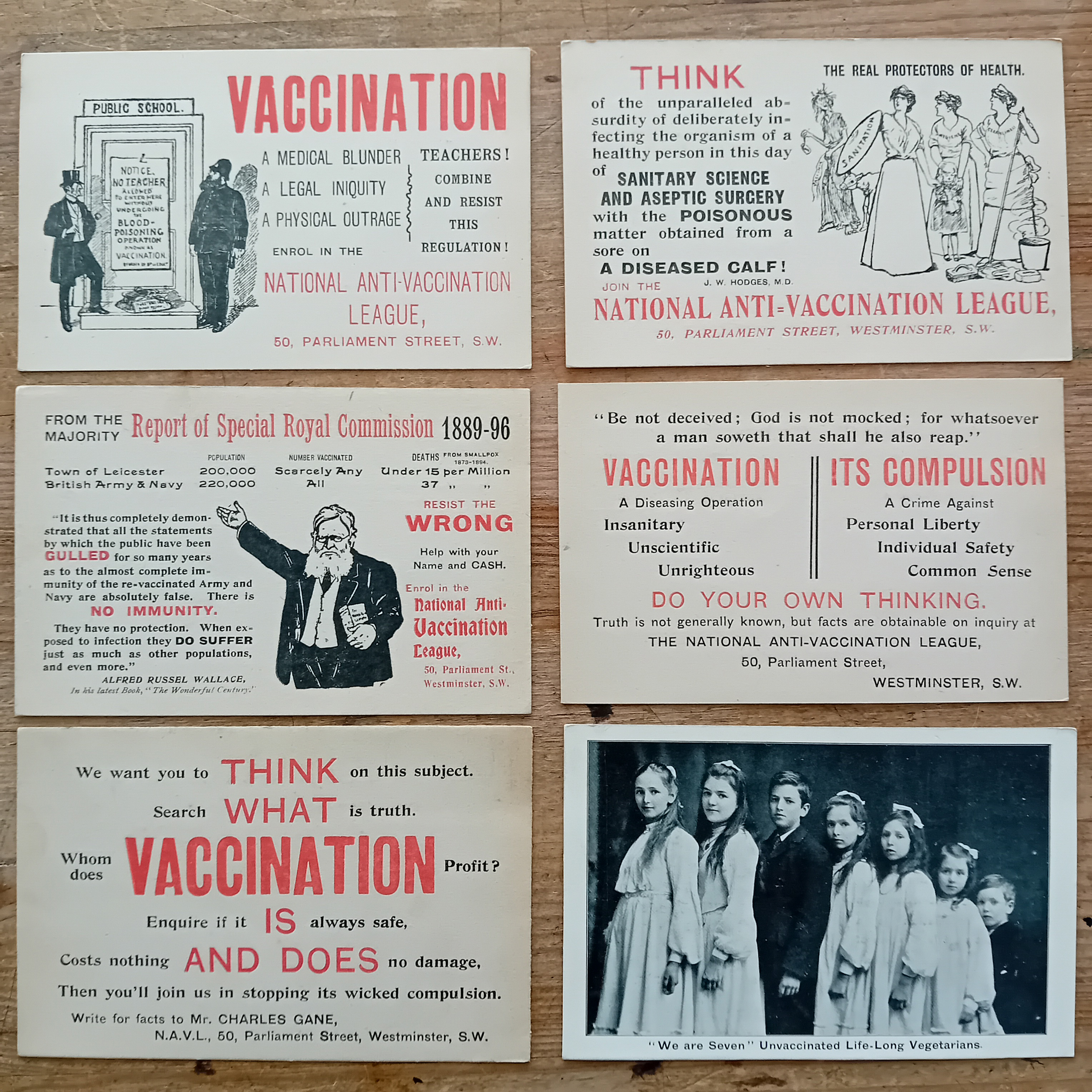
Postcards for the National Anti-Vaccination League

Anti-vaccine activism, which collectively constitutes the "anti-vax" or "anti-vaxx" movement, is a set of organized activities expressing opposition to vaccination. These collaborating networks often seek to increase vaccine hesitancy by disseminating vaccine misinformation and disinformation. As a social movement, it employs tools ranging from traditional news media to various forms of online communication. Activists have primarily—though not exclusively—focused on opposing childhood vaccination, and have sought to expand their influence from niche subgroups into national political debates.

Ideas that later coalesced into anti-vaccine activism predate vaccines themselves. The movement, along with fringe doctors, has propagated various myths and conspiracy theories, alongside misinformation and disinformation. These efforts have significantly increased vaccine hesitancy and influenced public policy regarding the ethical, legal, and medical aspects of vaccination. In contrast, there is no substantive debate or hesitancy within mainstream medical circles about the benefits of vaccination; the scientific consensus is "clear and unambiguous" in favor of vaccines. Despite this consensus, the anti-vaccine movement has been partially successful in distorting the public understanding of science in popular culture.

== History ==
=== 18th and 19th century ===
Ideas that would eventually coalesce into anti-vaccine activism have existed for longer than vaccines themselves. Some philosophical approaches (e.g. homeopathy, vitalism) are incompatible with the microbiological paradigm that explains how the immune system and vaccines work. Vaccine hesitancy and anti-vaccine activism exist within a broader context that involves cultural tradition, religious belief, approaches to health and disease, and political affiliation.

Opposition to variolation for smallpox (a predecessor to vaccination) was organized as early as the 1720s around the premise that vaccination was unnatural and an attempt to thwart divine judgment. Religious arguments against inoculation, the earliest arguments against vaccination, were soon advanced. For example, in a 1722 sermon entitled "The Dangerous and Sinful Practice of Inoculation", the English theologian Reverend Edmund Massey argued that diseases are sent by God to punish sin and that any attempt to prevent smallpox via inoculation is a "diabolical operation". It was customary at the time for popular preachers to publish sermons, which reached a wide audience. This was the case with Massey, whose sermon reached North America, where there was early religious opposition, particularly by John Williams. A greater source of opposition there was William Douglass, a medical graduate of Edinburgh University and a Fellow of the Royal Society, who had settled in Boston.

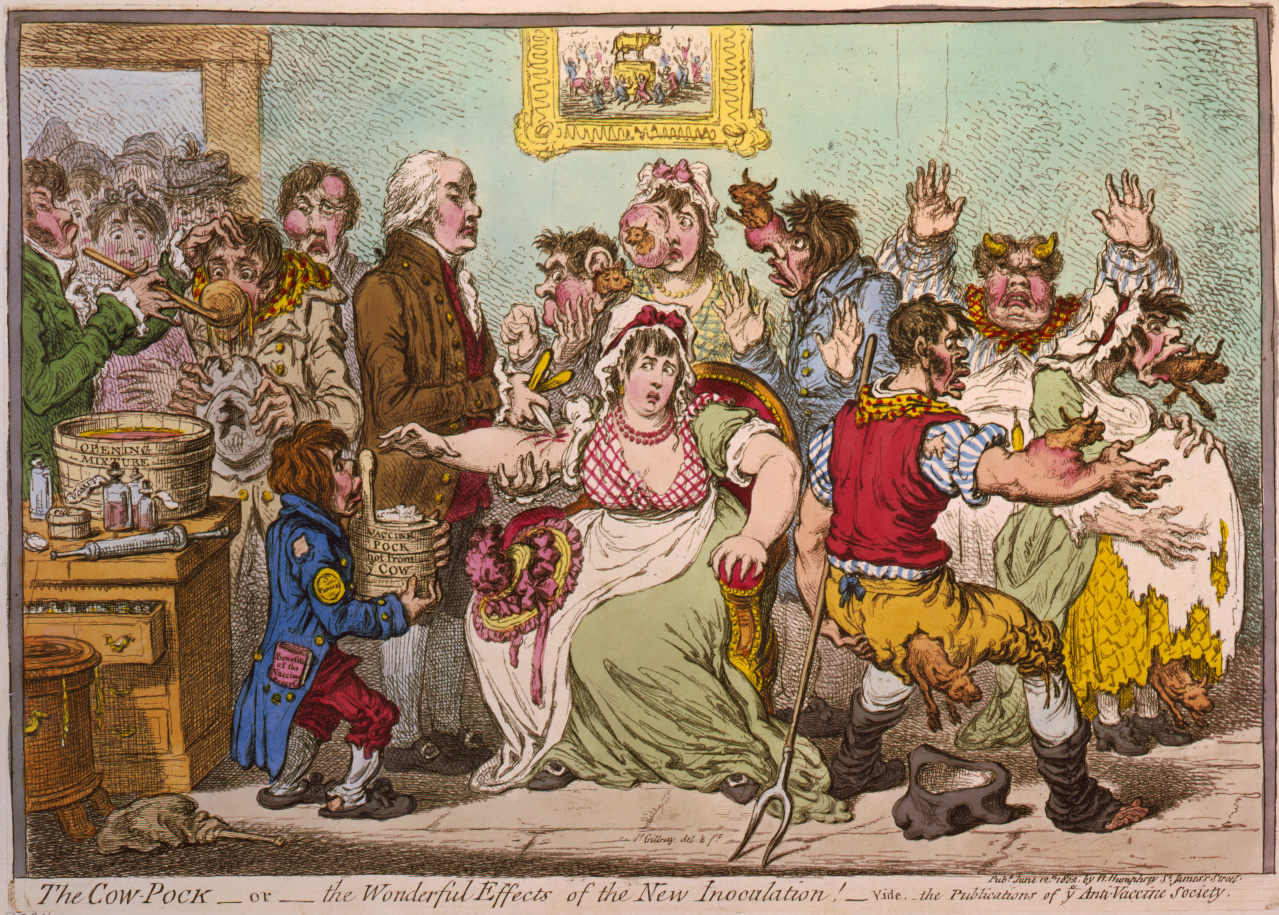
James Gillray's 1802 caricature of Edward Jenner vaccinating patients who feared it would make them sprout cowlike appendages.

Vaccination itself was invented by British physician Edward Jenner, who published his findings on the efficacy of the practice for smallpox in 1798. By 1801, the practice had been widely endorsed in the scientific community and by several world leaders. Philadelphia physician John Redman Coxe, noting that even then false accounts were circulated of negative effects of vaccination, wrote,

"Such are the falsehoods which impede the progress of the brightest discovery which has ever been made! But the contest is in vain! Time has drawn aside the veil which obstructed our knowledge of this invaluable blessing; and in the examples of the Emperor of Constantinople, of the Dowager Empress of Russia, and the King of Spain, we may date the downfall of further opposition."

Coxe's expectation of an end to opposition to vaccination proved premature, and through much of the nineteenth century, the principles, practices and impact of vaccination were matters of active scientific debate. The principles behind vaccination were not clearly understood until the end of the nineteenth century. The importance of hygiene in the preparation, storage, and administration of vaccines was not always understood or practiced. Reliable statistics on vaccine efficacy and side effects were difficult to obtain before the 1930s.

==== Anti-Compulsory Vaccination League ====
In the United Kingdom, the Vaccination Act 1853 (16 & 17 Vict. c. 100) required that every child be vaccinated within three or four months of birth. It set a precedent for the state regulation of physical bodies, and was fiercely resisted. The following year, in 1854, John Gibbs published the first anti-compulsory-vaccination pamphlet, Our Medical Liberties. By the 1860s, anti-vaccinationism in Britain was active in the working class, labor aristocracy, and lower middle class. It had become associated with alternative medicine and was part of a larger culture of social and political dissent that included both labor unions and religious dissenters.

In June 1867, the publication "Human Nature" campaigned in the United Kingdom against "The Vaccination Humbug", reporting that many petitions had been presented to Parliament against Compulsory Vaccination for smallpox, including from parents who alleged that their children had died through the procedure, and complaining that these petitions had not been made public. The journal reported the formation of the Anti-Compulsory Vaccination League "To overthrow this huge piece of physiological absurdity and medical tyranny", and quoted Richard Gibbs (a cousin of John Gibbs), who ran the Free Hospital at the same address, as stating "I believe we have hundreds of cases here, from being poisoned with vaccination, I deem incurable. One member of a family dating syphilitic symptoms from the time of vaccination, when all the other members of the family have been clear. We strongly advise parents to go to prison, rather than submit to have their helpless offspring inoculated with scrofula, syphilis, and mania".

Notable members of the Anti-Compulsory Vaccination League included James Burns, George Dornbusch and Charles Thomas Pearce. After the death of Richard B. Gibbs in 1871, the Anti-Compulsory Vaccination League "languished" until 1876 when it was revived under the leadership of Mary Hume-Rothery and the Rev. W. Hume-Rothery. The Anti-Compulsory Vaccination League published the Occasional Circular which later merged into the National Anti-Compulsory Vaccination Reporter.

==== Anti-Vaccination Society of America ====
In the United States, many states and local school boards established immunization requirements, beginning with a compulsory school vaccination law in Massachusetts in 1855. The Anti-Vaccination Society of America was founded in 1879, after a visit to the United States by British anti-vaccine activist William Tebb, and opposed compulsory smallpox vaccination for smallpox from the final decades of the 19th century through the 1910s. During this period, smallpox vaccination was the only form of vaccination that was widely practiced, and the society published a periodical opposing it, called Vaccination.

A series of American legal cases, beginning in various states and culminating with that of Henning Jacobson of Massachusetts in 1905, upheld the mandating of compulsory smallpox vaccination for the good of the public. The court ruled in Jacobson v. Massachusetts that "the liberty secured by the Constitution of the United States to every person within its jurisdiction does not import an absolute right in each person to be, at all times and in all circumstances, wholly freed from restraint. There are manifold restraints to which every person is necessarily subject for the common good".

==== London Society for the Abolition of Compulsory Vaccination ====
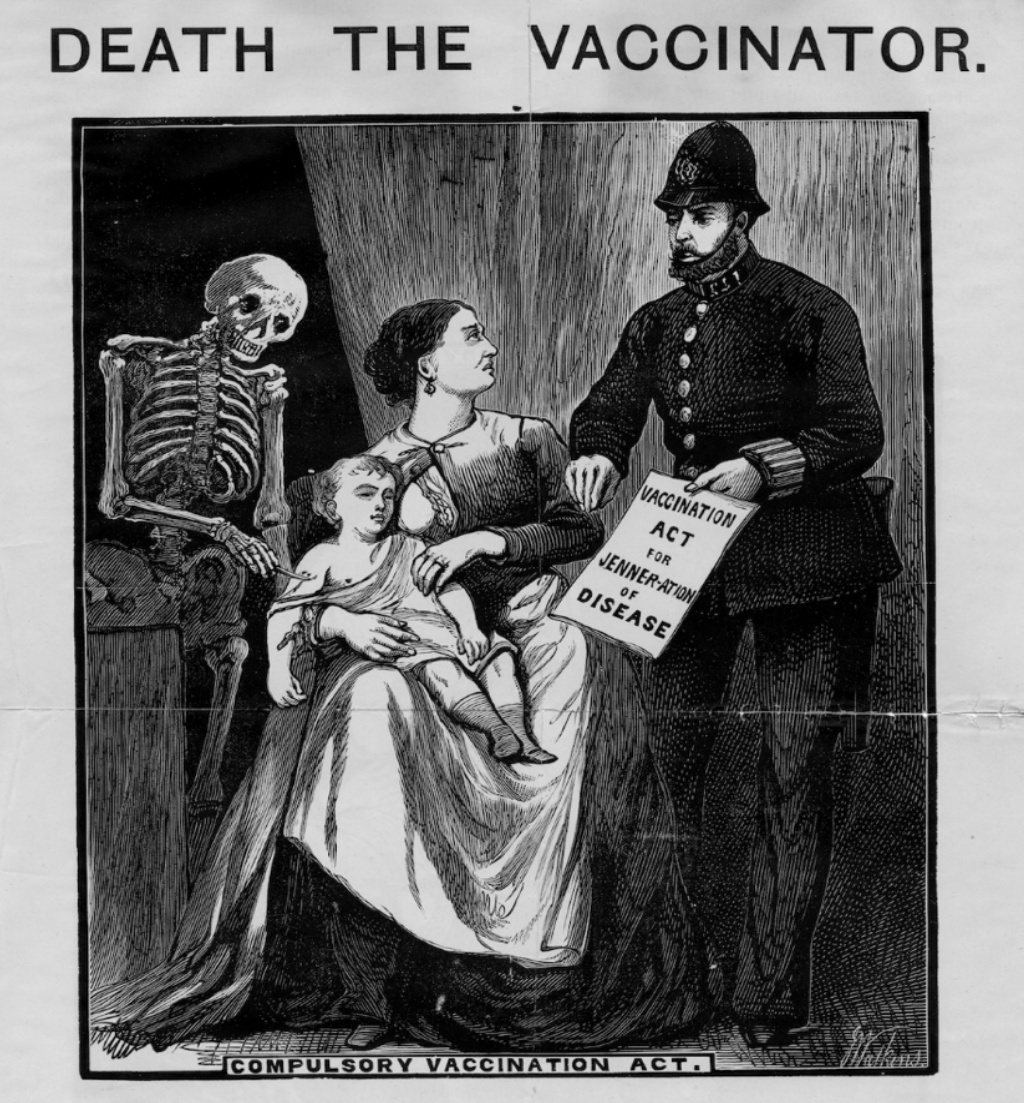
"Death the Vaccinator", published by the London Society for the Abolition of Compulsory Vaccination in the late 1800s

In 1880, William Tebb enlarged and reorganized the Anti-Compulsory Vaccination League in the UK with the formation of the London Society for the Abolition of Compulsory Vaccination, with William Young as secretary. The Vaccination Inquirer, established by Tebb in 1879, was adopted as the official organ of the Society. A series of fourteen "Vaccination Tracts" was begun by Young in 1877 and completed by Garth Wilkinson in 1879. William White was the first editor of the Vaccination Inquirer and after his death in 1885, he was succeeded by Alfred Milnes. Frances Hoggan and her husband authored an article for the Vaccination Inquirer in September 1883 which argued against compulsory vaccination. The London Society focused on lobbying parliamentary support in the 1880s and early 1890s. They gained support from several members of the House of Commons of which the most prominent was Peter Alfred Taylor, the member for Leicester, which was described as the "Mecca of antivaccination".

==== The National Anti-Vaccination League ====
The UK movement grew, and as the influence of the London Society overshadowed the Hume-Rotherys and it took the national lead, it was decided in February 1896 to re-form the Society as The National Anti-Vaccination League. Arthur Phelps was elected as president. In 1898, the league took on a school leaver named Lily Loat, who was elected as the league's Secretary by 1909. In 1906, George Bernard Shaw wrote a supportive letter to the National Anti-Vaccination League, equating methods of vaccination with "rubbing the contents of the dustpan into the wound".

==== Anti-Vaccination League of America ====
In 1908, the Anti-Vaccination League of America was created by Charles M. Higgins and industrialist John Pitcairn Jr., with anti-vaccination campaigns focused on New York and Pennsylvania. Members were opposed to compulsory vaccination laws. Higgins was the League's chief spokesman and pamphleteer. Historian James Colgrove noted that Higgins "attempted to overturn the New York State's law mandating vaccination of students in public schools". The League should not be confused with the Anti-Vaccination Society of America, which was formed in 1879. Higgins was criticized by medical experts for spreading misinformation and ignoring facts as to the efficacy of vaccination. The League dissolved after the death of Higgins in 1929.

=== 20th century ===
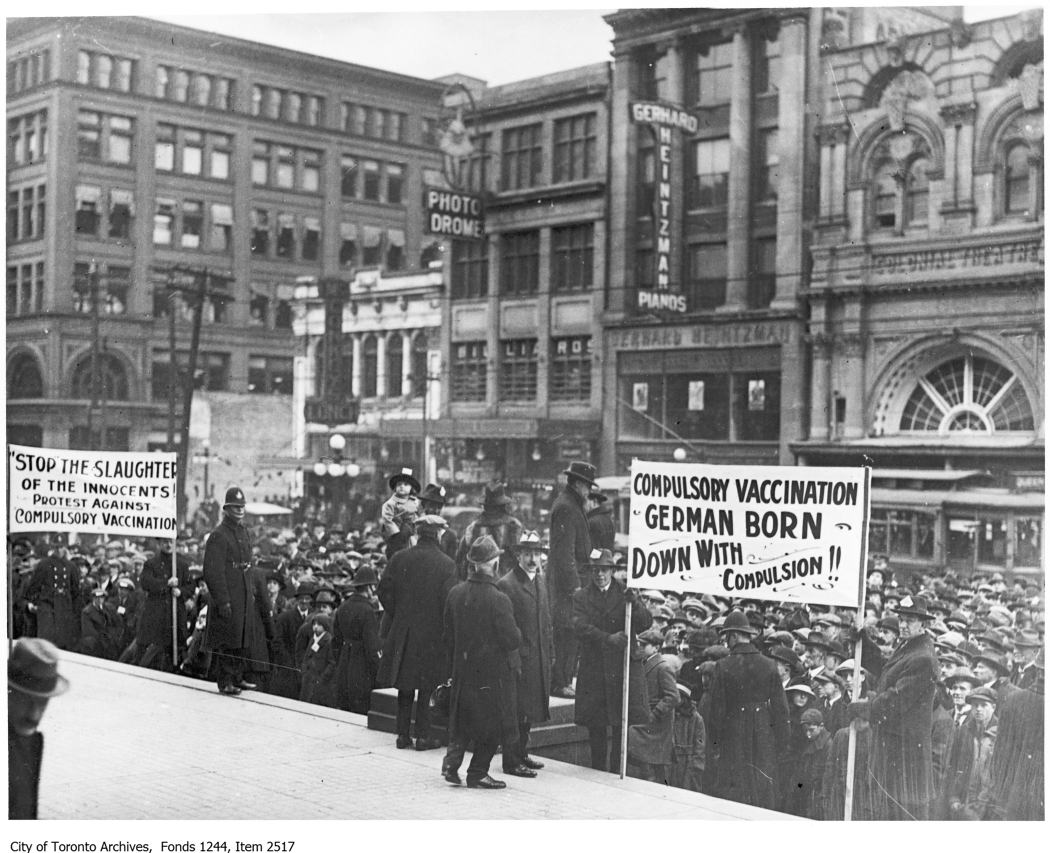
Rally of the Anti-Vaccination League of Canada in 1919

Anti-vaccine activism ebbed for much of the twentieth century, but never completely vanished. In the UK, the National Anti-Vaccination League continued to publish new issues of its journal until 1972, by which time the global campaign for smallpox eradication through vaccination had made the disease so uncommon that compulsory vaccination for smallpox was no longer required in the United Kingdom.

New vaccines were developed and used against diseases such as diphtheria and whooping cough. In the UK, these were often introduced on a voluntary basis, without arousing the same kind of anti-vaccination response that had accompanied compulsory smallpox vaccination.

In the United States, numerous measles outbreaks occurred in the 1960s and 1970s and were more frequent in states that lacked mandatory vaccination requirements. This led to calls in the 1970s for a national-level vaccination requirement for children entering schools. Joseph A. Califano Jr. appealed to state governors, and by 1980, all 50 states legally required vaccination for school entrance. Many of these laws allowed exemptions in response to lobbyists. In New York State, a 1967 law allowed exemptions from receiving polio vaccine for members of religious organizations such as Christian Scientists.

=== 21st century ===
==== Lancet MMR autism fraud ====
Anti-vaccine activism in the 2000s regained prominence through exploratory research by Andrew Wakefield based on 12 selected cases. He then made claims about a link between the MMR vaccine and autism. These claims were subsequently extensively investigated and found to be false, and the original study turned out to be based on faked data. The scientific consensus is that there is no link between the MMR vaccine and autism, and that the MMR vaccine's benefits in preventing measles, mumps, and rubella greatly outweigh its potential risks.

The idea of an autism link was first suggested in the early 1990s and came to public notice largely as a result of the 1998 Lancet MMR autism fraud, which Dennis K Flaherty at the University of Charleston characterized as "perhaps the most damaging medical hoax of the last 100 years". The fraudulent research paper authored by Wakefield and published in The Lancet falsely claimed the vaccine was linked to colitis and autism spectrum disorders. The paper was retracted by Lancet in 2010 but is still cited by anti-vaccine activists.

The claims in the paper were widely reported, leading to a sharp drop in vaccination rates in the UK and Ireland. Promotion of the claimed link, which continued in anti-vaccination propaganda for the next three decades despite being refuted, was estimated to have led to an increase in the incidence of measles and mumps, resulting in deaths and serious permanent injuries. Following the initial claims in 1998, multiple large epidemiological studies were undertaken. Reviews of the evidence by the Centers for Disease Control and Prevention, the American Academy of Pediatrics, the Institute of Medicine of the US National Academy of Sciences, the UK National Health Service, and the Cochrane Library all found no link between the MMR vaccine and autism. Physicians, medical journals, and editors have described Wakefield's actions as fraudulent and tied them to epidemics and deaths.

An investigation by journalist Brian Deer found that Wakefield, the author of the original research paper linking the vaccine to autism, had multiple undeclared conflicts of interest, had manipulated evidence, and had broken other ethical codes. After a subsequent 2.5-year investigation, the General Medical Council ruled that Wakefield had acted "dishonestly and irresponsibly" in doing his research, carrying out unauthorized procedures for which he was not qualified, and acting with "callous disregard" for the children involved. Wakefield was found guilty by the General Medical Council of serious professional misconduct in May 2010, and was struck off the Medical Register, meaning he could no longer practise as a physician in the UK.

The Lancet paper was partially retracted in 2004 and fully retracted in 2010, when Lancet's editor-in-chief Richard Horton described it as "utterly false" and said that the journal had been deceived. In January 2011, Deer published a series of reports in the British Medical Journal, in which a signed editorial stated of the journalist, "It has taken the diligent scepticism of one man, standing outside medicine and science, to show that the paper was in fact an elaborate fraud." A 2011 journal article described the vaccine-autism connection as "the most damaging medical hoax of the last 100 years".

Wakefield continues to promote anti-vaccine beliefs and conspiracy theories in the United States. In February 2015, Wakefield denied that he bore any responsibility for the measles epidemic that started at Disneyland among unvaccinated children that year. He also reaffirmed his discredited belief that "MMR contributes to the current autism epidemic". By that time, at least 166 measles cases had been reported. Paul Offit disagreed, saying that the outbreak was "directly related to Dr. Wakefield's theory". Wakefield and other anti-vaccine activists were active in the American-Somali community in Minnesota, where a drop in vaccination rates was followed by the largest measles outbreak in the state in nearly 30 years in 2017.

The anti-vaccination movement was historically apolitical, but in the 2010s and 2020s, the movement in the United States has increasingly targeted conservatives. As measles outbreaks increased, so did calls to eliminate exemptions from vaccine administration. As of 2015, 19 American states had suggested legislation to eliminate or increase the difficulty of exemptions. Concurrently, American anti-vaccine activists reached out to libertarian and right-leaning groups such as the Tea Party movement to broaden their base. While earlier anti-vaccination activists focused on health impacts and safety of vaccines, recent themes increasingly involve philosophical arguments about liberty, medical freedom and parental rights.

With the growing anti-vaccine movement from the 2010s onwards, the United States has seen a resurgence of certain vaccine-preventable diseases. The measles virus lost its elimination status in the US as the number of cases continued to rise in the late 2010s, with 17 outbreaks in 2018 and 465 in 2019 (as of April 4, 2019).

==== 2019 and 2025 measles outbreaks ====
Vaccine hesitancy led to declining rates of vaccination for measles, culminating in the 2019–2020 measles outbreaks. The most significant of these, in proportion to the national population, was the 2019 Samoa measles outbreak.

In July 2018, two 12-month-old children died in Samoa after receiving incorrectly prepared MMR vaccinations. These two deaths were picked up by anti-vaccine groups and used to incite fear towards vaccination on social media, causing the government to suspend its measles vaccination programme for ten months, despite advice from the WHO. The incident caused many Samoan residents to lose trust in the healthcare system. UNICEF and the World Health Organization estimate that the measles vaccination rate in Samoa fell from 74% in 2017 to 34% in 2018, similar to some of the poorest countries in Africa.

In August 2019, an infected passenger on one of the more than 8,000 annual flights between New Zealand and Samoa probably brought the disease from Auckland to Upolu. A full outbreak of measles began on the island in October 2019 and continued for the next four months. As of January 6, 2020, there were over 5,700 cases of measles and 83 deaths, out of a Samoan population of 200,874. Over three percent of the population were infected. The cause of the outbreak was attributed to decreased vaccination rates, from 74% in 2017 to 31–34% in 2018, even though nearby islands had rates near 99%. a rate of 14.3 deaths per 1000 infected) and 5,520 cases (2.75% of the population) of measles in Samoa. Sixty-one out of the first 70 deaths were four years old and under, and all but seven were under 15. After the outbreak, anti-vaxxers employed racist tropes and misinformation to credit the scores of measles deaths to poverty and poor nutrition or even to the vaccine itself, but this has been discounted by the international emergency medical support that arrived in November and December. There was no evidence of acute malnutrition, clinical vitamin A deficiency, or immune deficiency as claimed by various anti-vaxxers.

Skepticism about vaccines was similarly deemed a factor in the 2025 Southwest United States measles outbreak.

==== COVID-19 pandemic activism ====
During the COVID-19 pandemic, anti-vaccine activists undertook various efforts to hinder people who wanted to receive the vaccines, with such activities occurring in countries including Australia, Israel, the United Kingdom, and the United States. These included attempts to physically blockade vaccination sites, and making false reservations for vaccination appointments to clog up vaccination booking systems. Protests were also organized by the activists to raise awareness for their cause.

In some instances, anti-vaccine rhetoric has been traced to state-sponsored internet troll activities designed to create social dissension. Worldwide, foreign disinformation campaigns have been associated with declining vaccination rates in target countries. Anti-vaccine activism online, both before and during the pandemic, has been linked to extreme levels of falsehoods, rumors, hoaxes, and conspiracy theories.

Anti-vaccine activists have falsely claimed in social media posts that numerous deaths or injuries had to do with reactions to vaccines. In one highly publicized instance in early 2023, after Buffalo Bills football player Damar Hamlin experienced an in-game episode of commotio cordis, there was an increase in rhetoric and disinformation from figures such as Charlie Kirk and Drew Pinsky making unfounded claims about Hamlin's cardiac arrest and COVID-19 vaccines. In another 2023 incident, college basketball player Bronny James experienced cardiac arrest at the Galen Center at the University of Southern California, leading to assertions that this was a result of receiving a COVID-19 vaccine; it was later revealed that the episode had been caused by a congenital heart defect. Also, anti-vaccine activists believed Foo Fighters drummer Taylor Hawkins died in 2022 from the COVID-19 vaccine, while in actuality it was a drug overdose. In December 2023, The New York Times published a detailed investigation of the distortion and misrepresentation of the circumstances surrounding the death of 24-year-old George Watts Jr. by Robert F. Kennedy Jr. and other anti-vaccine activists. Some unvaccinated persons opposed to COVID-19 vaccination began referring to themselves in social media groups as "purebloods", a term historically connoting racial purity.

Prominent biomedical researcher Peter Hotez asserted that he and other American scientists who publicly defend vaccines have been attacked on social media, harassed with threatening emails, intimidated, and confronted physically by opponents of vaccination. He further attributes the increase in aggressiveness of the anti-vaccination movement to the influence of the extreme wing of the Republican Party. Hotez estimates that roughly 200,000 preventable deaths from COVID-19, mainly among Republicans, occurred in the US because of refusal to be vaccinated. A 2023 study published in The Journal of the American Medical Association found "evidence of higher excess mortality for Republican voters compared with Democratic voters in Florida and Ohio after, but not before, COVID-19 vaccines were available to all adults in the US".

== Strategies and tactics ==
=== Arguments used ===
In a 2002 paper in the British Medical Journal, two medical historians suggested that the arguments made against the safety and effectiveness of vaccines in the late 20th century are similar to those of the early anti-vaccinationists. Both the 19th and 20th century arguments included "vaccine safety issues, vaccine failures, infringement of personal liberty, and an unholy alliance between the medical establishment and the government to reap huge profits for the medical establishment at the expense of the public." However, the authors only considered the use of "newspaper articles and letters, books, journals, and pamphlets to warn against the dangers of vaccination", and did not address the impact of the internet. Comments on YouTube videos during the COVID-19 pandemic clustered similarly around "concerns about side-effects, effectiveness, and lack of trust in corporations and government".

=== Misrepresentation ===
In some instances, anti-vaccine organizations have used names intended to sound non-partisan on the issue: e.g. National Vaccine Information Center (USA), Vaccination Risk Awareness Network (Canada), Australian Vaccination Network. In November 2013 the Australian Vaccination Network was ordered by the New South Wales Administrative Decisions Tribunal to change their name so that consumers are aware of the anti-vaccination nature of the group. Lateline reported that former AVN president Meryl Dorey "claimed she was a victim of hate groups and vested interests" in response to the ruling.

=== Information quality ===
Although physicians and nurses are still rated as the most trusted source for vaccine information, some vaccine-hesitant individuals report being more comfortable discussing vaccines with providers of complementary and alternative medical (CAM) treatments. With the rise of the internet, many people have turned online for medical information. In some instances, anti-vaccine activists seek to steer people away from vaccination and health-care providers and towards alternative medicines sold by certain activists.

Anti-vaccination writings on the internet have been argued to be characterized by a number of differences from medical and scientific literature. These include:

- Promiscuous copying and reduplication.
- Ignoring corrections, even when an initial report or data point is shown to be false.
- Lack of references, difficulty in checking sources and claims.
- Personal attacks on individual doctors.
- A high degree of interlinkage between sites.
- Dishonest or fallacious arguments.

For example, a 2020 study examined Instagram posts related to the HPV vaccine, which can prevent some types of cancer. Anti-vaccine posts were more likely than pro-vaccine posts to be sent by non-healthcare individuals, to include personal narratives, and to reference other Instagram users, links, or reposts. Anti-vaccine posts were also more likely to involve concealment or distortion, particularly conspiracy theories and unsubstantiated claims. In total, 72.3% of antivaccine posts made inaccurate claims, including exaggerating the risks of vaccines and minimizing risks of disease.

=== Disinformation tactics ===
A number of specific disinformation tactics have been noted in anti-vaccination messaging, including:

- Conspiracy theories alleging lies, trickery, cover-ups, and secret knowledge
- Messages crafted for psychological appeal rather than truthfulness
- Appeals to purported authorities falsely represented as being experts in their field
- Impossible expectations: claiming that anything less than 100% certainty in a scientific claim implies doubt and that the existence of doubt disproves the existence of consensus
- Selective use and interpretation of evidence ("cherry-picking"): using obscure or debunked sources while ignoring counter-evidence and scientific consensus
- Result-oriented revision of claims' content: Continually introducing new claims alleging vaccines to be harmful; moving to new claims in support of a preconceived conclusion when existing claims in support of that conclusion are shown to be false
- Misrepresentation, appeals to logical fallacies, and appeals to improper analogy (i.e., to analogy between cases that do not in fact share the parameter[s] on which the claimed analogy is based)
- Personal attacks on critics, ranging from online criticism, public revelation of personal details, and threats to offline activities such as legal actions, targeting of employers, and violence
- Targeting of the vaccine produced by the People's Republic of China: During the pandemic, as retaliation for the PRC's attempts to blame the United States for the pandemic, The Pentagon targeted the PRC's Sinovac COVID-19 vaccine by spreading anti-vaccine misinformation in the Philippines.
- Assertions that the existence of the 1986 National Childhood Vaccine Injury Act implies that the risk of injury by vaccines is high rather than very low

=== Economics of vaccine disinformation ===
Information is more likely to be believed after repeated exposure. Disinformers use this illusory truth effect as a tactic, repeating false information to make it feel familiar and influence belief. Anti-vaccine activists have leveraged social media to develop interconnected networks of influencers that shape people's opinion, recruit allies, impact policy and monetize vaccine-related disinformation. In 2022, the Journal of Communication published a study of the political economy underlying vaccine disinformation. Researchers identified 59 English-language "actors" that provided "almost exclusively anti-vaccination publications". Their websites monetized disinformation through appeals for donations, sales of content-based media and other merchandise, third-party advertising, and membership fees. Some maintained a group of linked websites, attracting visitors with one site and appealing for money and selling merchandise on others. Their activities to gain attention and obtain funding displayed a "hybrid monetization strategy". They attracted attention by combining eye-catching aspects of "junk news" and online celebrity promotion. At the same time, they developed campaign-specific communities to publicize and legitimize their position, similar to radical social movements.

=== Misrepresentation of the Vaccine Adverse Event Reporting System ===
In the United States, the Vaccine Adverse Event Reporting System (VAERS) is used to gather information on potential vaccine adverse reactions, but is susceptible to unverified reports, misattribution, underreporting, and inconsistent data quality. Raw, unverified data from VAERS has often been used by the anti-vaccine community to justify misinformation regarding the safety of vaccines; it is generally not possible to find out from VAERS data if a vaccine caused an adverse event, or how common the event might be.

=== Use of misinformation in Philippine anti-vaccine activism ===
Anti-vaccine activism in the Philippines has been amplified through social media platforms such as Facebook, where misinformation spreads widely among low-income users with "free Facebook" access.Online groups like No to Vaccine - Philippine propagate messages about vaccine harms, while emotionally charged narratives rooted in the 2017 Dengvaxia controversy continue to undermine public trust in immunization programs.

Health activists and pro-vaccine groups have pushed back: for instance, the Vaccine Solidarity Movement called on media outlets to stop amplifying unscientific anti-vax views and to rely on qualified experts. Misinformation about vaccine brands (such as Sinovac) and perceived regulatory failures contributes to hesitancy, a tactic leveraged by anti-vaxxers to sow doubt.

In addition, some disinformation campaigns have geopolitical dimensions: a covert campaign reportedly run by the U.S. military in the Philippines spread fears that Chinese-made COVID-19 vaccines were unsafe.

Community-level mistrust is also fueled by moral panic and institutional distrust. Ethnographic studies among Filipino parents document how fear from past vaccine controversies, such as Dengvaxia, continues to resonate in discussions about routine immunization. At the same time, negative vaccine narratives garner strong engagement: a content analysis of YouTube comments on national TV vaccination campaigns found that 80% of comments expressed vaccine-hesitant discourse, and these often received more engagement than pro-vaccine responses.

=== Legal action ===
After Republicans gained a majority in the U.S. House of Representatives in January 2023, the House Judiciary Committee used legal action to oppose both disinformation research and government involvement in fighting disinformation. One of the projects targeted was the Virality Project, which has examined the spread of false claims about vaccines. The House Judiciary Committee sent letters, subpoenas, and threats of legal action to researchers, demanding notes, emails and other records from researchers and even student interns, dating back to 2015. Institutions subjected to such inquiries included the Stanford Internet Observatory at Stanford University, the University of Washington, the Atlantic Council's Digital Forensic Research Lab and the social media analytics firm Graphika. Researchers emphasized that they have academic freedom to study disinformation as well as freedom of speech to report their results.

Despite conservative claims that the government acted to censor speech online, "no evidence has emerged that government officials coerced the companies to take action against accounts". The actions of the House Judiciary Committee have been described as an "attempt to chill research," creating a "chilling effect" through increased time demands, legal costs and online harassment of researchers.

A 2025 Associated Press investigation reported the filing in state legislatures of more than 420 bills that undermined established longstanding public health protections, on matters including vaccines, milk pasteurization, and water fluoridation. Many of these efforts were reported to have been connected to groups linked with Health and Human Services Secretary Robert F. Kennedy Jr. and his "Make America Healthy Again" movement, which critics and professionals say disguises conspiracy theory-driven, anti-science ideas under the label of "health freedom". At the time of the report around 30 measures had already become laws in 12 states.

=== Harassment ===
Persons undertaking efforts to counter vaccine misinformation, including public health experts who use social media, have been targeted for harassment by anti-vaccine activists.

For example, Slovak medical doctor Vladimír Krčméry was a prominent member of the government advisory team during the COVID-19 pandemic in Slovakia, and was the first person in that country to receive a COVID-19 vaccine. Due to his prominent role in the vaccination campaign, Krčméry and his family became a target of anti-vaccine activists, who physically threatened him and his family.

In June 2023, Texas-based physician and researcher Peter Hotez tweeted his concerns about Robert F. Kennedy Jr. sharing misinformation about vaccines on Joe Rogan's podcast. Rogan, Kennedy, and Twitter owner Elon Musk asked Hotez to participate in a debate on the podcast. Upon declining the invitation, Hotez was harassed by their fans, with anti-vaccine activist Alex Rosen confronting him at his home.

In his book The Deadly Rise of Anti-science: A Scientist's Warning, Hotez describes how he and other scientists who publicly defend vaccines have been attacked on social media, harassed with threatening emails, intimidated, and confronted physically by opponents of vaccination. He attributes the increase in aggressiveness of the anti-vaccination movement to the influence of the extreme wing of the Republican Party. Hotez estimates that roughly 200,000 preventable deaths from COVID-19, mainly among Republicans, occurred in the US because of refusal to be vaccinated.

At the extreme end, opposition to vaccination has resulted in substantial violence against vaccinators. In Pakistan, "more than 200 polio team workers have lost their lives" (team members include not only vaccinators but police and security personnel) from "targeted killing and terrorism" while working on polio vaccination campaigns.

== Countering anti-vaccine activism ==
Various efforts have been suggested and undertaken to address concerns about vaccines and counter anti-vaccine disinformation. Efforts include social media advertising campaigns, by public health organizations, in support of public health goals.

Best practices for combating vaccine mis- and disinformation include addressing issues openly, clearly identifying areas of scientific consensus and areas of uncertainty, and being sensitive to the cultural and religious values of communities. In countering anti-vaccine disinformation, both factual and emotional aspects need to be addressed.

Whether people will update a mistaken belief is complicated and involves psychological factors and social goals as well as accuracy of information. There is some evidence that both debunking and "pre-bunking" of disinformation can be effective, at least in the short term. Elements that may help to correct inaccurate information include: warning people before they are exposed to misinformation; high perceived credibility of message sources, affirmations of identity and social norms; graphical presentation; and focusing attention on clear core messages. Alternative explanations of a situation need to fit plausibly into the original scenario and ideally indicate why the incorrect explanation was previously thought to be correct.

The cultivation of critical thinking, health and science awareness, and media literacy skills are recommended to help people critically assess information credibility. People who seek out multiple reputable news sources at local and national levels are more likely to detect disinformation than those who rely on few sources from a particular viewpoint.

=== Operation of social media ===
Other suggestions for countering anti-vaccine activism focus on changing the operation of social media platforms. Interventions such as accuracy nudges and source labeling change the context in which information is presented. For example, correct information can be directly presented to counter disinformation. Other possibilities include flagging or removing misleading information on social media platforms. Research suggests that a majority of individuals in the United States would support the removal of harmful misinformation posts and the suspension of accounts. This position is less popular with Republicans than Democrats.

While private entities like Facebook, Twitter and Telegram could legally establish guidelines for moderation of information and disinformation on their platforms (subject to local and international laws) such companies do not have strong incentives to control disinformation or to self-regulate. Algorithms that are used to maximize user engagement and profits can lead to unbalanced, poorly sourced, and actively misleading information.

Criticized for its role in vaccine hesitancy, Facebook announced in March 2019 that it would provide users with "authoritative information" on the topic of vaccines. Facebook introduced several policies chosen to reduce the impact of anti-vaccine content, without actually removing it. These included reducing the ranking of anti-vaccine sources in searches and not recommending them; rejecting ads and targeted advertising that contained vaccine misinformation; and using banners to present vaccine information from authoritative sources. A study examined the six months before and after the policy changes. It found a moderate but significant decrease in the number of likes for anti-vaccine posts following the policy changes. Likes of pro-vaccine posts were unchanged. Facebook has been criticized for not being more aggressive in countering disinformation. In response to efforts to police misinformation, anti-vaccine communities on social media have adopted coded language to refer to vaccinated persons and the vaccines themselves.

Supply-side interventions reduce circulation of misinformation directly at their sources through actions such as application of social media policies, regulation, and legislation. A study published in the journal Vaccine examined advertisements posted in the three months prior to the Facebook's 2019 policy changes. It found that 54% of the anti-vaccine advertisements on Facebook were placed by just two organizations, funded by well-known anti-vaccination activists. The Children's Health Defense / World Mercury Project chaired by Robert F. Kennedy Jr. and Stop Mandatory Vaccination, run by campaigner Larry Cook, posted 54% of the advertisements. The ads often linked to commercial products, such as natural remedies and books. Kennedy was suspended from Facebook in August 2022, but reinstated in June 2023.

In 2023, however, state governments that were politically aligned with anti-vaccine activists successfully sought a preliminary injunction to prevent the Biden Administration from seeking to pressure social media companies into fighting misinformation. The order issued by United States Court of Appeals for the Fifth Circuit "severely limits the ability of the White House, the surgeon general, [and] the Centers for Disease Control and Prevention... to communicate with social media companies about content related to Covid-19... that the government views as misinformation". In October 2023, this injunction was paused by the Supreme Court of the United States, pending further litigation.

=== Use of algorithms and data ===
Algorithms and user data can be used to identify selected subgroups who can then be provided with specialized content. This type of approach has been used both by anti-vaccine activists and by health providers who hope to counter vaccine-related disinformation. For example, in the United States, the CDC's Social Vulnerability Index (SVI) has been used to identify communities that have traditionally been under-served or are at elevated risk for infection, morbidity, and mortality. Programs have been developed in such communities to address disinformation and vaccine hesitancy.

=== Community engagement ===
Steps have been taken to counter anti-vaccine messaging by directly engaging with communities. Outreach efforts include call centers and texting campaigns, partnering with local community leaders, and holding community-based vaccine clinics. Creating digital and science literacy resources and distributing them via schools, libraries, municipal offices, churches and other community groups can help to counter misinformation in under-resourced communities.

The Black Doctors COVID-19 Consortium in Philadelphia is one example of a successful direct outreach initiative. Another is the New York State Vaccine Equity Task Force. In line with the Strategic Advisory Group of Experts (SAGE)'s 3C's model, outreach to communities has focused on addressing mistrust and increasing Confidence, providing information to improve risk assessment (Complacency), and improving access to COVID-19 vaccines (Convenience). It has been necessary to counter disinformation in all three areas.

In the Philippines, countermeasures include nationwide information campaigns led by the Department of Health, collaborations with UNICEF to address circulating misinformation, and initiatives by medical and scientific groups such as the Vaccine Solidarity Movement, which urges media outlets to prioritize expert guidance and avoid amplifying unverified claims. Local health workers and barangay officials are trained to respond to vaccine concerns at the household level, while fact-checking organizations regularly debunk viral social-media posts linking unrelated deaths or illnesses to vaccination. Researchers also highlight the effectiveness of "prebunking" strategies like educating the public about common misinformation techniques before they encounter them, which can reduce susceptibility to anti-vaccine narratives and improve understanding of scientific evidence.

Recommendations for combating vaccine disinformation include increasing the presence of trusted health agencies and credible information on social media, partnering with social media platforms to promote evidence-based public health information, and identifying and responding to emerging concerns and disinformation campaigns. Networked communities of public health officials and other stakeholders, connecting with the public through a variety of credible and trusted messengers, are recommended. Sharing of messages through such networks could help to debunk and counter highly networked and coordinated disinformation attacks.

A networked community approach would differ from the current model of US public health communication, which tends to rely on a single credible messenger (e.g. Anthony Fauci) and is susceptible to disinformation attacks. To deal with disinformation, community networks would need to address issues of liberty and human rights as well as vaccine safety, effectiveness and access. Networks could also help to show support for those attacked by anti-vaccine activists.

=== Strategic messaging and narrative framing ===
Communications strategies often combine factual information with emotionally resonant narratives to enhance vaccine acceptance. Storytelling, testimonials, and culturally relevant examples help convey the benefits of vaccination and counter fear-based narratives. In the Philippines, campaigns have used community stories and real-life experiences to contextualize scientific data and improve public understanding.

Narrative framing also involves tailoring messages to specific audiences by aligning content with their values, beliefs, and cultural context. By framing vaccination as a protective measure for families, communities, or national health, public health authorities can more effectively reach hesitant populations. Strategic messaging is particularly effective when combined with factual evidence, local engagement, and repeated reinforcement across multiple communication channels.

=== Policy, regulation, and institutional measures ===
Governments implement policy interventions to regulate the dissemination of vaccine-related information. Expert advisory committees, regulations, and penalties for spreading false health claims help maintain the integrity of public health messaging. In the Philippines, transparency initiatives ensure that adverse event data and vaccine information are publicly available and accessible.

Institutional measures also include collaboration between health agencies, media regulators, and digital platforms. These partnerships enable rapid responses to misinformation, reinforce accurate reporting, and ensure that public trust is maintained. Policy interventions complement community and digital strategies by providing legal and structural support for evidence-based health communication.

== See also ==
- Anti-vaccine activism in Canada
- Anti-vaccinationism in chiropractic
- Big Pharma conspiracy theories
- COVID-19 vaccine misinformation and hesitancy
- Germ theory denialism
- Health advocacy
- List of anti-vaccination groups
- Oral polio AIDS hypothesis
- Vaccine misinformation
- Vaccines and autism
- Robert F. Kennedy Jr.
  - MMR vaccine and autism
  - Thiomersal and vaccines
