= Maurice Beddow Bayly =

English physician and anti-vivisection activist

Maurice Beddow Bayly MRCS LRCP
- Born: 26 March 1887; Woolwich, London, England
- Died: 22 June 1961 (aged 74)
- Occupations: Physician, activist

Maurice Beddow Bayly MRCS LRCP (26 March 1887 – 22 June 1961) was an English physician, anti-vivisection and anti-vaccination activist, and Theosophist, best known for his opposition to animal experimentation.

== Biography ==
Bayly was born in Woolwich, London. He was educated at St Dunstan's College, London University and Charing Cross Hospital. He was one of the few prominent doctors advocating anti-vivisection in the post-war period.

He worked at the National Anti-Vivisection Hospital with excellent conduct until an incident in 1912 when he was reprimanded for carrying out an unnecessary operation on a terminally ill breast cancer patient. The patient had not suffered during the operation nor did the family make a complaint. Bayly admitted that he had operated not for the patient’s benefit but because he was "anxious to perform the operation". He resigned shortly afterwards.

He was a member of the National Anti-Vaccination League, the Animal Defence and Anti-Vivisection Society, and the English section of the Theosophical Society.

Bayly opposed antitoxin treatment of Diphtheria cases as the research had been based on animal experiments. In 1934, he alleged that the antitoxin does not work as Diphtheria is not caused by the bacterium Corynebacterium diphtheriae but by "drain poison". This opinion wasn't accepted by the medical community.

Bayly contributed a chapter on medicine to the 1938 book Where Theosophy and Science Meet, edited by D. D. Kanga.

== Vegetarianism ==
Bayly was an activist for vegetarianism. He was a speaker at the 15th World Vegetarian Congress in 1957. He contributed to Geoffrey Rudd's magazine Vegetarian World Forum.

== Selected publications ==
- The Schick Inoculation Against Diphtheria (1927)
- Cancer the Failure of Modern Research: A Survey (1936)
- Diet in Relation to Disease: The Case for Vegetarianism (1936)
- The Case AGAINST Vaccination (1936)
- Medicine, in Where Theosophy and Science Meet (1938)
- The Taxpayer and Experiments on Living Animals: With Special Reference to the Work of the Medical Research Council (1938)
- Suffering Caused to Horses in the Manufacture of Anititoxic Serums (1940)
- Inoculation Against Typhoid Fever - A Criticism of its Value and Scientific Basis (1941)
- Spotlights on Vivisection (1946)
- B.C.G. Vaccination (1952)
- The Futility of Experiments on Animals (1956)
- The Story of the Salk Anti-Poliomyelitis Vaccine (1958)
- More Spotlights on Vivisection (1960)
- Clinical Medical Discoveries (1961)
- Vivisection: The Futility of Experiments on Living Animals (1962)

== See also ==
- List of vaccine topics
- Vaccine controversy
