= J. T. Biggs =

British sanitary engineer and anti-vaccinationist

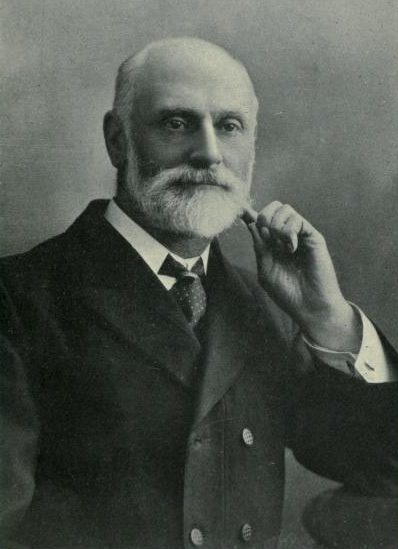
- Born: John Thomas Biggs; 1847
- Died: 1929
- Occupation: Sanitary engineer

John Thomas Biggs (1847–1929) was an English sanitary engineer and activist for anti-vaccination and vegetarianism.

== Anti-vaccination ==
Biggs worked as a sanitary and waterworks engineer. Biggs was a member of the Leicester Board of Guardians. During the smallpox epidemic of 1871–1873 he studied the outbreak and came to the conclusion that vaccination was inefficient to prevent disease. He was a notable figure in the anti-vaccination movement in Leicester. He opposed compulsory vaccination and became the Secretary of the Leicester Anti-Vaccination League in 1870. He was the main organizer of a popular anti-vaccination demonstration that took place on 23 March 1885 outside Leicester Temperance Hall in which the whole practice of vaccination was condemned. It became known as the "Great Leicester Demonstration" with an estimated 80,000 protestors that gathered in the marketplace with anti-vaccination banners.

In 1901, Biggs was a speaker at an anti-vaccination meeting in Kirkcaldy. He argued that people in Leicester had lower rates of smallpox than Glasgow because of improved sanitation, a river passing through the town and its inhabitants were encouraged to go outside and get as much fresh air as possible.

Biggs gave evidence against vaccination to the Royal Commission which was set up to investigate the efficacy of vaccination against smallpox. Biggs testified to the Royal Commission that an anti-vaccination prisoner had been thrown into a "black hole" and made to suffer "every possible degradation". He also stated that a child had caught "a sort of foot-and-mouth disease" from calf-lymph vaccination. Biggs answered 3000 questions and produced 51 statistical tables and 15 diagrams. An error in the official figures during his cross-examination caused a recalculation of his data which took a further two years. To the disappointment of Biggs the 1896 Report of the Commission supported the continuation of compulsory vaccination as protective against smallpox.

Biggs was a member of the National Anti-Vaccination League. His anti-vaccination arguments were criticized in The Lancet journal over two decades. John Douglas Swales has described Biggs' book Sanitation Versus Vaccination as an "exhaustive 785 page volume of misplaced evangelical zeal".

== Vegetarianism ==
Biggs and his wife Catherine were vegetarian. In 1896, he was president of the Leicester Food Reform Society. Biggs was involved in vegetarianism activism and attended a Vegetarian Society meeting in Leicester in 1910.

== Selected publications ==
- Sanitation Versus Vaccination (London: National Anti-Vaccination League, 1912)
