= Kevin Beurle =

Welsh space scientist and computer programmer (1956–2009)

Kevin Beurle (19 January 1956 – 29 May 2009) was a Welsh space scientist and programmer. He worked at Queen Mary, University of London (QMUL), who played a key role in the Cassini–Huygens mission to study Saturn and its moons. He was a specialist in space imaging systems. Beurle was the lead Cassini programmer at QMUL, developing software and designing the spacecraft's observation sequences.

== Life and career ==
Kevin Beurle was born in Swansea on 19 February 1956. He was a fifth-generation vegetarian and the great-great-grandson of the early vegetarian activist George Dornbusch. After attending local schools, Beurle earned a BSc in Physics from Imperial College London in 1976. He continued at Imperial for his PhD research with the Cosmic Rays and Space Physics Group. Following this, he worked as a research assistant, focusing on X-ray astronomy using high-altitude telescopes transported by balloons.

Beurle left Imperial to join Sira Ltd in 1983 but continued his work in space science by developing software engineering and image analysis for the Wide Field Camera on the Röntgen Satellite, a project involving Germany, the US, and the UK.

In 1984, he returned to academia as a lecturer in applied physics at Kingston Polytechnic but soon moved to the Image Processing Group at University College London while also consulting on satellite ground-control systems.

In 1991, he joined the Astronomy Unit at what is now Queen Mary University of London, where he remained for the rest of his career. The unit's mission was to support the UK's participation in the Imaging Science Subsystem instrument on the Cassini spacecraft, part of the Cassini-Huygens mission to Saturn launched in 1997. Beurle's tasks included writing calibration software, planning image sequences, and conducting scientific analysis.

Cassini-Huygens is considered one of the most successful missions to the outer planets, with Cassini still regularly sending back data. Beurle was a key member of the team that discovered several new moons and rings around Saturn. After the spacecraft began orbiting the planet in 2004, the team used Cassini's images to identify new phenomena in Saturn's F ring and provided evidence of ongoing dramatic collisions with nearby moons.

In 2005, Beurle was on the Oval train during the failed 21 July 2005 London bombings.

== Personal life ==
Beurle had one daughter, Angharad.

Beurle had two step-daughters Bethan and Johanna.

Beurle was a scuba diver instructor. He was also a mountaineer and skier.

== Death ==
Beurle died on 29 May 2009 when the hot-air balloon he was riding in collided with another and plummeted 50 m (160 ft) to the ground shortly after take-off in Cappadocia, Turkey. He was the only fatality, though others suffered severe and, in one case, critical injuries.
