= Asenath Nicholson =

American writer, philanthropist and activist (1792–1855)

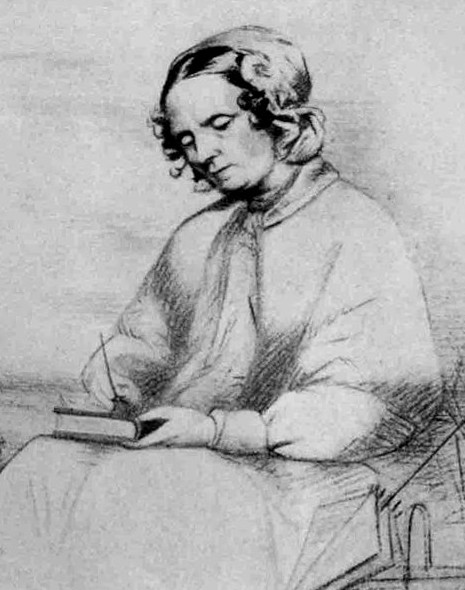
- Nicholson by Anna Maria Howitt
- Born: Asenath Hatch; February 24, 1792; Chelsea, Vermont, U.S.
- Died: May 15, 1855 (aged 63); Jersey City, New Jersey, U.S.
- Resting place: Green-Wood Cemetery, Brooklyn, New York, U.S.
- Occupations: Writer; philanthropist; veganism activist
- Known for: Writing, philanthropy, early veganism advocacy, Great Famine relief
- Notable work: Nature's Own Book (1835); Ireland's Welcome to the Stranger (1847); Kitchen Philosophy for Vegetarians (1849); Annals of the Famine (1851); Loose Papers (1853)
- Spouse: Norman Nicholson (m. 1825; died 1841)
- Children: 3 (stepchildren)

Asenath Hatch Nicholson (born Asenath Hatch; February 24, 1792 – May 15, 1855) was an American writer, philanthropist, and early advocate of veganism. She wrote a first-hand account of the Great Famine in Ireland and campaigned for social reform and humanitarian work. Nicholson wrote some of the earliest works on vegetarianism in the United States, including the first American vegetarian cookbook, Nature's Own Book (1835). She was a proponent of a diet free from animal products, which she advocated in her later work, Kitchen Philosophy for Vegetarians (1849). During the Irish famine, Nicholson distributed food and aid to its victims. Throughout her life, she was committed to physical wellness, pacifism, and social equality.

== Biography ==
=== Early and personal life ===
Asenath Hatch was born in Chelsea, Vermont, on February 24, 1792, the daughter of the early settlers Michael (c. 1747–1830) and Martha Hatch (1745–1837). Her family were Congregationalists, and she was named after the biblical Asenath, the daughter of Potipherah and wife of Joseph.

She trained as a teacher and worked successfully in her hometown before marrying Norman Nicholson around 1825. He was a widower with three children, and the couple relocated to New York.

=== Vegetarianism ===
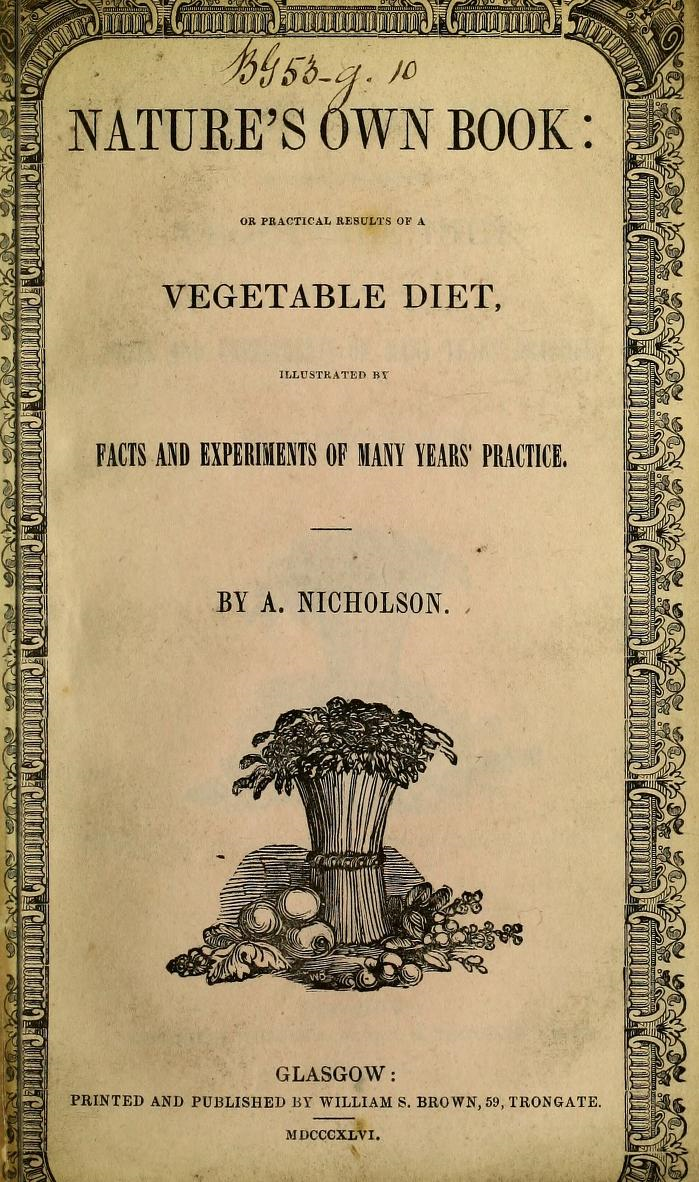
Nature's Own Book, 1846 edition

In New York, the family adopted the vegetarian and coffee-free regimen promoted by Sylvester Graham. In 1835, Nicholson authored Nature's Own Book, the first American vegetarian cookbook. She stated that "good bread, pure water, ripe fruit, and vegetables are my meat and drink exclusively." The book included some recipes with dairy ingredients, but Nicholson advocated against their use.

In the 1840s, the couple operated a boarding house that served meals in accordance with Graham's dietary principles. Nicholson also promoted physical exercise and occasional fasting. She was the first to publish recipes based on Graham's teachings.

=== Kitchen Philosophy for Vegetarians ===
Nicholson authored the cookbook Kitchen Philosophy for Vegetarians, published by William Horsell in 1849. A review in The Vegetarian Advocate, noted that "butter and eggs are excluded" from the recipes. The Vegan Society has cited the book as the first cookbook to exclude animal products.

=== Ireland ===
Nicholson was widowed in 1841. In May 1844, she left New York for Ireland. Upon arrival, she travelled extensively on foot, visiting nearly every county. She observed that many people were unemployed and relied heavily on the potato as their primary food source. In August, she departed for Scotland, having witnessed conditions in Ireland shortly before the onset of the Great Famine. After returning to the United States, she published, she wrote Ireland's Welcome to the Stranger; An Excursion through Ireland in 1844 and 1845, which was published in 1847.

During her travels, Nicholson frequently commented on social inequality and exploitation. While exploring the grounds of Clifden Castle in Connemara, she described discovering a grotto and reflected on the contrast between such luxuries and the poverty experienced by the local population:

Now appeared a fairy castle, a house with variegated pillars and open door, made of shells of the most delicate shades, arranged in stars and circles of beautiful workmanship. These showed exquisite taste in the designer, and must have been done with great cost and care. I found that a laboring peasant was the architect of this wonderful fabric, but he was kept most religiously in his rank, laboring for eight pence a day.

In Roundstone, Nicholson recorded a conversation in which a local man expressed strong resentment toward the potato, describing it as "the greatest curse that ever was sent on Ireland", and attributing its introduction to Walter Raleigh. He argued that the crop allowed landowners to exploit labourers, as it demonstrated that they could survive and work on minimal sustenance:

The blackguard of a Raleigh who brought 'em here, entailed a curse upon the laborer that has broken his heart. Because the landholder sees we can live and work hard on 'em, he grinds us down in our wages, and then despises us because we are ignorant and ragged.

Nicholson reflected that this was "a pithy truth, one which I had never seen in so vivid a light as now."

Nicholson returned to Ireland in 1846, during the second of five consecutive years of potato crop failures, which, along with widespread unemployment, were creating a national crisis. Concerned that she would only be a witness to the suffering, she wrote to the New-York Tribune and The Emancipator, appealing for assistance. As a result, support was mobilized from their readers. In July of that year, five barrels of corn arrived from New York. The same ship also carried 50 barrels intended for the Central Relief Committee, but Nicholson chose to act independently.

=== Later life and death ===
Nicholson left Ireland in the fall of 1848, feeling her mission there was complete. She then traveled to England, where she wrote Lights and Shades of Ireland, with the section on the famine being published in the United States in 1851 as Annals of the Famine. She also joined the pacifist Elihu Burritt’s delegation to the International Peace Congress in Frankfurt and toured Europe. After spending the winter of 1851–52 in Bristol, she returned to the United States in 1852. Her last book, Loose Papers (1853), details her European travels.

Nicholson lived the remainder of her life in relative obscurity, dying from typhoid fever in Jersey City, New Jersey, on May 15, 1855. She was interred at Green-Wood Cemetery in Brooklyn, New York.

== Selected publications ==
- Nature's Own Book (1835)
- Ireland's Welcome to the Stranger: Or An Excursion Through Ireland, in 1844 & 1845, for the Purpose of Personally Investigating the Condition of the Poor (1847)
- Kitchen Philosophy for Vegetarians (1849)
- Lights and Shades of Ireland (1850)
- Annals of the Famine in Ireland in 1847, in 1848 and 1849 (1851)
- Loose Papers: Or, Facts Gathered During Eight Years' Residence in Ireland, Scotland, England, France, and Germany (1853)
