= George Dornbusch =

Austrian-British merchant and social reformer (1819–1873)

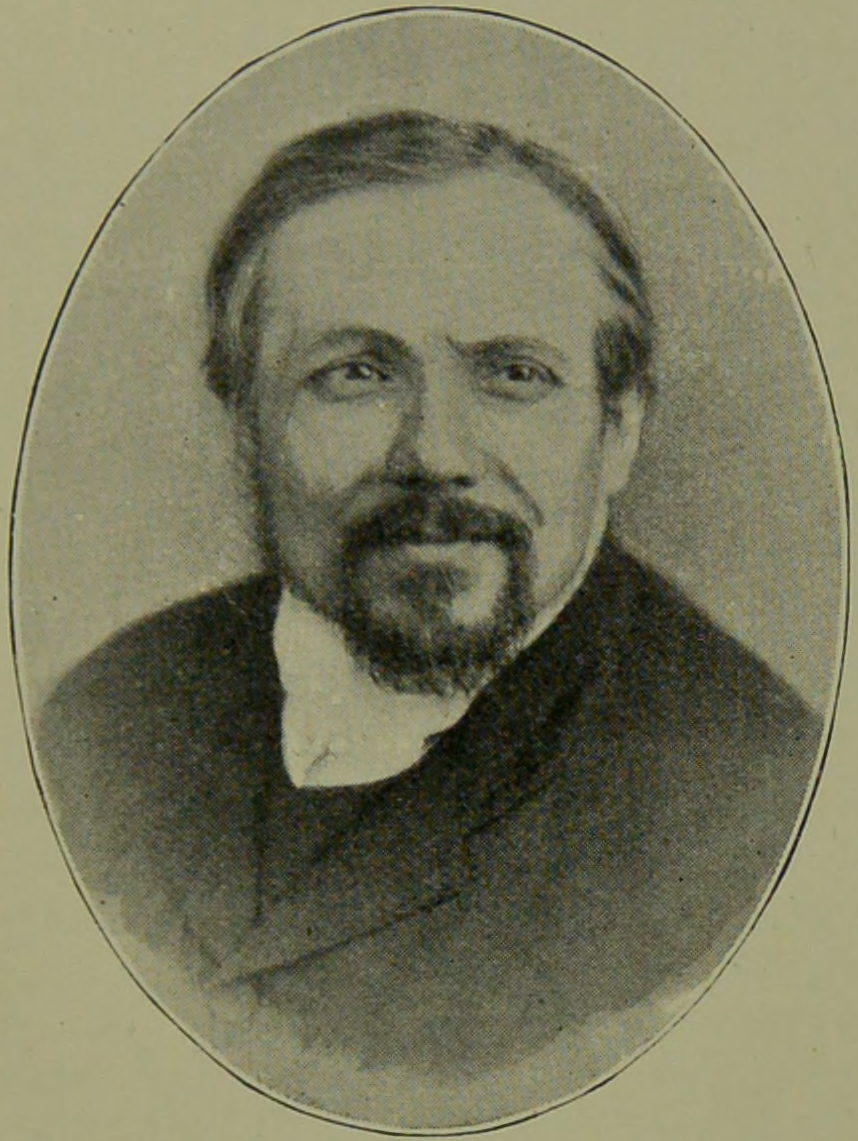
- Dornbusch in Fifty Years of Food Reform (1898)
- Born: Georg Dornbusch; 12 August 1819; Trieste, Austrian Empire
- Died: 5 February 1873 (aged 53); South Hackney, London, England
- Resting place: Abney Park Cemetery
- Occupations: Merchant; social reformer; publisher
- Organizations: Vegetarian Society; London Vegetarian Association
- Spouses: Johanna Wilhelmine Amalie Siemers (m. 1846; div. 1865): Emma Wallis
- Children: 5
- Relatives: Kevin Beurle (great-great-grandson)

George Dornbusch (born Georg Dornbusch; 12 August 1819 – 5 February 1873) was an Austrian-British merchant, social reformer, and publisher. He was active in the Victorian vegetarian movement and supported causes including abolitionism, anti-vaccination, temperance, women's suffrage, and the peace movement.

Dornbusch was born near Trieste, then part of the Austrian Empire, in 1819 and grew up in Hamburg. He adopted a strict vegan diet in 1843 and moved to London in 1845. He worked as a merchant on Threadneedle Street and published The Floating Cargoes Daily List from 1854 to 1873. Dornbusch was one of the first members of the Vegetarian Society, served as its secretary and vice-president, and was also involved with the London Vegetarian Association. He survived an attempted murder by a business rival in 1865, but was permanently disabled. He died from bronchitis in 1873 and was buried in Abney Park Cemetery.

== Biography ==
=== Early life ===
Dornbusch was born Georg Dornbusch (Note: Dornbusch later changed his first name to George.) near Trieste, then part of the Austrian Empire, on 12 August 1819. When he was seven years old, he moved with his family to Hamburg, where he grew up. His father worked for the Swedish-Norwegian post office.

Dornbusch became a vegan in 1843, "partaking neither of fish, flesh, fowl, butter, milk, cheese, or eggs, and abstaining also from the use of tea, coffee, intoxicating drinks, salt, and tobacco". Francis William Newman described him as also abstaining from "every form of vegetable grease or oil, from the chief vegetable spices, such as pepper and ginger, and emphatically from salt".

=== Career ===
Dornbusch moved from Hamburg to England in 1845 and settled in London. He operated a merchant business on Threadneedle Street in the City of London. His business published The Floating Cargoes Daily List, a private daily trade list recording cargo arrivals; it was published from 1854 to 1873.

On 23 December 1865, a business rival attempted to murder Dornbusch. Dornbusch suffered 23 stab wounds and recovered sufficiently to return to work, but was permanently disabled.

=== Social reform ===
Dornbusch was a member of the vegetarian movement in London. He named his house "Vegetarian Cottage" and was one of the first members of the Vegetarian Society. Dornbusch served as the Society's secretary and vice-president. He was also a member of the London Vegetarian Association.

Dornbusch served as treasurer of the Stop-the-War League and was a member of the general committee of the Emancipation Society, along with John Stuart Mill. He was also involved with the Anti-Compulsory Vaccination League and the National Society for Women's Suffrage, serving on the central committee from 1871 to 1872.

=== Other activities ===
Dornbusch was active in the spiritualist movement and was a Theosophist and a Freemason. He also served as an alderman and was a member of the Hackney vestry.

=== Personal life and death ===
In December 1846, Dornbusch married Johanna Wilhelmine Amalie Siemers, the daughter of a Hamburg merchant. The marriage, which produced two children, ended in divorce in 1865. Dornbusch later married Emma Wallis (Note: The 1861 United Kingdom census lists Emma Wallis as employed as Dornbusch's housekeeper; the 1871 census lists her as his wife.) and they had three children. In 1866, he signed a women's suffrage petition with his daughter Ada, from his first marriage, and his second wife.

Dornbusch died of bronchitis at his home in South Hackney on 5 February 1873, aged 53. He was buried in Abney Park Cemetery, London. Dornbusch's great-great-grandson was the space scientist Kevin Beurle, a fifth-generation vegetarian.

== See also ==
- List of vegetarians
- List of vegans
- History of vegetarianism
- Vegetarianism in the Victorian era
