= Mary Hume-Rothery =

English writer (1824–1885)

Mary Hume Rothery
- Born: 14 December 1824; London
- Died: 14 February 1885 (aged 60); Cheltenham
- Spouse: Rev. William Rothery (m. 1864)
- Parents: Joseph Hume (father); Mary Burnley (mother)
- Relatives: Allan Octavian Hume (brother); William Hume-Rothery (grandson)

Mary Hume Rothery or Mary Catherine Hume-Rothery (14 December 1824 – 14 February 1885) was a British writer and campaigner for medical reform. She campaigned against the Contagious Diseases Act and founded the National Anti Compulsory Vaccination League.

== Early life ==
Rothery was born in London in 1824. Her parents were Mary Burnley, daughter of Hardin Burnley (1741–1823), and Joseph Hume the radical politician: she was their youngest daughter and Allan Octavian Hume was her brother. She travelled on the continent of Europe with her father, and wrote poetry and biblical exposition.

== Married life ==
Mary married the Rev. William Rothery on 9 July 1864, in two London ceremonies: firstly by John Frederick Blake at St Mary, Bryanston Square; and then at the New Church, Argyll Square, by Jonathan Bayley. William's father John Rothery lived at Great Clifton. He had studied at St Bees Theological College, from 1846, and was ordained deacon in 1848, and a priest of the Church of England in 1849, by James Prince Lee, Bishop of Manchester. William and Mary had a shared interest in poetry.

After a number of curacies and incumbencies, William Rothery's last preferment in the Church of England was as curate of Hexham, 1862–4. Testimonial gifts were made to him by the former churchwardens of the Abbey Church there, in June 1864. At the end of 1864 he became pastor of the Middleton Society of the New Church, at Middleton near Manchester.

In 1865 William published a pamphlet Wheat and Tares. He preached in Middleton at the New Jerusalem Church, Wood Street. He was not long there. He then moved to a room in the Middleton Baths; and subsequently was found a chapel on Manchester Old Road. Mary gave lectures there; William was sometimes ill, and she preached in his place.

The couple adopted the name Hume-Rothery in 1866. They later moved to south-west England. This was at some point in the early 1870s. In Crockford's Clerical Directory for 1874, William's address is given as Merton Lodge, Tivoli, Cheltenham.

== Activism ==
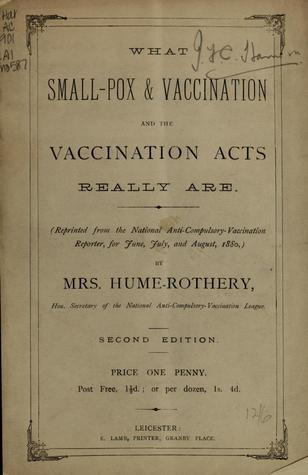
Publication in 1880

Mary Hume-Rothery called for universal suffrage in April 1867, in the Manchester Examiner and Times. She put more emphasis on principle than Lydia Becker, also in the Manchester area, and other more incremental campaigners. She was a leading figure in the Ladies National Association for the Repeal of the Contagious Diseases Acts (LNA) set up in 1869. She was one of the prominent leaders in the LNA's campaign against the Contagious Diseases Acts of 1864, with Josephine Butler, Harriet Martineau and Sarah Richardson. She was a prominent invited speaker for the LNA.

Mary published in 1870 A Letter Addressed to the Right Hon. W. E. Gladstone. This open letter questioned the line drawn between conventional marriage and prostitution. In June of that year, the Anti-Vaccination League held its first meeting, in Manchester and presided over by Francis William Newman, author of Vaccination Considered Politically (1869). It decided to petition parliament against the Vaccination Acts. In December William Hume-Rothery wrote, from 3 Richmond Terrace, Middleton, an extended letter in support of the Anti-Vaccination Society to the editor of the Cosmopolitan, referring to coverage in The Globe and an earlier letter of his from 1869.

In 1871 Mary Hume-Rothery published Women and Doctors; Or, Medical Despotism in England. Its message was to resist government control that discriminated against medicine that was not from trained doctors. Her mentor, Tulk, was an enthusiast for phrenology and mesmerism. She campaigned against male involvement in internal examinations of women; she objected also to men becoming midwives. Her attitude was that male doctors had assisted with the Contagious Diseases Act, that blamed prostitutes for the spread of sexual disease. She attributed her own conversion to anti-vaccination to seeing her own child vaccinated, around 1867.

In 1874 Mary and William founded the National Anti Compulsory Vaccination League (NACVL). William led the anti-vaccination organisation and Mary was the secretary. For some years Cheltenham became the centre of the national movement opposing vaccination, and Mary edited its magazine. In Keighley, Poor Law Guardians were imprisoned, following resistance tactics against vaccination advocated by William. A short notice in the British Medical Journal in 1876 mentioned "the efficacy and value of vaccination" and the need for evidence to counterbalance "such irrational and dangerous agitators as Stevens and Hume Rothery."

== Last years ==
In 1876 William gave up his religious orders. Ultimately, the Hume-Rotherys were less effective campaigners than William Young the chemist, allied to William Tebb and William White, who were more interested in their working-class base, and would pay fines imposed by those refusing vaccination. The Hume-Rotherys had an advocate in the Member of Parliament Peter Alfred Taylor. In 1881 the British Medical Journal complained that a letter on vaccination by Taylor to William Benjamin Carpenter was offensive, and a pamphlet of his "might have been written by Messrs. Hume-Rothery, Baker, Wheeler or Gibbs." The NACVL was eclipsed by the London Society for the Abolition of Compulsory Vaccination in the 1880s.

Mary Hume-Rothery died in Cheltenham in 1885, and William died in 1888.

== Works ==
Mary published a biography of Charles Augustus Tulk, and explanation of his ideas, in 1850. Tulk was a friend of her father's who had persuaded her to become a Swedenborgian. He was not a member of this New Church, but his writings on the church founder's ideas about the "law of correspondence" were addressed to the church members. Her husband by 1864 was described as a New Church pastor. But his Wheat and Tares of the following year was not well received by the New Church, being criticised in 1866 as "Tulkism" (effectively, heretical).

Other works by Mary reflect her Swedenborgian views. Before her marriage there were:

- The Bridesmaid, Count Stephen, and Other Poems (1853)
- The Wedding Guests, Or, The Happiness of Life (1857), novel.
- Normiton: A Dramatic Poem in Two Parts (1857)
- The Golden Rule: And Other Stories for Children (1860)
- Twelve Obscure Texts of Scripture Illustrated according to the Spiritual Sense (1861). The phrase from Emanuel Swedenborg, "love itself and wisdom itself", occurs on p. 57 of this work, as it does on p. 1 of William's Wheat and Tares.
- Sappho: a Poem (1862) It has been considered a feminist analysis of prostitution.

Bessie Rayner Parkes, daughter of Joseph Parkes the Radical Member of Parliament, tried in 1853 to have Marian Evans (George Eliot) notice Mary's poems for the Westminster Review. But she declined, saying "she had not courage to proceed" from a first sample.

The Divine Unity, Trinity, and At-one-ment: A Monograph (1878) was a joint work by William and Mary Hume-Rothery. It was again considered by a reviewer to represent the approach of Tulk. A second edition of Mary's work on Tulk was published in 1890 as A Brief Sketch of the Life, Character, and Religious Opinions of Charles Augustus Tulk by Charles Pooley (1817–1890), a surgeon living in Cheltenham, who added "a short introductory chapter or historical outline of the author's life". He had in 1889 published The Science of Correspondency and Other Spiritual Doctrines of Holy Scripture by Tulk, as editor.

== Family ==
William and Mary's son Joseph Hume Hume-Rothery was born in 1866, and was the father of William Hume-Rothery.
