= Elizabeth Horsell =

English social reformer and writer (1798–1874)

- Born: Elizabeth Gillett
- Baptised: 27 June 1798; Bromyard, Herefordshire, England
- Died: 12 June 1874 (aged 76); Lee, Kent, England
- Occupations: Social reformer; writer
- Known for: Temperance and vegetarianism activism
- Notable work: The Penny Domestic Assistant and Guide to Vegetarian Cookery (1850)
- Spouse: William Horsell (m. 1834; died 1863)

Elizabeth Horsell (née Gillett; bapt. 27 June 1798 – 12 June 1874) was an English social reformer and writer. She was active in the temperance and vegetarianism movements. Horsell authored The Penny Domestic Assistant and Guide to Vegetarian Cookery (1850), an early vegan cookbook. With her husband, the publisher and social reformer William Horsell, she ran a hydropathic establishment in Ramsgate and took part in public lectures and reform work.

== Biography ==
=== Early and personal life ===
Horsell was born Elizabeth Gillett, the daughter of John and Anne Gillett. She was baptised on 27 June 1798 in Bromyard, Herefordshire. She married William Horsell at Vowchurch on 30 June 1834.

=== Social reform ===
From the 1840s, Horsell was involved in the temperance movement and was invited to speak at Dr John Lee's Peace and Temperance Festival. With her husband, she attended vegetarian meetings in London and lectured at venues including the Talfourd Hotel.

In 1846, the couple moved to Ramsgate, where they established a hydropathic boarding house. Before it opened, Horsell ran a family school for the "moral, intellectual and physical improvement" of children.

=== The Penny Domestic Assistant and Guide to Vegetarian Cookery ===
In 1850, Horsell published The Penny Domestic Assistant and Guide to Vegetarian Cookery, a vegan cookbook issued by her husband's press. The book contained recipes without animal products or salt, together with material on domestic economy, industry, hygiene, statistics, and Christian moral instruction. An advertisement in The Vegetarian Advocate described it as a guide to domestic management for vegetarian households.

=== Later life and death ===
After William Horsell's death in 1863, Horsell lived at Sydenham Cottage, Lee, Kent. She remained connected with the vegetarian movement. From her home, she ran a girls' boarding school that accepted vegetarian pupils.

In January 1866, Horsell wrote to The Dietetic Reformer and Vegetarian Messenger to reaffirm her commitment to dietary reform and her abstinence from tea, coffee, and cocoa. She described herself as "a new creature in Christ Jesus", connected vegetarianism and teetotalism with her Christian beliefs, and urged readers to "work while it is called to-day, for the social, physical, and spiritual improvement of your day and generation". She also wrote that she felt "more and more the loss of my dear husband."

Horsell died on 12 June 1874 at Sydenham Cottage, aged 76. She was buried in Lewisham on 18 June.

== Publications ==
- First Principles of Vegetarianism. London: W. Horsell. c. 1848.
- The Penny Domestic Assistant and Guide to Vegetarian Cookery. London: W. Horsell. 1850.
- Divine Ordinance in Reference to Blood Eating. London: W. Horsell. c. 1858. (originally published in The Journal of Health (Part 1 and Part 2))

== See also ==
- Temperance movement in the United Kingdom
- Christian vegetarianism
- History of vegetarianism
- Vegetarianism in the United Kingdom
- Vegetarianism in the Victorian era
- Women and vegetarianism and veganism advocacy
- Women in the Victorian era
