= Anti-vaccinationism in chiropractic =

Pseudoscience

Anti-vaccinationism in chiropractic is widespread, but there are notable differences within the trade. Chiropractic is a form of alternative medicine founded on the idea that all disease is caused by disruption of the flow of "innate" (or innate intelligence) in the spine, by so-called vertebral subluxations – a pseudoscientific concept. Over time chiropractic has divided into "straights" who adhere to the subluxation theory and "mixers" who adhere more closely to a scientifically-based view of anatomy. "Straight" chiropractors are very likely to be anti-vaccination, but all chiropractic training tends to reduce acceptance of vaccines.

Chiropractic anti-vaccinationism has led to negative impacts on both public health and mainstream acceptance of chiropractic.

== Details ==
Most chiropractic writings on vaccination focus on its alleged negative aspects, claiming that vaccination is hazardous, ineffective, and unnecessary.

It is certainly the case that most chiropractic writings on vaccination focus almost exclusively on the negative aspects, either ignoring the huge amount of evidence supporting the benefits of vaccination or summarily dismissing this as "bad science" or government/industrial propaganda.

This is done despite an enormous body of legitimate studies, peer-reviewed work and real-world proof that vaccines lessen the impacts of, and even eliminate, dangerous and deadly diseases. Nonetheless, this area where chiropractors and vaccines intersect has drawn attention, split the profession, led to misinformation, and been the subject of study. Meanwhile, chiropractic training tends to increase opposition to vaccination, and prominent anti-vaccinationists such as Andrew Wakefield have spoken at chiropractic conferences.

Although most chiropractic colleges try to teach about vaccination in a manner consistent with scientific evidence, several have faculty who seem to stress negative views. Some chiropractors have embraced vaccination, but a significant portion of the profession rejects it, as original chiropractic philosophy traces diseases to causes in the spine and states that vaccines interfere with healing. The extent to which anti-vaccination views perpetuate the current chiropractic profession is uncertain.

== Positions of organisations ==
The American Chiropractic Association and the International Chiropractors Association support individual exemptions to compulsory vaccination laws, and a 1995 survey of U.S. chiropractors found that about a third believed there was no scientific proof that immunization prevents disease. The California Chiropractic Association lobbied against a 2015 bill ending belief exemptions for vaccines. They had also opposed a 2012 bill related to vaccination exemptions.

The Canadian Chiropractic Association supports vaccination; a survey in Alberta in 2002 found that 25% of chiropractors advised patients for, and 27% against, vaccinating themselves or their children. Chiropractors have lobbied against pro-vaccination measures such as the removal of personal belief exemptions to vaccine mandates. A survey of a 1999–2000 cross-section of students of Canadian Memorial Chiropractic College (CMCC), which does not formally teach anti-vaccination views, reported that fourth-year students opposed vaccination more strongly than did first-year students, with 29.4% of fourth-year students opposing vaccination. A follow-up study on 2011–12 CMCC students found that pro-vaccination attitudes heavily predominated. Students reported support rates ranging from 84% to 90%. One of the study's authors proposed the change in attitude to be due to the lack of the previous influence of a "subgroup of some charismatic students who were enrolled at CMCC at the time, students who championed the Palmer postulates that advocated against the use of vaccination".

In the United States, courts have examined chiropractic objections to vaccination. The United States District Court for the Southern District of Ohio ruled in the 1985 case of Hanzel v. Arter that belief in chiropractic ethics did not constitute a religious belief justifying exemption from vaccination under a statute permitting religious exemptions. In the 2015 case of Head v. Adams Farm Living, Inc., the North Carolina Court of Appeals ruled that a chiropractor was not competent to attest to the need for a medical exemption for vaccination.

The Australian Chiropractors Association supports the rollout of COVID-19 vaccination, but is against COVID-19 vaccine mandates.
