= Charles Thomas Pearce =

English physician (1815–1883)

Charles Thomas Pearce (1815–1883) M.D., M.R.C.S., F.R.S., was an English physician and early opponent of mandatory vaccination. A member of the Royal College of Surgeons, fellow of the Royal Society and a Freemason, Charles was a homoeopath and surgeon, with an interest in medical astrology, vegetarianism, improved care for the mentally ill and the cessation of vivisection.

== Biography ==
Born in Westminster, London, he was the son of court tailor Richard David Pearce (1780–1820) and Sarah 'Sally' Bouchet (1777–1855). His mother was of Huguenot descent, her father and brother being noted Southwark brassfounders. Charles married a woman ten years his senior named Elizabeth Eagles at St. George's, Hanover Square, the daughter of a Pimlico carpenter and sister of James Eagles, Shoreditch organ builder, who restored the great instrument in Canterbury Cathedral, in addition to furnishing a number of new churches in Tasmania and Australia. Together, Charles and Elizabeth had four children.

Charles was a Philosophical Instrument maker in 1840, the year his second son Alfred John Pearce (1840–1923) was born. Alfred would become a celebrated medical astrologer and popular almanacist, ″the immortal Zadkiel″,″the world-famed Prophet″, who worked in collaboration with his father as his assistant in the early 1870s. Alfred would become an initiate of the Hermetic Order of the Golden Dawn.

Charles Thomas Pearce lived for some time at St. Dunstan's Villa, Regent's Park, the home of his sponsor, Sir Richard Rawlinson Vyvyan (1800–1879), Tory politician, Fellow of the Royal Society, a geologist and a metaphysician. Charles was "for some years engaged with him in scientific experiments and researches on light, heat, and magnetism." Notes taken by Charles whilst thus "engaged with Sir R. Vyvyan ... in researches on the magnetism of the Moon's rays," were later recorded in a volume entitled "The Weather Guide Book", published by Charles's son, Alfred John Pearce, in 1864.

In 1849, as a medical student, Charles patented an "Apparatus for obtaining light by electric agency," a system published in various journals, including the "Repository of Arts" (vol.14, page 193) and the "Mechanics' Magazine" (vo.51, page 189), as well as being registered at the Enrolment Office.

It was also in 1849 that he was acquitted of a charge of manslaughter brought by the reformer Thomas Wakley, (an appointed coroner) after his brother David Richard Pearce's death from cholera. The prosecution dropped the case during trial after a judge concluded the death was unrelated to Pearce's attempt, authorised by another physician, to treat it by homoeopathy. The homoeopathic community raised two hundred pounds for Pearce's defence, and Pearce's barristers argued that the "indictment was merely an attack on the homeopathic system".

Charles published his arguments against smallpox vaccination in several books including Essay on Vaccination (1868), and campaigned vigorously for the better treatment of the mentally ill. His own wife, Elizabeth Eagles (1805–79), died with "religious mania" in the Peckham House Lunatic Asylum.

In 1868, Charles patented "an invention of improvements in the means of disinfecting or deodorizing rooms, buildings, and ships, applicable also in other purposes." His principal purpose was to find a way to preserve meat and thereby bring to an end the cruel transport of livestock on long ship journeys. This same year, he was elected a fellow of the Royal Society.

From 1872–76, he ran a Hydropathic & Homeopathic Clinic at 'Woodstock House', 19, Nottingham Place, York Gate, Marylebone, in London, until it was closed by a well-publicised scandal involving a fraudulent patient, named Frank Hans Hamilton, and Charles's matron – whom, it was intimated in court, had borne his child.

In 1878, he founded the Hydropathic Establishment & Sanatorium at Durleston Park, on the cliffs above Swanage, Dorset, with his much younger mistress, Annie Kay, who went by the pseudonym of 'Mrs. Agnes Ann Parker'.

Charles Thomas Pearce died on 9 May 1883, at a villa called 'Lessie', in Avenue Road, Torquay, on the Devonshire coast.

He is the maternal 3-great grandfather of British author and charity-founder David Charles Manners.

== Publications ==
- 1853, Diarrhœa and Cholera: their homœopathic treatment and prevention briefly described, Northampton.
- 1858, "The Medical Practitioners Bill: a brief analysis of its oppressive and unconstitutional clauses, addressed to the Earl of Derby", J. Taylor & Son
- 1868, Essay on Vaccination: its source, nature and effects
- 1868, "Vaccination: its tested effects on Health, Mortality, and Population", Balliere
- 1869, "A Refutation of Dr. Lankester’s "Facts and Reasons in Favor of Vaccination and the Vaccination Laws": Dedicated to the Vestrymen, Guardians, and Parishioners of St. James's, Westminster – Printed for parish distribution, and may be had of the author"
- 1869, "Vaccination, its source, nature and effects: an address delivered at the St. Marylebone Vestry Hall, London, by Charles Thomas Pearce, M.D.", H. Bailliere
- undated, "Homœopathic & Allopathic Medical Institutions: their efficiency, statistics, & cost contrasted"
- 1881, Small-pox & vaccination in London, 1880–81, London: E.W. Allen
- 1882, Vital Statistics: Small Pox Vaccination in the United Kingdom of Great Britain and Ireland and Continental Countries and Cities, London: Society for the Abolition of Compulsory Vaccination
- Charles Thomas Pearce

== See also ==
- National Anti-Vaccination League
- Walter Hadwen
- William Tebb
