= William Horsell =

English social reformer and publisher (1807–1863)

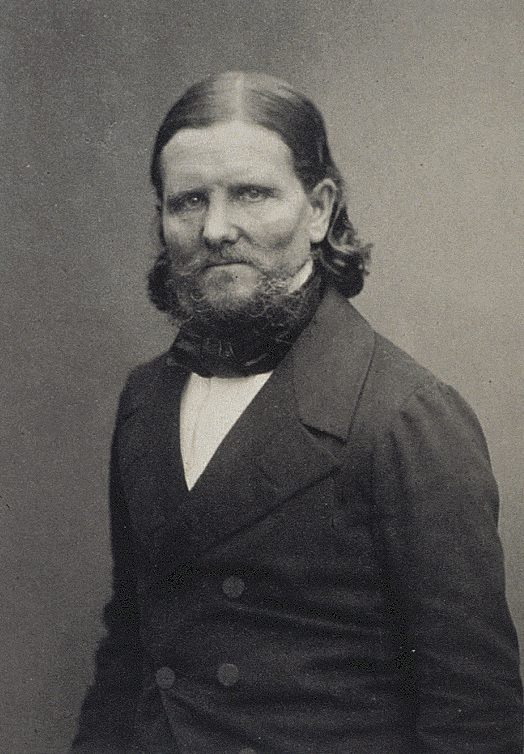
- Horsell, c. 1857
- Born: 31 March 1807; Brinkworth, Wiltshire, England
- Died: 23 December 1863 (aged 56); Aboard the Just
- Resting place: Lagos Cemetery, Nigeria
- Occupations: Social reformer; publisher; editor; hydrotherapist
- Known for: Founding role in the Vegetarian Society; publishing vegetarian literature
- Spouse: Elizabeth Gillett (m. 1834)

William Horsell (31 March 1807 – 23 December 1863) was an English social reformer, publisher, editor, and hydrotherapist. He was involved in the temperance movement, phrenology, hydrotherapy, and the early organised vegetarian movement. He took part in the founding of the Vegetarian Society in 1847 and served as its first secretary. Based in London, he edited the Society's early journal, the Truth-Tester, later renamed The Vegetarian Advocate, and managed the Northwood Villa Hydropathic Institute in Ramsgate.

Horsell published works on diet, health, and spiritualism, including Cholera Prevented by the Adoption of a Vegetarian Diet (1849), The Vegetarian Armed at All Points (1856), and The Science of Cooking Vegetarian Food (1856). He published Asenath Nicholson's Kitchen Philosophy for Vegetarians in 1849, which the Vegan Society has described as the first known vegan cookbook. His wife, Elizabeth, wrote The Penny Domestic Assistant and Guide to Vegetarian Cookery, a cookbook excluding animal products that was also published by Horsell. In later life, he withdrew from public reform work and died of fever in 1863 while travelling on an anti-slavery mission to West Africa.

== Biography ==
=== Early and personal life ===
William Horsell was born in Brinkworth, Wiltshire, on 31 March 1807. Before the age of twenty, he was preaching the gospel, and in 1833 he became active in the temperance movement. He married Elizabeth Gillett at Vowchurch on 30 June 1834.

=== Temperance and anti-nicotine activism ===
In 1838, Horsell established the Anti-Nicotine Society at Congleton, Cheshire. In 1842, he founded the Nature's Beverage Society, which promoted abstinence from all artificial beverages.

=== Hydropathic centre and vegetarianism ===
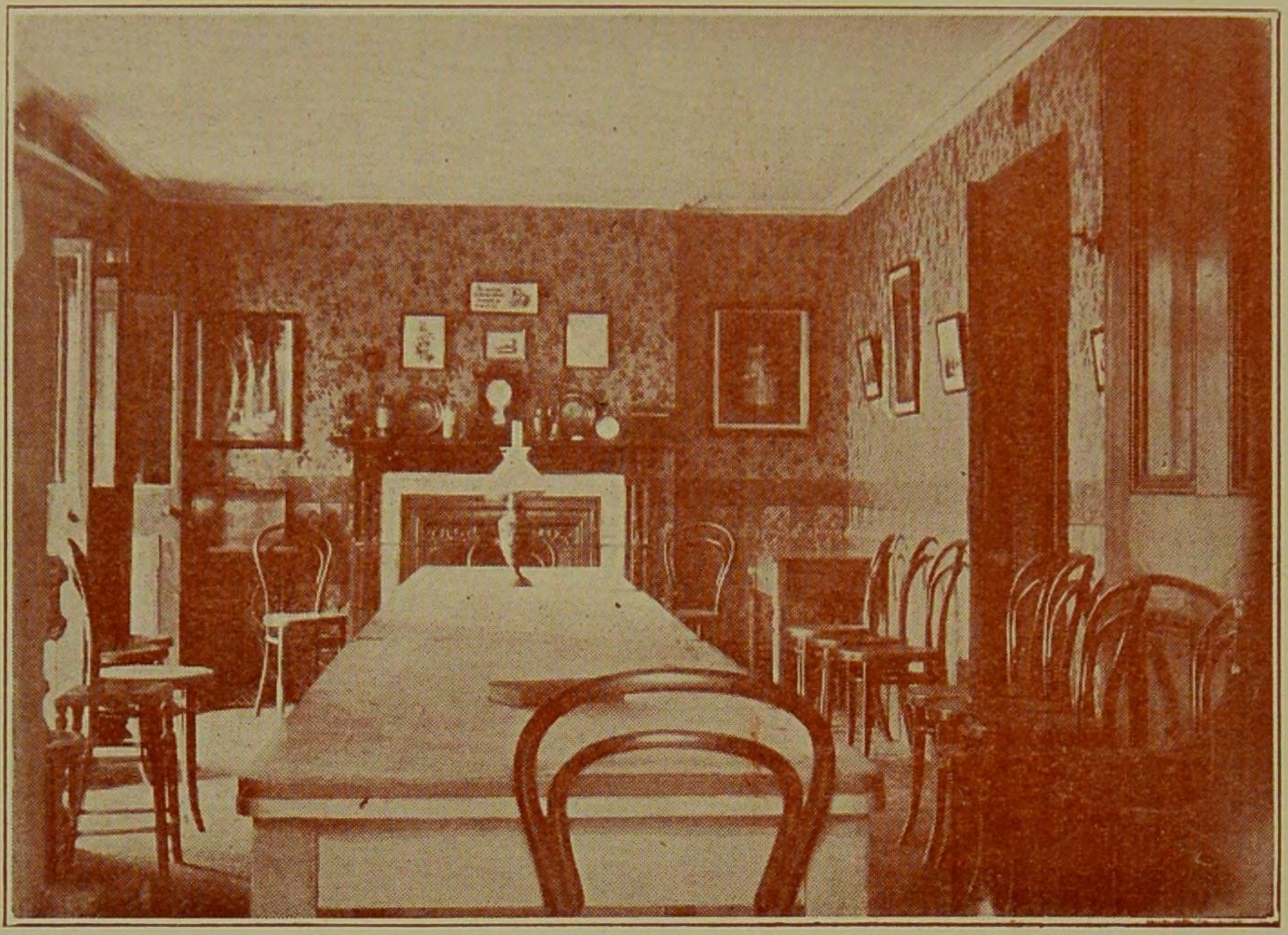
Interior of Northwood Villa, where the Vegetarian Society was founded in 1847

Alcott House was a progressive educational community founded in the 1830s that promoted a plant-food diet. Its members established one of the earliest known hydrotherapy centres in the United Kingdom and published The Healthian, which included an early printed use of the word "vegetarian" in 1842. The publication also advocated a diet based on plant foods.

Around this time, Horsell, then living in Richmond, developed an interest in vegetarianism. When the hydrotherapy centre relocated to the Northwood Villa Hydropathic Institute in Ramsgate, he moved with it and managed the institute as a vegetarian establishment that excluded animal products. Colin Spencer and Charles W. Forward described the institute as the first vegetarian hospital in Britain.

=== The Truth-Tester and the Vegetarian Society ===
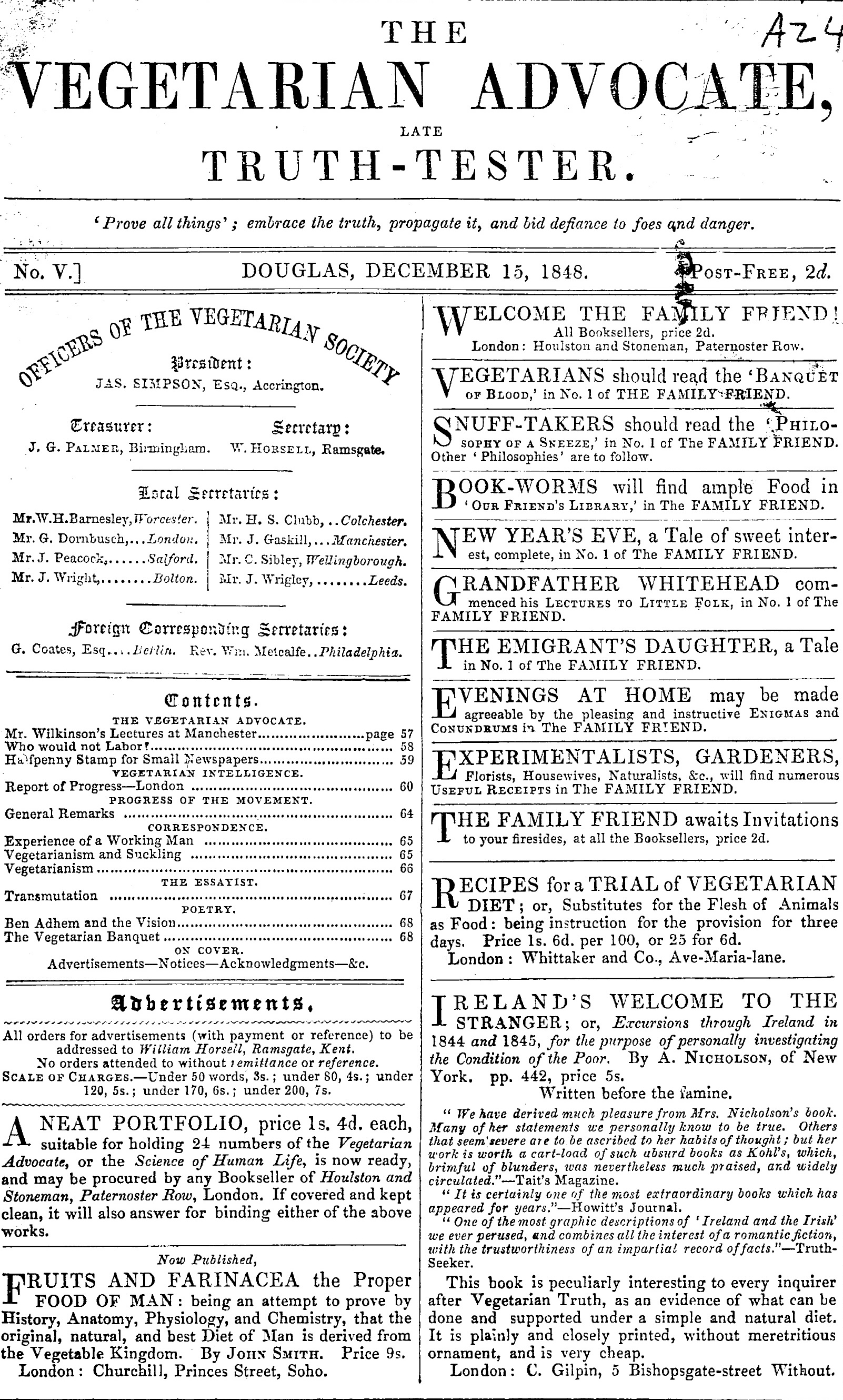
Issue 5 of The Vegetarian Advocate, 15 December 1848

The Truth-Tester was first published in England in 1845 as a temperance journal. In 1846, Horsell purchased it from F. R. Lees, who was preparing to emigrate to America. It was reissued in September, incorporating The Healthian, as the Truth-Tester, Temperance Advocate, and Manx Healthian Journal. It was published from Douglas, Isle of Man, where lower stamp duties applied, and sold for twopence monthly.

In early 1847, a letter published in the Truth-Tester proposed the formation of a vegetarian society. This led to a "physiological conference" organised by William Oldham in July 1847 at the Concordium. The event was attended by up to 130 participants, including James Simpson of the Bible Christian Church, and resulted in several resolutions, including one to reconvene later that year.

On 30 September 1847, a follow-up meeting was held at the Northwood Villa Hydropathic Institute in Ramsgate. Chaired by Joseph Brotherton, MP for Salford and a member of the Bible Christian Church, the meeting formally established the Vegetarian Society. Simpson was elected president, William Oldham treasurer, and Horsell secretary. Horsell managed the Society's affairs from his London office. He also operated the Vegetarian Depôt with his business partner, which served as a publishing and distribution centre for vegetarian literature.

In 1848, the journal came under the auspices of the Vegetarian Society and was renamed The Vegetarian Advocate. It became the Society's official journal and described vegetarianism as "the next practical moral subject which is likely to call forth the virtuous energy of society".

Differences in dietary views contributed to tensions between Horsell and Simpson, who was based in Manchester and favoured the inclusion of eggs and dairy in the vegetarian diet. In September 1849, Simpson launched The Vegetarian Messenger as a rival publication to Horsell's Vegetarian Advocate. Horsell stepped down as secretary in 1850, and the Messenger replaced the Advocate as the Society's official journal.

=== London Vegetarian Association ===
In November 1849, Horsell helped form a committee of London-based vegetarians, which adopted the name London Vegetarian Association (LVA) in 1852. The committee included Viettinghoff, Wiles, Hodgson, G. Dornbusch, and J. Shirley Hibberd, with Horsell serving as treasurer. The LVA promoted meals based on fruits and grains and avoided tea and coffee, reflecting the influence of the earlier Alcott House community, of which many members had also been part.

The LVA's activities were viewed with concern by the Manchester leadership of the Vegetarian Society, who considered its rejection of dairy and eggs too extreme. The dispute continued into early 1856, when Horsell was elected secretary of the LVA. Simpson responded by appointing a "local secretary" of his own choosing, more closely associated with the Manchester view, after which the LVA's activities gradually declined.

=== Other work ===
The Vegetarian Armed at All Points (1856)

Horsell wrote a manual on hydropathy and supported phrenology. He edited the Journal of Health & Phrenological Magazine, which included contributions from the temperance lecturer and fellow phrenologist Jabez Inwards.

He also published literature on vegetarianism and spiritualism. In 1849, he published Asenath Nicholson's Kitchen Philosophy for Vegetarians in London. A review in The Vegetarian Advocate noted that "butter and eggs are excluded" from the recipes. The Vegan Society has described the book as the first known vegan cookbook.

His wife, Elizabeth, was also a vegetarian. In 1850, he published her cookbook, The Penny Domestic Assistant and Guide to Vegetarian Cookery, which excluded all animal products.

Horsell also served as the London agent for the American publishing house Fowler & Wells Company.

Horsell wrote several works on vegetarianism, health, and natural living, including The Board of Health and Longevity (1845), Cholera Prevented by the Adoption of a Vegetarian Diet (1849), Original Views on Diet (1849), Letter to a Friend in Reply to the Question, What Is Vegetarianism? (1849), The Vegetarian Armed at All Points (1856), and The Science of Cooking Vegetarian Food (1856). Some of his works were later translated into German.

=== Later life and death ===
In later life, Horsell withdrew from active involvement in the reform movements he had supported. He died of fever on 23 December 1863 during an anti-slavery mission to Lagos and Abeokuta in present-day Nigeria. After lecturing at Cape Coast on the prospects of the African cotton trade, he died aboard the Just and was buried in Lagos Cemetery on Christmas Day by a fellow missionary. His death was reported in the vegetarian press, as well as the Medical Times and Gazette, the Anti-Slavery Reporter, and Evangelical Christendom.

== Publications ==
=== Writing ===
- The Board of Health and Longevity (1845)
- Cholera Prevented by the Adoption of a Vegetarian Diet (1849)
- Original Views on Diet (1849)
- Letter to a Friend in Reply to the Question, What Is Vegetarianism? (1849)
- Hydropathy for the People (1850)
- The Vegetarian Armed at All Points (1856)
- The Science of Cooking Vegetarian Food (1856)

=== As editor ===
- Truth-Tester (from 1848: The Vegetarian Advocate; 1846–1850)
- The Journal of Health & Phrenological Magazine

== See also ==
- History of vegetarianism
- Vegetarianism in the Victorian era
- Slavery in Nigeria
- Temperance movement in the United Kingdom
