= James Burns (Spiritualist) =

Scottish social reformer (1835–1894)

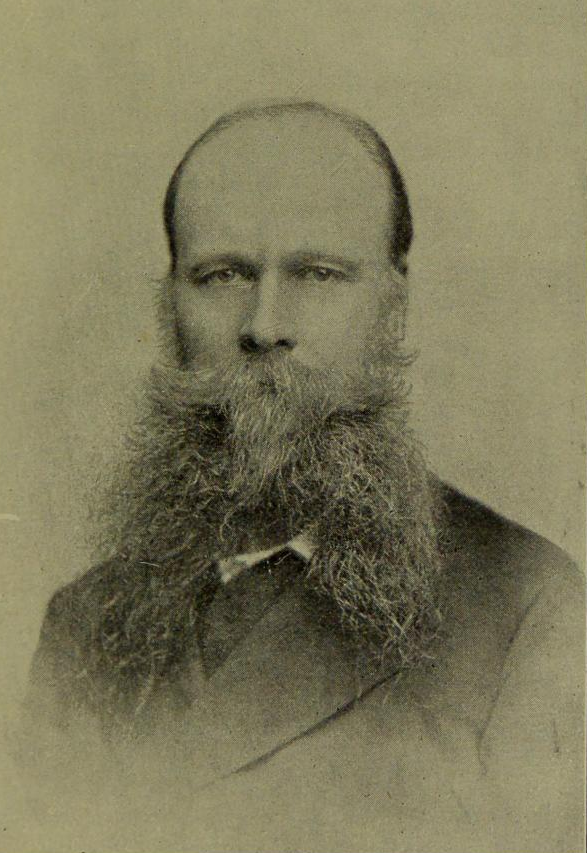
- Born: 1835
- Died: 1894 (aged 58–59)
- Occupations: Spiritualist; social reformer; naturopath; journalist; writer; editor; publisher

James Burns (1835–1894) was a Scottish spiritualist, social reformer, naturopath, journalist, writer, editor, and publisher. He advocated for temperance, anti-vaccination and vegetarianism.

== Biography ==
The son of a poor Ayrshire smallholder-craftsman, Burns became a gardener at Hampton Court in his late teens. He became a propagandist for temperance, and from 1858 to 1862 worked for a temperance publisher. Influenced by reading imported American spiritualist publications, and starting to distribute 'progressive and reformatory' literature to the local working population, Burns founded the Spiritual Institution in 1862, which operated from the same rooms as his 'Progressive Literature Agency'. It was located at 15 Southampton Row.

In 1867, Burns founded Human Nature, a monthly publication which ran until 1877. In 1869 he brought out a halfpenny weekly, The Medium, which absorbed the provincial Daybreak, founded 1867, and was continued as The Medium and Daybreak until 1895. In 1875, Burns published Alfred Russel Wallace's book On Miracles and Modern Spiritualism.

Burn was an anti-vaccinationist. He chaired an organizing committee to establish a hygienic college and hospital in London for the poor. The project did not prosper but Burns was acknowledged by the British Nature Cure Association as the "Late prominent Naturopathic Evangelist."

Burns died in poverty, leaving debts to his son James Burns, Jr.

== Vegetarianism ==
Burns was a vegetarian. Influenced by James Simpson, he joined the Vegetarian Society and during the 1860s lectured on vegetarianism. He sold vegetarian publications through his Progressive Library at his Spiritual Institution. He was vice-president of the London Reform Society and a member of the Vegetarian Rambling Society. He promoted vegetarianism in the Medium and Daybreak. Burns opposed the dietary views of Emmet Densmore which he described as an "anti-vegetarian quackery system".

Burns combined spiritualism and vegetarianism. He established a "Progressive Food and Cooking Society" which announced cookery lessons and free food. A vegetarian publishing house and restaurant was established in Clerkenwell which gave free vegetarian breakfasts to poor children.

Historian Charles W. Forward commented that Burns was "an early and ardent worker in the cause of vegetarianism."

== Selected publications ==
- Madame Blavatsky as a Spiritualist (1889)
