= Lily Loat =

British anti-vaccination activist (1880–1958)

- Born: 21 January 1880; Battersea
- Died: 16 August 1958 (aged 78); Kingswood, Surrey
- Occupation: Secretary of the Anti Vaccination League
- Known for: Anti vaccination activist

Lily Loat (21 January 1880 – 16 August 1958) was a British anti-vaccination activist. She was the Secretary of the National Anti-Vaccination League for nearly 50 years.

== Life ==
Loat was born in Battersea in about 1880 and her father was John Loat. She was head pupil at Tiffin Girls' School in Kingston-on-Thames. After leaving school, she took shorthand lessons and gained her a position at the National Anti-Vaccination League. She worked for the league's secretary answering correspondence and during this time she became a strong supporter of the league. When the secretary resigned she was soon confirmed as the replacement secretary at the beginning of 1909.

During 1920s and 1930s, she was on occasion invited to speak internationally.

The League's journal The Vaccination Inquirer and Health Review had been published since 1880. Loat took on the editorship of the journal in 1932. In 1951, Loat published The Truth about Vaccination and Immunization. This was a small book that itemised the arguments against vaccination. Loat was also opposed to vivisection.

Loat died in Kingswood in Surrey in 1958. She was working for the National Anti-Vaccination League whilst in hospital during her final illness.

== Selected publications ==
- 1939, Pasteurization of Milk: The Case Against Compulsion
- 1951, The Truth About Vaccination and Immunization
