= Trausdorf Airport =

Former airport in Burgenland, Austria, 1957–1994

- IATA: none; ICAO: LOAT

Summary
- Airport type: Public
- Serves: Trausdorf an der Wulka
- Location: Austria
- Opened: 1957; 69 years ago
- Closed: 1994
- Built: 1939
- In use: 1939 — 1945 (Luftwaffe); 1945 — 1955 (Soviet Air Forces)
- Elevation AMSL: 538 ft (164 m)
- Coordinates: 47°47′57.5″N 16°33′28.1″E

Map
- Location of Trausdorf Airport in Austria

Runways
Direction	Length		Surface
Direction	m	ft	Surface
15/33	1,158	3,800	GRASS, landing in various directions
- Source: Landings.com

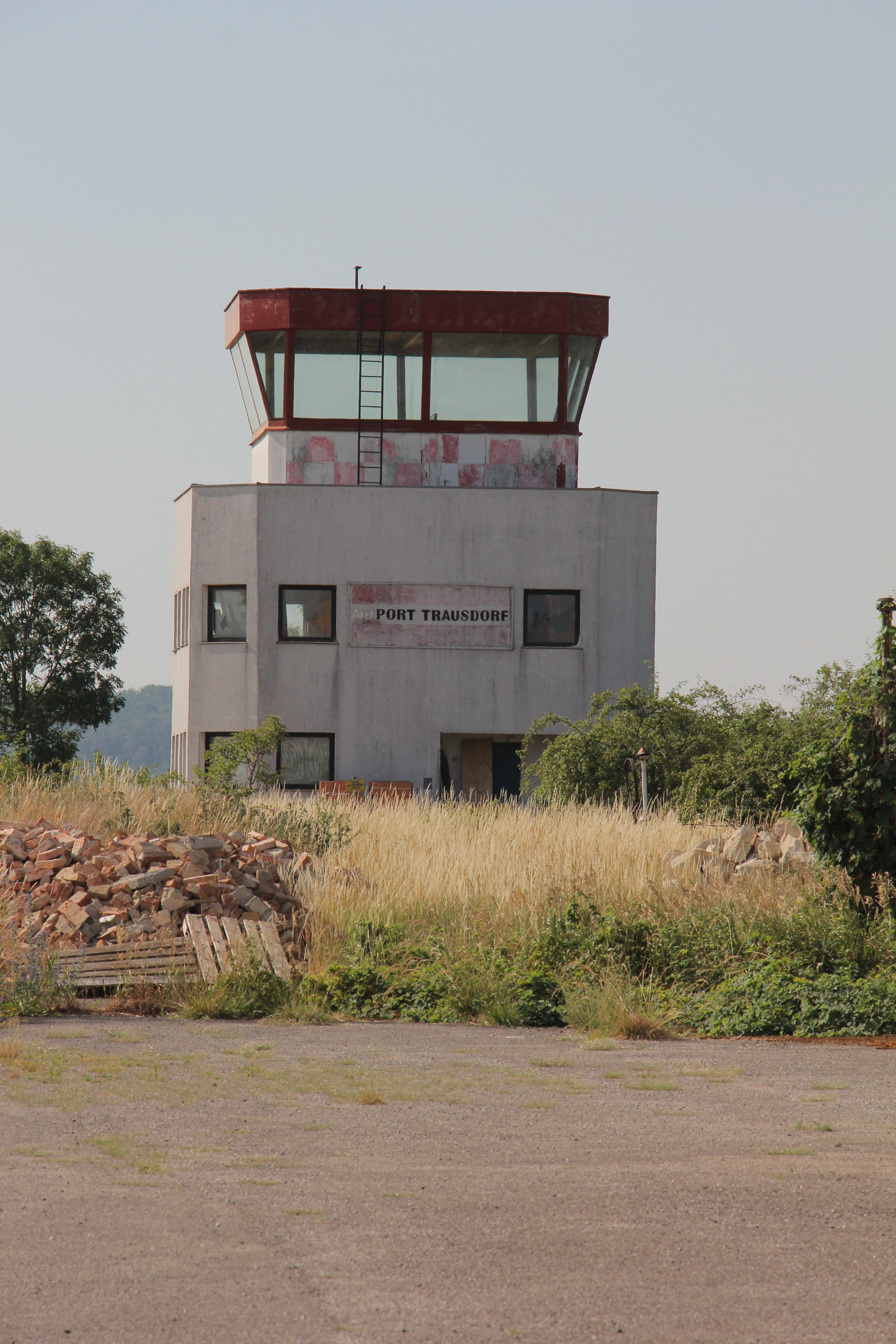

Trausdorf Airport (ICAO: LOAT) was a general aviation airport located 1 km south of Trausdorf an der Wulka, Burgenland, Austria. During World War II, it served as a training field for the Luftwaffe. In 1945, it was captured by the Red Army and was used by the Soviet Air Forces. After withdrawal in 1955, it became a civilian airport in 1957. In the 1960s and 1970s, it became one of the busiest general aviation airfields in the country. A legal dispute with the land owners over the airfield's lease led to the closure of the airport in 1994.

== History ==
In 1939, Trausdorf Airfield was established as a training field for the Luftwaffe. It had a grass field landing ground measuring 1190 x 1100 meters and a single hangar with an adjoining workshop shed and refueling points on the front. On the northern side was a group of barrack huts and northwest of the hangar were administrative buildings. Connected to the landing ground was a southeastern dispersal with 8 aircraft bays cut into the forest on both sides. As it never held any fighter squadrons, the airfield escaped Allied bombing.

On 1 April, 1945, Trausdorf Airfield was captured by the Red Army. During the Soviet occupation of Austria, the Soviet Air Forces began using the airfield. In May 1949, up to 120 fighter aircraft were stationed at the airfield, which were the P-39 Airacobra and P-63 Kingcobra. In July 1949, a watchtower was established on the western perimeter of the airfield. By the 1950s, single-engine fighter aircraft commonly flew from the airfield. It was reported that two regiments of the 9th Guards Fighter Aviation Regiment were stationed at the airfield during August 1950.

=== Civilian use ===
Following the Austrian State Treaty in 1955, the Soviet Air Forces withdrew from Trausdorf Airfield, and it opened for civilian use. In 1957, the Union Sportflieger Club was based at the airfield, and converted it into a sports field for motor aircraft and gliders. In 1963, it was leased by the local community to the club on a 20-year lease arrangement. By the 1960s and 1970s, it became a one of the most frequently used general aviation airfields in Austria. Two grass landing strips measuring 1,100 meters in a north-south direction and 800 meters in an east-west direction were established. In the early 1970s, lighting was established, and three hangars were also built. In 1973, over 35,000 aircraft movements were recorded. In 1977, a control tower was approved by the provincial government and was subsequently built. In 1982, the Department of Aviation Technology was established at HTBLA Eisenstadt, and students and instructors used the airfield. In 1983, the lease ended, and the landowners decided not to renew the lease agreement. In 1988, Pope John Paul II arrived at Trausdorf Airport by a military helicopter to celebrate a holy mass for around 80,000 visiting people. In 1994, Trausdorf Airport was closed following a long legal dispute with the land owners.

== Units ==
The following units that were based at Trausdorf Airfield at one point:

Luftwaffe (School Units)

- Arbeitsplatz for Fliegerführerschule C Wiener Neustadt then Fliegerführerschule C 8, 1939 - 1944
- Arbeitsplatz for Schule / Flieger-Ausbildungs-Regiment 62 then Fliegerführerschule A/B 62 (Bad Vöslau), 1940 - 1943
- Parts of II. / Jagdgeschwader 108, September 1944 – January 1945

Luftwaffe (Station Commands)

- Flugplatzkommando Eisenstadt of Fliegerhorst-Kommandantur A(o) 1 / XVII Wiener Neustadt, April – December 1944
- Fliegerhorst-Kommandantur E(v) 221 / VIII, circa January – March 1945

== Accidents & incidents ==
- On 5 October, 1972, a Cessna L-19A Bird Dog registered as OE-CCI crashed during take-off. Both of the two occupants escaped unharmed, while the Cessna itself was destroyed.

== See also ==
- List of airports in Austria
