= Percy Kirkpatrick =

Irish physician, historian and writer

Thomas Percy Claude Kirkpatrick (10 September 1869 – 9 July 1954) was an eminent Irish physician, historian and writer.

== Life ==
He was born in Dublin, son of John Rutherford Kirkpatrick, also a noted physician. He was educated at Foyle College, Derry, and Trinity College, Dublin. He became an MD at 26 years of age. In 1900, he was appointed assistant physician at Dr Steevens' Hospital. He became a lecturer in anaesthetics at the medical school there, a post he held for 44 years. In 1913 he was appointed governor of the hospital.

In 1908 he was appointed registrar of the Royal College of Physicians of Ireland. He was for many years consultant at the Lock Hospital, Dublin.

He published a number of books on medical history, including the history of Dr. Steevens' Hospital and of the Rotunda Hospital, and over 100 essays.

In his spare time he was a gymnast and member of the Royal Irish Yacht Club and of the Royal Irish Academy, where he was president from 1946 to 1949.

He was an excellent speaker and known for his wit.

== Works ==
- History of Medical Teaching in Trinity College Dublin and of the School of Physic In Ireland. Dublin: Neal. 1912.
- The History of Dr Steevens' Hospital, Dublin 1720–1920. Dublin: University College Dublin. 2008. ISBN 978-1-906359-16-4.
- Henry Quin, M.D., (1718-1791). Dublin: Ponsonby & Gibbs. 1919.

== References and sources ==
Notes

Sources

- Fleetwood, John F (1983). The History of Medicine in Ireland. Dublin: Skellig Press.
