= Premature burial =

Burying a living being

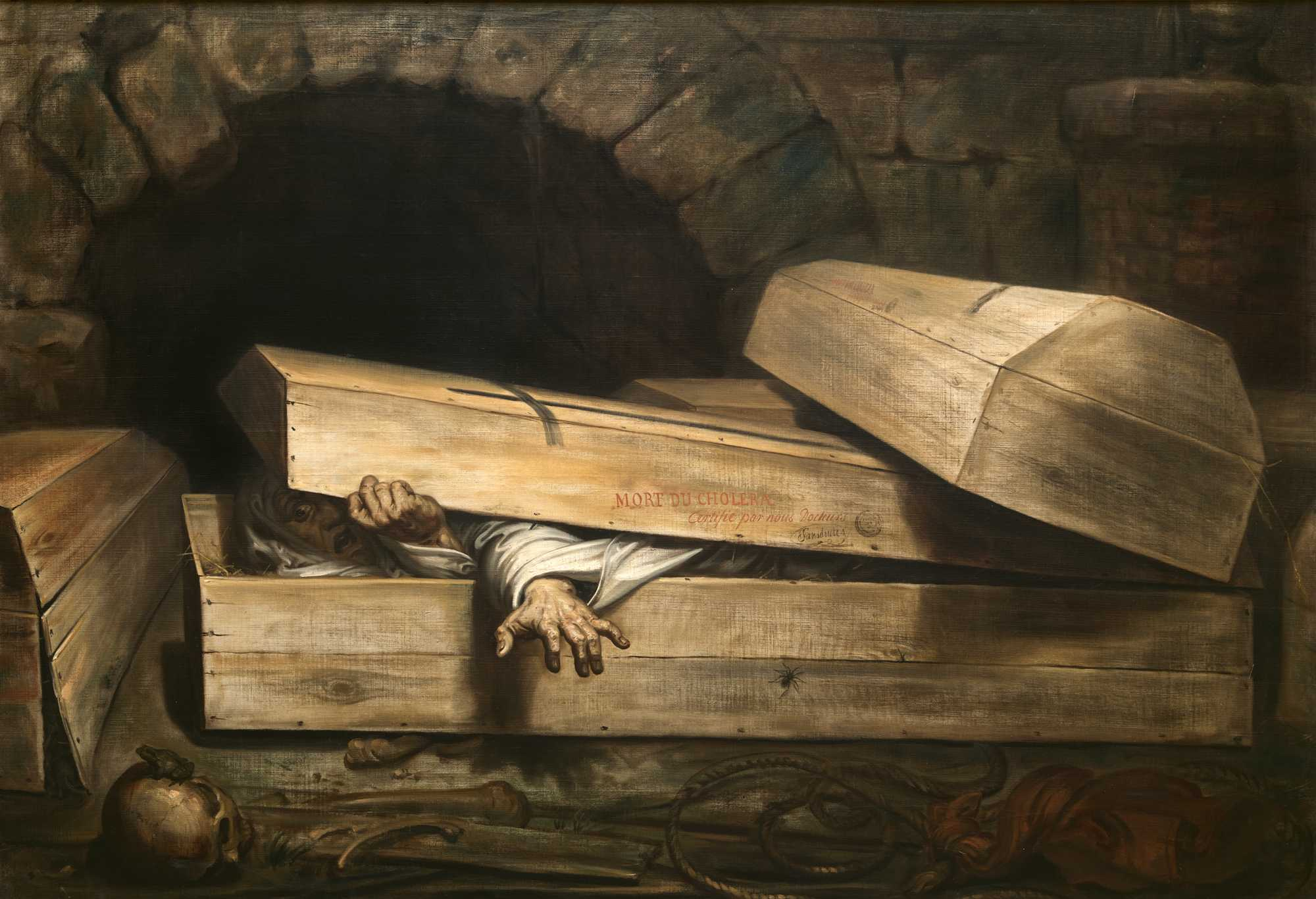
Antoine Wiertz's painting of a man buried alive

Premature burial, also known as live burial, burial alive, or vivisepulture, refers to the act of being buried while still alive.

Animals, including humans, may be buried alive accidentally on the mistaken assumption that they are dead, or intentionally as a form of torture, murder, or execution. It may also occur with the consent of the victim as a part of a stunt, with the intention to escape, or a challenge, when the participant is supposed to be dug up after spending some time in the coffin (many YouTubers have successfully completed this challenge). Taphophobia, the fear of being buried alive, is reported to be among the most common phobias.

== Physiology ==
Premature burial can lead to death through asphyxiation, dehydration, starvation, or hypothermia. A person trapped with fresh air to breathe can last a considerable time and burial has been used as a very cruel method of execution.

== Types ==
=== Unintentional ===
==== Accidental burial ====
According to a popular legend recorded by Joannes Zonaras and George Kedrenos, two 11th-century and 12th-century Byzantine Greek historians, the 5th century Roman emperor Zeno was buried alive in Constantinople after becoming insensible from drinking or an illness. For three days cries of "Have pity on me!" could be heard from within his verd antique sarcophagus in the Church of the Holy Apostles, but because of the hatred of his wife and subjects, the empress Ariadne refused to open the tomb. This tale is likely apocryphal, as earlier and contemporary sources do not mention it even though they too were hostile to Zeno's memory.

Revivals of supposed "corpses" have been triggered by dropped coffins, grave robbers, embalming, and attempted dissections. Folklorist Paul Barber has argued that the incidence of unintentional live burial has been overestimated and that the normal, physical effects of decomposition are sometimes misinterpreted as signs that the person whose remains are being exhumed had revived once in the coffin. Nevertheless, patients have been documented as late as the 1890s as accidentally being sent to the morgue or trapped in a steel box after erroneously being declared dead.

Newspapers have reported cases of exhumed corpses that appear to have been accidentally buried alive. On February 21, 1885, The New York Times gave an account of such a case. The victim was a man from Buncombe County, North Carolina whose name was given as "Jenkins". His body was found turned over onto its front inside the coffin, with much of his hair pulled out. Scratch marks were also visible on all sides of the coffin's interior. His family was reportedly "distressed beyond measure at the criminal carelessness" associated with the case. Another similar story was reported in The Times on January 18, 1886, the victim of this case being described simply as a "girl" named "Collins" from Woodstock, Ontario, Canada. When she was exhumed it was found "Her shroud was torn into shreds, her knees were drawn up to her chin, one of her arms was twisted under her head, and her features bore evidence of dreadful torture."

According to a newspaper story from 1955, Essie Dunbar, an African American woman from South Carolina, was prematurely buried in 1915 at the age of 30 after reportedly suffering a bout of epilepsy, being exhumed a few minutes later after her sister asked to see her body one more time. The shock of her survival reportedly resulted in several ministers falling into her grave and the mourners fleeing in terror.

In 2001, a body bag was delivered to the Matarese Funeral Home in Ashland, Massachusetts with a live occupant. Funeral director John Matarese discovered this, called paramedics, and avoided live embalming or premature burial.

In 2014 in Peraia, Thessaloniki, in Macedonia, Greece, the police discovered that a 45-year-old woman was buried alive and died of asphyxia after being declared clinically dead by a private hospital; she was discovered just shortly after being buried, by children playing near the cemetery who heard screams from inside the earth; her family was reported to be considering suing the hospital which was responsible. In 2015, it was reported that a separate incident also occurred in 2014 in Peraia, Thessaloniki. In Macedonia, Greece, a police investigation concluded that a 49-year-old woman was buried alive after being declared dead due to cancer; her family reported that they could hear her scream from inside the earth at the cemetery shortly after burial, and the investigation revealed that she died of heart failure inside her coffin. Later, it was discovered that medication given to her by her physicians as part of her cancer treatment was what caused her to be mistakenly declared clinically dead.

In 2018, according to some reports, Rosangela Almeida dos Santos was buried alive in Riachão das Neves, Brazil. The woman, who was declared dead in hospital at the age of 37, was soon buried, but visitors to the cemetery heard noises coming from the depths of her grave. After 11 days, the grave was dug up and the woman's mutilated body was discovered. Some say she was buried alive and tried to get out of the coffin. She was already dead at the time of the excavation. It is believed that she may have died not long before. The incident was also recorded on video.

The family of Timesha Beauchamp of Southfield, Michigan called 911 on August 23, 2020, when they found her unresponsive at home. Upon arrival, paramedics found her to be unresponsive and not breathing. After they provided cardiopulmonary resuscitation for 30 minutes, she was pronounced dead by a local emergency department physician based on the medical information provided by the paramedics on the scene. Resuscitation efforts were discontinued, and Beauchamp was taken to Cole funeral home in Detroit. Staff at the funeral home were preparing to embalm her body when they found her to be breathing. She was first taken to Sinai-Grace Hospital then later transferred to Children's Hospital of Michigan, where she died on October 18, 2020.

In 2022, a body bag was delivered to a Shanghai funeral home during the Omicron variant of the COVID-19 pandemic. Two of the employees detected life signs in the bag, saved the woman and stopped a premature burial.

==== Natural disasters ====
Natural disasters (earthquakes, landslides, mudslides, avalanches) have also buried people alive, as have collapsing mines.

==== Attempts at prevention ====
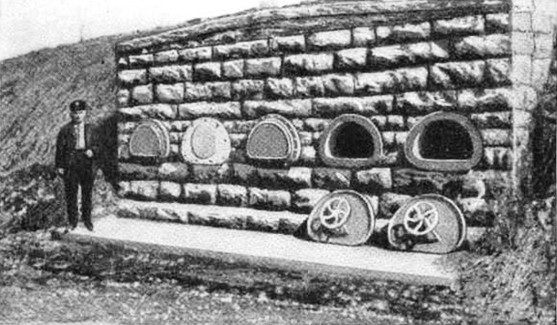
A burial vault built c. 1890 with internal escape hatches to allow the victim of accidental premature burial to escape

According to the history of Nicephorus and perhaps because of the legend of Zeno's premature entombment, or perhaps for other reasons, the Proconnesian marble sarcophagus of the 7th-century emperor Heraclius was left open, on his own instructions, for three days after his interment in the Church of the Holy Apostles' Mausoleum of Justinian.

According to Shane McCorristine, one of the purposes of an Irish wake (which entailed a prolonged waiting period before burial) was to ensure that the person was definitely dead.

Robert Robinson died in Manchester in 1791. A movable glass pane was inserted in his coffin, and the mausoleum had a door for purposes of inspection by a watchman, who was to see if he breathed on the glass. He instructed his relatives to visit his grave periodically to check that he was actually dead.

Safety coffins were devised to prevent premature burial, although there is no evidence that any have ever been successfully used to save an accidentally buried person. On 5 December 1882, J. G. Krichbaum received U.S. patent 268,693 for his "Device For Life In Buried Persons". It consisted of a movable periscope-like pipe that provided air and, when rotated or pushed by the person interred, indicated to passersby that someone was buried alive. The patent text refers to "that class of devices for indicating life in buried persons", suggesting that such inventions were common at the time.

In 1890, a family designed and built a burial vault at the Wildwood Cemetery in Williamsport, Pennsylvania, with an internal hatch to allow the victim of accidental premature burial to escape. The vault had an air supply and was lined in felt to protect a panic-stricken victim from self-inflicted injury before the escape. Bodies were to be removed from the casket before interment.

The London Association for the Prevention of Premature Burial was co-founded in 1896 by William Tebb and Walter Hadwen. Tebb suggested methods such as stethoscopic auscultation of the heart and lungs, application of electric current, and artificial ventilation.

=== Intentional ===
==== Execution ====
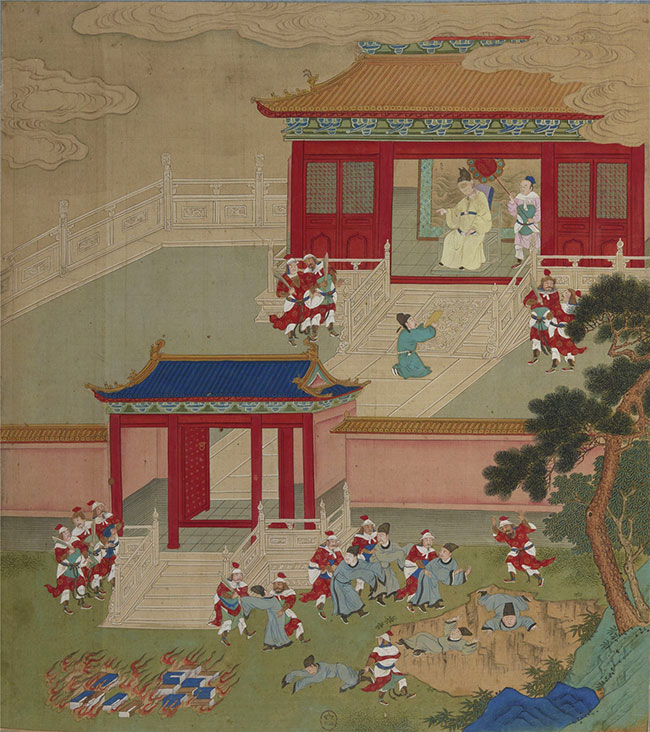
Killing the Scholars and Burning the Books, anonymous 18th century Chinese painted album leaf depicts Confucian scholars being buried alive in Imperial China during the 3rd century BC

The burning of books and burying of scholars (simplified Chinese: 焚书坑儒; traditional Chinese: 焚書坑儒; pinyin: fénshū kēngrú) was purportedly carried out by Qin Shi Huang, the first emperor of a unified China. Books and texts deemed to be subversive were burned and 460 Confucian scholars were reportedly buried alive in 212 BC. Modern scholars doubt these events – Sima Qian, author of the account of these events in the Records of the Grand Historian, was an official of the Han dynasty, which could be expected to portray the previous rulers unfavorably. The single most numerous case of people being buried alive as a way of execution was after the Battle of Changping, where around 200,000 surviving and captured soldiers of the state of Zhao were buried alive.

Tacitus, in his work Germania, records that German tribes practiced two forms of capital punishment; the first where the victim was hanged from a tree, and another where the victim was tied to a wicker frame, pushed face down into the mud and buried. The first was used to make an example of traitors; the second was used for punishment of dishonorable or shameful vices, such as cowardice. According to Tacitus, the Ancient Germans thought that crime should be exposed, whereas infamy should be buried out of sight.

Fleta, a medieval commentary on English common law, specified live burial as the punishment for sodomy, bestiality and those who had dealings with Jews.

Herodotus in his book Histories wrote that burying people alive was an ancient Persian custom, which they practiced in order to be blessed by gods.

They [Xerxes and his troops] marched into the Nine Ways of the Edonian to the bridges and found the banks of the Strymon united by a bridge, but being informed that this place was called by the name of the Nine Ways, they buried alive so many in it so many sons and daughter of inhabitants. It is a Persian custom to bury people alive for I have heard that Amestris, wife of Xerxes, having grown old, caused fourteen children of the best families in Persia to be buried alive, to show her gratitude to the god who is said to be beneath the earth.

In ancient Rome, a Vestal Virgin convicted of violating her vows of celibacy was "buried alive" by being sealed in a cave with a small amount of bread and water, ostensibly so that the goddess Vesta could save her were she truly innocent, essentially making it into a trial by ordeal. Vesta never intervened. This practice was, strictly speaking, immurement (being walled up and left to die) rather than premature burial. According to Christian tradition, a number of saints were martyred this way, including Saint Castulus and Saint Vitalis of Milan.

In Denmark, in the Ribe city statute, which was promulgated in 1269, a female thief was to be buried alive, and in the law by Queen Margaret I, adulterous women were to be punished with premature burial, men with beheading.

In old Swedish province laws ("landskapslagarna"), live burial ("kvick i jord", literally "live into earth"), could be stipulated for a variety of crimes, most notably theft of money or goods of more than one mark's value, though only for women; men were instead hanged. Men could be sentenced to be buried alive as a punishment for bestiality.

In 1611, within Sunnerbo härad in Småland, Sweden, a man faced a death sentence from the Sunnerbo district court for committing bestiality with a horse. The court's archives indicate that the prescribed punishment was either burial alive or burning at the stake, along with the animal. However, the final outcome remains unknown, as the sentence required the King's approval and the relevant documents from that period are believed to be lost.

In 1616, the 18-year old farmhand Tiufrid was sentenced by the governor in Jönköping, Sweden, Nils Stiernsköld, to be buried alive together with the cow with which he had committed bestiality. The execution was carried out in January 1616 at Kinnevalds häradsting (district court). The court records tell how Tiufrid was buried, together with the animal, inside a large stone mound.

Within the Holy Roman Empire a variety of offenses, including rape, infanticide, and theft, could be punished with live burial. For example, the Schwabenspiegel, a law code from the 13th century, specified that the rape of a virgin should be punished by live burial (whereas the rapist of a non-virgin was to be beheaded). Female murderers of their own employers also risked being buried alive. In Augsburg in 1505, for example, a 12-year-old boy and a 13-year-old girl were found guilty of killing their master in conspiracy with the cook. The boy was beheaded, and the girl and the cook were buried alive beneath the gallows. The jurist Eduard Henke observed that in the Middle Ages, live burial of women guilty of infanticide was a "very frequent" punishment in city statutes and Landrechten. For example, he notes those in Hesse, Bohemia, and Tyrol. The Berlinisches Stadtbuch records that between 1412 and 1447, 10 women were buried alive there, and as late as 1583, the archbishop of Bremen promulgated (alongside the somewhat milder 1532 Constitutio Criminalis Carolina punishment of drowning) live burial as an alternate execution method for punishing mothers found guilty of infanticide.

As noted by Elias Pufendorf, a woman buried alive would afterward be impaled through the heart. This combined punishment of live burial and impalement was practiced in Nuremberg until 1508 also for women found guilty of theft, but the city council decided in 1515 that the punishment was too cruel and opted for drowning instead. Impalement was, however, not always mentioned together with live burial. Eduard Osenbrüggen relates how the live burial of a woman convicted of infanticide could be pronounced in a court verdict. For example, in a 1570 case in Ensisheim:

The verdict commanded the executioner to place the perpetrator in the grave alive, "and place two layers of thorns, the one beneath, the other above her. Prior to that he should place a bowl over her face, in which he had made a hole, and to give her through that (in order that she would live for a longer time and expiate the evil act she was condemned for), a reed/tube into the mouth, then jump three times upon her, and lastly cover her with earth".

In this particular case, however, some noblewomen made an appeal for relative mercy, and the convicted woman was drowned instead.

Dieter Furcht speculates that the impalement was not so much to be regarded as an execution method, but as a way to prevent the condemned from becoming an avenging, undead Wiedergänger. In medieval Italy, unrepentant murderers were buried alive, head down, feet in the air, a practice referred to in passing in Canto XIX of Dante's Inferno.

In the Faroe Islands, a powerful 14th-century female landowner in the village of Húsavík was said to have buried two servants alive.

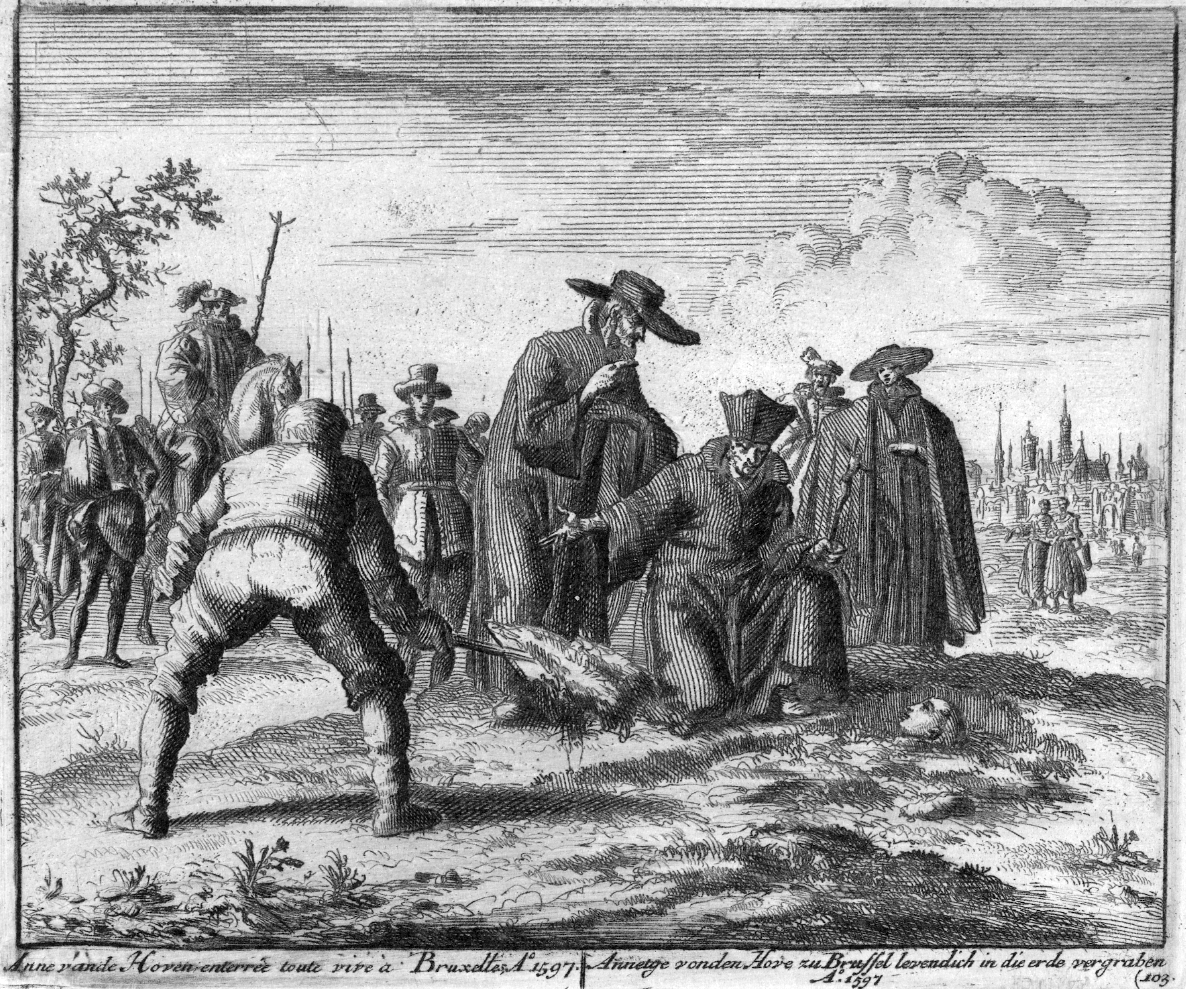
Jan Luyken's drawing of the Anabaptist Anna Utenhoven being buried alive at Vilvoorde in 1597. In the drawing, her head is still above the ground, and the priest is exhorting her to recant her faith, while the executioner stands ready to completely cover her up upon her refusal.

In the 16th century Habsburg Netherlands, when the Catholic authorities made a prolonged effort to stamp out the Protestant churches, live burial was commonly used as the punishment for women found guilty of heresy. The last to be so executed was Anna Utenhoven, an Anabaptist buried alive at Vilvoorde in 1597. Reportedly, when her head was still above the ground, she was given the last chance to recant her faith, and upon her refusal, she was completely covered up and suffocated. The case aroused a great deal of protest in the rebellious northern provinces and foiled the peace feelers which King Philip III was at the time extending to the Dutch. Thereafter, the Habsburg authorities avoided further such cases, punishing heresy with fines and deportations rather than death.

In the seventeenth century in feudal Russia, live burial as an execution method was known as "the pit" and used against women who were condemned for killing their husbands. In 1689, the punishment of live burial was changed to beheading.

Among some contemporary indigenous people of Brazil with no or limited contact with the outside world, children with disabilities or other undesirable traits are still customarily buried alive.

During the Holocaust many victims of mass executions were not shot dead and instead were buried alive. Some people were able to escape the mass graves after the execution was over.

==== Wars ====
Premature burial has been used during wars and by mafia organizations.

Serbian officials are documented to have buried living Bulgarian civilians from Pehčevo (now in the Republic of North Macedonia) during the Balkan Wars. During World War II, Japanese soldiers were documented to have buried living Chinese civilians, notably during the Nanking Massacre. This method of execution was also used by German leaders against Jews, Romani, and Soviet civilians in Ukraine and Belarus during World War II.

During the Algerian War, French troops used to bury Algerian prisoners or civilians alive.

During the Vietnam War, live burials by the Viet Cong were documented during the massacre at Huế in 1968.

During the Gulf War, Iraqi soldiers were knowingly buried alive by American tanks of the First Infantry Division shoveling earth into their trenches. Estimates for the number of soldiers killed this way vary: one source puts it at "between 80 and 250", while Colonel Anthony Moreno suggested it may have been thousands.

In 2014, ISIS buried Yazidi women and children alive in an attempt to annihilate the Yazidi religion.

==== Voluntary ====
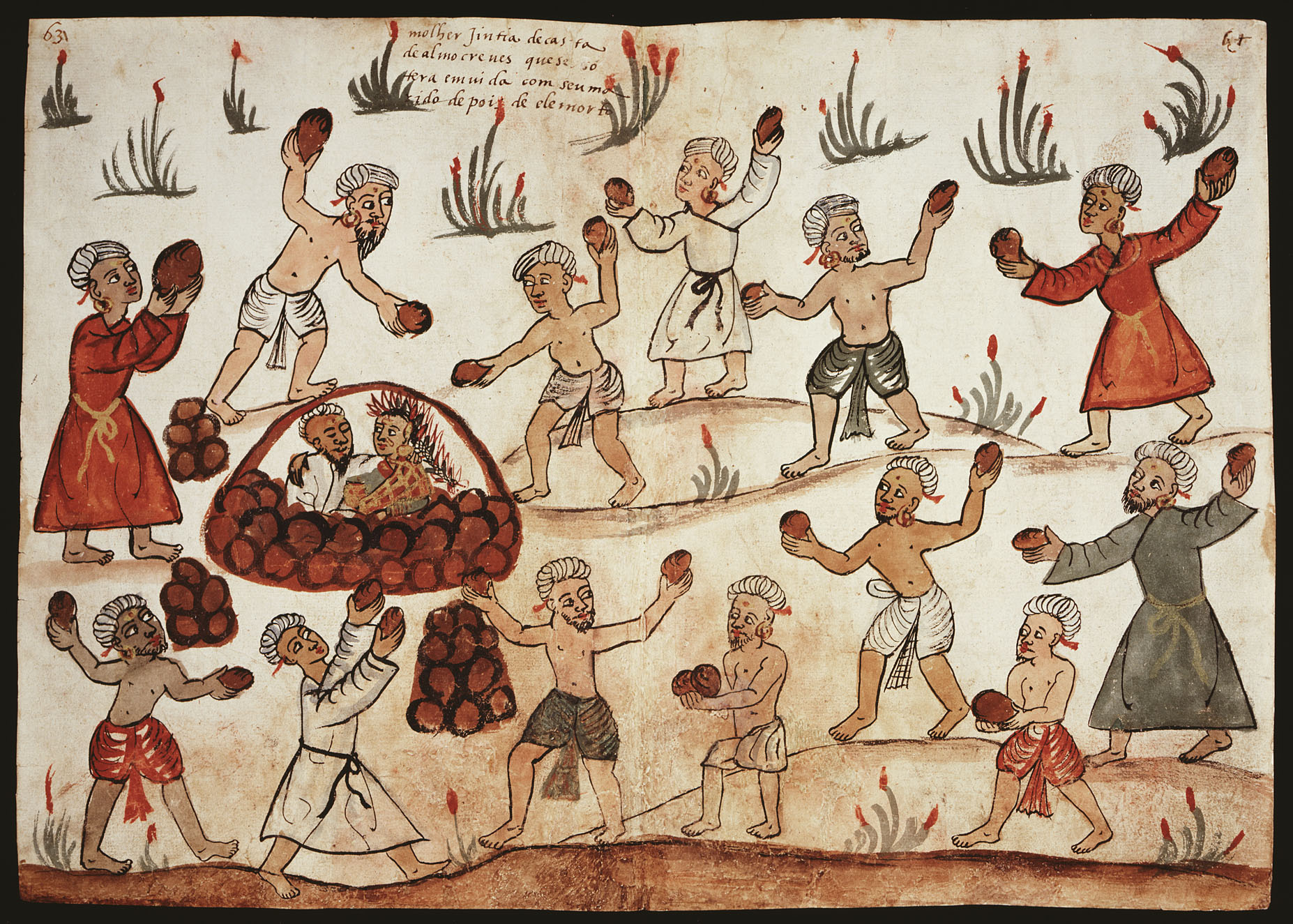
16th-century Portuguese illustration from the Códice Casanatense, depicting a Hindu ritual, in which a widow is buried alive with her dead husband

On rare occasions, people have willingly arranged to be buried alive, reportedly as a demonstration of their controversial ability to survive such an event. In one story taking place around 1840, Sadhu Haridas, an Indian yogi, is said to have been buried in the presence of a British military officer and under the supervision of the local maharajah, by being placed in a sealed bag in a wooden box in a vault. The vault was then interred, the earth was flattened over the site, and crops were sown over the place for a very long time. The whole location was guarded day and night to prevent fraud and the site was dug up twice in a ten-month period to verify the burial before the yogi was finally dug out and slowly revived in the presence of another officer. The yogi said that his only fear during his "wonderful sleep" was being eaten by underground worms. However, according to current medical science, it is not possible for a human to survive for a period of ten months without food, water, and air. According to other sources the entire burial was 40 days long. The Indian government has since made the act of voluntary premature burial illegal, because of the unintended deaths of individuals attempting to recreate this feat.

In 1992, escape artist Bill Shirk was buried alive under seven tons of dirt and cement in a Plexiglas coffin. The coffin collapsed and almost killed Shirk.

In 2010, a Russian man died after being buried alive to try to overcome his fear of death but was crushed to death by the earth on top of him. The following year, another Russian died after being buried overnight in a makeshift coffin "for good luck".

In 2021, the YouTuber MrBeast was voluntarily buried alive for 50 hours. This event was documented and filmed. In late 2023, he again buried himself alive for one week.

Buried Alive is a controversial art and lecture performance series by art-tech group monochrom. Participants have the opportunity to be buried alive in a coffin for fifteen to twenty minutes. As a framework program monochrom offers lectures about the history of the science of determining death and the medical and cultural history of premature burial.

== Myths and legends ==
St. Oran was a druid living on the island of Iona in Scotland's Inner Hebrides. He became a follower of St. Columba, who brought Christianity to Iona from Ireland in 563 AD. When St. Columba had repeated problems building the original Iona Abbey, citing interference from the Devil, St. Oran offered himself as a human sacrifice and was buried alive. He was later dug up and found to be still alive, but when he described the afterlife he had seen and how it involved no heaven or hell, he was ordered to be covered up again. The building of the abbey went ahead, untroubled, and St. Oran's chapel marks the spot where the saint was buried.

In Greek mythology, Queen Philonome was buried alive by her husband King Cycnus for falsely accusing his son Tenes of raping her, which had caused Cycnus to unjustly exile Tenes. The princess Leucothoe was buried alive by her father for losing her virginity. Antigone of Thebes was sealed inside a tomb for burying her brother Polynices against the law, but she took her own life before she could die of dehydration and starvation.

In the fourteenth through nineteenth centuries, a popular tale about premature burial in European folklore was the "Lady with the Ring". In the story, a woman who was prematurely buried awakens to frighten a grave robber who is attempting to cut a ring off her finger.

The TV show MythBusters tested the myth to see if someone could survive being buried alive for two hours before being rescued. Host Jamie Hyneman attempted the feat, but when his steel coffin began to bend under the weight of the earth used to cover it, the experiment was aborted. The hosts concluded it’s not possible for a human to survive being buried alive for more than several hours.

== See also ==
- Edgar Allan Poe returned to the topic of being buried alive repeatedly in his writing. Stories that include the trope are "The Premature Burial", "The Fall of the House of Usher", "Berenice", and "The Cask of Amontillado".
- Alice Blunden, a 17th century woman buried alive
- Eleanor Markham, well known late-19th-century case of narrowly averted premature burial
- Lazarus syndrome, spontaneous return of circulation after failed attempts at resuscitation
- List of premature obituaries
- Locked-in syndrome, medical condition described as "the closest thing to being buried alive"
- Kraven's Last Hunt, a Spider-Man story published by Marvel Comics where Peter Parker is buried alive by the villainous Kraven the Hunter

== Bibliography ==
=== Books ===
- Alighieri, Dante; O'Donnell, E. (1852). Translation of the Divina Commedia. London: Thomas Richardson & Son.
- Barber, Paul (1988). Vampires, Burial and Death: Folklore and Reality. Yale University Press. ISBN 978-0-300-04859-9.
- Berner, Albert F. (1866). Lehrbuch des deutschen Strafrechtes. Leipzig: Bernhard Tauchnitz.
- Bondeson, Jan (2001). Buried Alive: The Terrifying History of Our Most Primal Fear. W.W. Norton & Co. ISBN 0-393-04906-X.
- Bondeson, Jan (2002). Buried Alive: The Terrifying History of Our Most Primal Fear. W.W. Norton & Co. ISBN 978-0-393-32222-4.
- Chang, Iris (1997). The Rape of Nanking: The Forgotten Holocaust of World War II. New York: Basic Books. ISBN 0-465-06835-9.
- Chang, Kang-i Sun; Owen, Stephen (2010). The Cambridge History of Chinese Literature. Cambridge, UK; New York: Cambridge University Press. ISBN 978-0-521-85558-7.
- Encyclopædia Britannica (1823). Encyclopædia Britannica: Or, A Dictionary of Arts, Sciences, and Miscellaneous Literature, Enlarged and Improved, Volume 5. London: Archibald Constable.
- Feucht, Dieter (1967). Grube und Pfahl: Ein Beitrag zur Geschichte der deutschen Hinrichtungsbräuche. Tübingen: J.C.B. Mohr. OCLC 462909742.
- Fidicin, E. (1837). Berlinisches Stadtbuch. Berlin: A. W. Hayn.
- Henke, Hermann W. E. (1809). Grundriss einer Geschichte des deutschen peinlichen Rechts und der peinlichen Rechtwissenschaft, Volume 2. Sulzbach: J.E. Seidel.
- Rosslyn, Wendy; Tosi, Alessandra, eds. (2012). 'Between Law and Morality' in Women in Nineteenth-Century Russia: Lives and Culture. Cambridge: Open Book Publishers. pp. 209–238. ISBN 978-1-906924-65-2.
- Osenbrüggen, Eduard (1868). Studien zur deutschen und schweizerischen Rechtsgeschichte. Schaffhausen: F. Hurter.
- von Pufendorf, Friedrich E. (1757). Observationes iuris universi: Quibus Praecipue Res Judicatae Summi Tribunalis Regii Et Electoralis Continentur. Adjecta Est Appendix Variorum Statutorvm Et Jurium, Volume 1. Lüneburg: Gsellius.
- Stemann, Christian L.E. (1871). Den danske retshistorie indtil Chistian v.'s lov. Copenhagen: Gyldendal (F. Hegel).
- Tacitus, Lucius Cornelius; Church, Alfred J. (tr.); Brodribb, William J. (tr.) (1868). The Agricola and Germany of Tacitus. London: MacMillan & Co.
- Siebenkees, Johann C.; Kiefhaber, Johann C. S. (1792). Materialien zur Nürnbergischen Geschichte, Volume 2. Nuremberg: Schneider.
- Weinryb, Bernard D. (1973). The Jews of Poland: A Social and Economic History of the Jewish Community in Poland from 1100 to 1800. Jewish Publication Society. ISBN 978-0-8276-0016-4.
- Welser, Marcus; Werlich, Engelbertus; Gasser, Achilles P. (1595). Chronica der Weitberuempten... Statt Augspurg. Frankfurt am Main: Hartmann, Wolffgangus.

=== Journals, newspapers, periodicals ===
- BBC News (June 2, 2011). "Russian who buried himself alive dies by mistake". BBC News. BBC.
- "Pakistani police arrest man accused of burying alive his newborn daughter". Calgary Herald. Associated Press. July 14, 2012.
- MacLeod Banks, M. (1931). "A Hebridean Version of Colum Cille and St. Oran". Folklore. 42 (1): 55–60. JSTOR 1256410.
- "A Man Buried Alive" (PDF). The New York Times. February 20, 1885.
- "Buried Alive" (PDF). The New York Times. January 19, 1886.
- Windsor, Henry H. (July 1921). "Odd Family Vault Prevents Premature Burial". Popular Mechanics. 36. Popular Mechanics Co.
- Dibble, Christopher (2010). "The Dead Ringer: Medicine, Poe, and the fear of premature burial". Historia Medicinae. 2 (1). eISSN 1946-3316. Archived from the original on October 27, 2020.

=== Web resources ===
- Arem, Jacob (August 2003). Bock, Fran (ed.). "My Family Trip to Belarus". jewishgen.org.
- Администрация, опубликовано (2008). "ЙОРЦАЙТ". holocaust-museum.org. Archived from the original on September 27, 2013.
- Catholic Encyclopedia. "St. Vitalis". New Advent.
- Cheong, Shahan (2011). "The Killing Fields – Pol Pot and the Khmer Rouge". scheong.wordpress.com.
- Medicine Net.com. "Definition of Taphephobia". Medicinenet.
- Mikkelson, Barbara (2006). "Just Dying To Get Out". Snopes.com.
- Mysterious People. "Mind Power – Strange Cases of Suspended Animation". mysteriouspeople.com.
- Plutarch; Perrin, Bernadotte (1914). "The Parallel Lives by Plutarch". LacusCurtius (Loeb Classical Library).
- Rosen, Rachel (2005). "Virtual Jewish History Tour: Ukraine". jewishvirtuallibrary.org.
- Sciolino, Elaine (October 6, 2007). "A Priest Methodically Reveals Ukrainian Jews' Fate". The New York Times.
- World Holocaust Forum. "Uman. Memoirs of Manie Feinholtz". World Holocaust Forum.
- Yad Vashem. "Killing Sites: Stalino Region 1941–1942". yadvashem.org.
