= Safety coffin =

Coffin allowing the occupant to signal that they are still alive

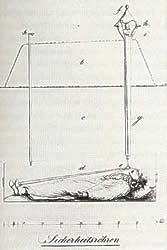
Taberger's Safety Coffin employed a bell as a signaling device, for anybody buried alive.

A safety coffin or security coffin is a coffin fitted with a mechanism to prevent premature burial or allow the occupant to signal that they have been buried alive. A large number of designs for safety coffins were patented during the 18th and 19th centuries and variations on the idea are still available today.

== Origins ==
The fear of being buried alive peaked during the cholera epidemics of the 19th century, when fear of contagion led to quick burials without making a difference between the dead and the dying, but accounts of unintentional live burial have been recorded even earlier.

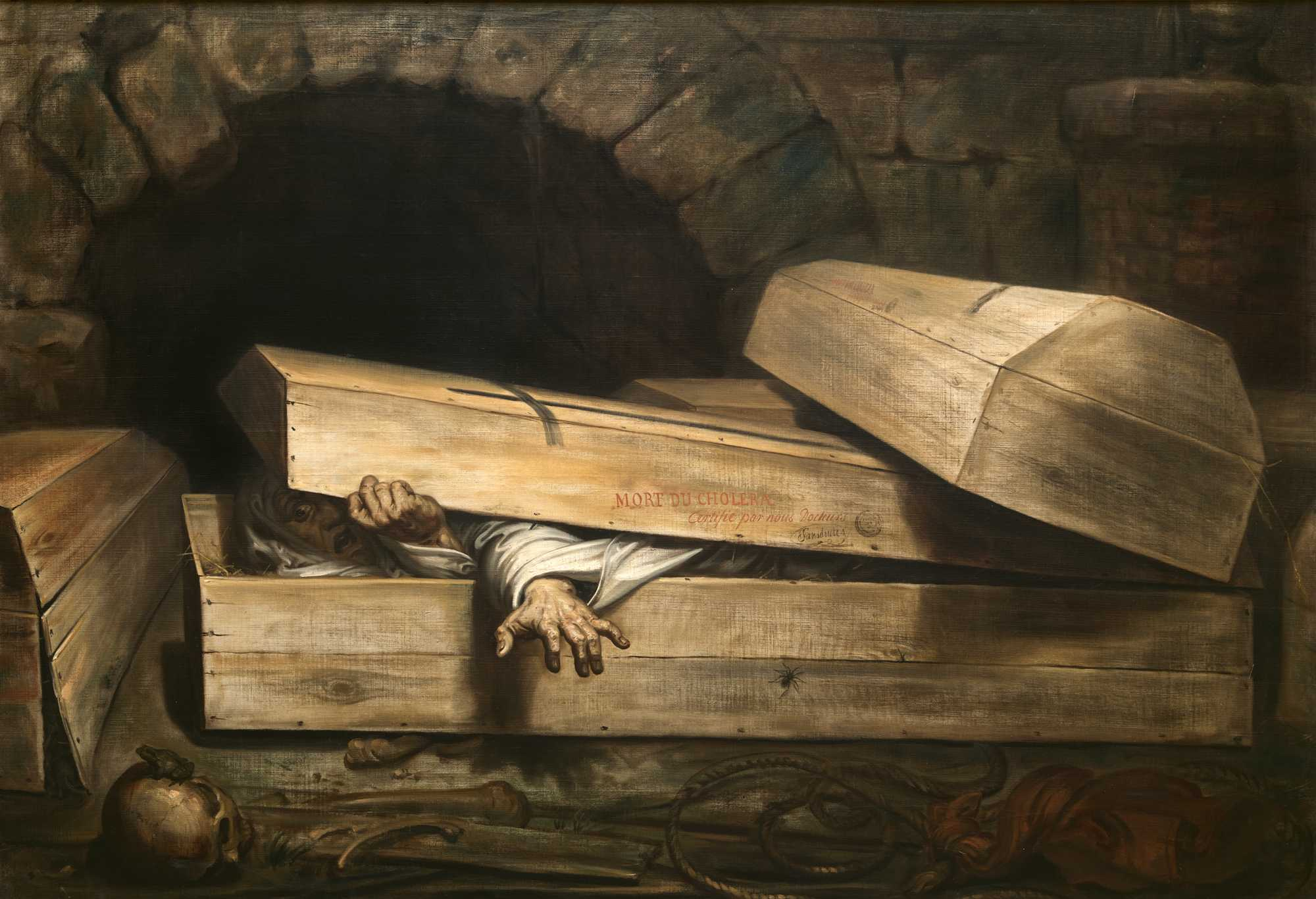
The recovery of supposedly dead victims of cholera, as depicted in The Premature Burial by Antoine Wiertz, fuelled the demand for safety coffins.

This fear, known as taphophobia, was heightened by reports of doctors and accounts in literature and the newspapers. Examples of such accounts are William Tebb’s list of premature burials or Dr. Henry Jacques Garrigues affirmation that “out of every 200 coffins put under ground in this country the occupant of at least one of them is simply in a lethargic state and is buried alive”.

== Types ==
The general fear of premature burial led to the invention of many safety devices which could be incorporated into coffins. Most consisted of some type of device for communication to the outside world such as a cord attached to a bell that the interred person could ring should they revive after the burial.

Robert Robinson died in Manchester in 1791. A movable glass pane was inserted in his coffin, and the mausoleum had a door for purposes of inspection by a watchman, who was to see if he breathed on the glass. He instructed his relatives to visit his grave periodically to check that he was still dead.

The first recorded safety coffin was constructed on the orders of Duke Ferdinand of Brunswick before his death in 1792. He had a window installed to allow light in, an air tube to provide a supply of fresh air, and instead of having the lid nailed down he had a lock fitted. In a special pocket of his shroud he had two keys, one for the coffin lid and a second for the tomb door.

P.G. Pessler, a German priest, allegedly suggested in 1798 that all coffins have a tube inserted from which a cord would run to the church bells. If an individual had been buried alive they could draw attention to themselves by ringing the bells. This idea, while highly impractical, led to the first designs of safety coffins equipped with signalling systems. Pessler's colleague, Pastor Beck, suggested that coffins should have a small trumpet-like tube attached. Each day the local priest could check the state of putrefaction of the corpse by sniffing the odours emanating from the tube. If no odour was detected or the priest heard cries for help the coffin could be dug up and the occupant rescued.

Dr. Adolf Gutsmuth was buried alive several times to demonstrate a safety coffin of his own design, which was connected to the surface by a pipe. The pipe had bells installed in it, through which food and light could be provided until the person inside was let out. In 1822 he stayed underground for several hours and even ate a meal of soup, beer and sausages, delivered to him through the pipe.

In 1829, Dr. Johann Gottfried Taberger designed a system using a bell which would alert the cemetery nightwatchman. The corpse would have strings attached to its hands, head and feet. A housing around the bell above ground prevented it from ringing accidentally. An improvement over previous designs, the housing prevented rainwater from running down the tube and netting prevented insects from entering the coffin. If the bell rang the watchman had to insert a second tube and pump air into the coffin with a bellows to allow the occupant to survive until the casket could be dug up.

Christian Eisenbrandt filed a patent in 1843 for a coffin to be used in cases of doubtful death, which worked based on a spring system which would cause the lid to open at the slightest movement coming from inside the coffin.

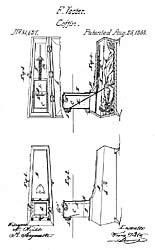
Vester's "Burial Case" was an elaborate variation on earlier bell and cord systems.

The systems using cords tied to the body suffered from the drawback that the natural processes of decay often caused the body to swell or shift position, causing accidental tension on the cords and a "false positive". Franz Vester's 1868 "Burial Case" overcame this problem by adding a tube through which the face of the "corpse" could be viewed. If the interred person came to, they could ring the bell (if not strong enough to ascend the tube by means of a supplied ladder) and the watchmen could check to see if the person had genuinely returned to life or whether it was merely a movement of the corpse. Vester's design allowed the viewing tube to be removed and reused once death was assured.

In 1885, Charles Sieber and Frederick H. Borntraeger patented a casket in which a person would be able to put into operation a fan to create air into the coffin. A lamp would make it possible for someone looking down to see the face of the body in the coffin.

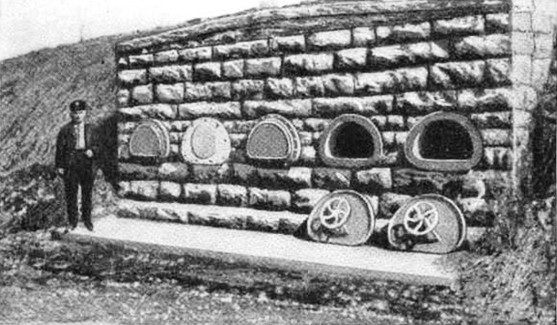
The Wildwood Cemetery burial arrangements.

A 1921 Popular Mechanics Magazine reported the existence of a burial vault built thirty years prior in Wildwood Cemetery, with each casket padded to prevent injury if the supposed dead woke up abruptly, ducts built in to provide fresh air, and handwheels to allow the person to get out.

Count Michel de Karnice-Karnicki, a chamberlain to the Tsar of Russia, patented his own safety coffin, called Le Karnice, in 1897. His design detected movement in the coffin and opened a tube to supply air while simultaneously raising a flag and ringing a bell. In 1898, a man named Faroppo Lorenzo spent nine days in it, making it the longest voluntary burial. Le Karnice never caught on: it was too sensitive to allow for even a slight movement in a decaying corpse, and a demonstration in which one of Karnice-Karnicki's assistants had been buried alive ended badly when the signalling systems failed. Luckily, the breathing tube had activated and the assistant was disinterred unharmed, but the reputation of Le Karnice was damaged beyond repair.

== 20th and 21st century ==
In 1995 a modern safety coffin was patented by Fabrizio Caselli. His design included an emergency alarm, intercom system, a torch (flashlight), breathing apparatus, and both a heart monitor and stimulator.

Since then, however, the practice of modern-day embalming as practiced in some countries (notably in North America) has, for the most part, eliminated the fear of "premature burial", as no one has ever survived that process once completed.

== Problems ==
Despite the fear of burial while still alive, there are no documented cases of anybody being saved by a safety coffin.

In addition to that, numerous factors could cause false alarms, making the coffins inconvenient or the coffins had significant flaws that made them useless.

== In popular culture ==
=== Literature ===
As well as dealing with the subject in "The Fall of the House of Usher" and "The Cask of Amontillado", Edgar Allan Poe wrote "The Premature Burial", which was published in 1844. It contained accounts of supposedly genuine cases of premature burial as well as detailing the narrator's own (perceived) interment while still alive.

=== Film and television ===
A safety coffin appears in the 1978 film The First Great Train Robbery, and more recently in the 2018 film The Nun.

== See also ==
- Burial vault
- Taphophobia
- Lazarus phenomenon
- Tomb
- Burial artists
- Premature burial

== Further references ==
- Patents related to alarms/signals used in connection with coffins for indicating life in persons supposed to be dead.
- Troy Taylor (2000). "Beyond The Grave". Archived from the original on 4 February 2012.
- Jan Bondeson (2002). Buried Alive: The Terrifying History of Our Most Primal Fear. W W Norton & Co Ltd. ISBN 0-393-32222-X.
- Roger Byard (17 May 2023). "Premature burial".
