= Wildwood Cemetery =

Wildwood Cemetery may refer to:

- Wildwood Cemetery (Winchester, Massachusetts)
- Wildwood Cemetery (Amherst, Massachusetts)
- Wildwood Cemetery (Pennsylvania), in Loyalsock Township
- Wildwood Cemetery and Mary Lyon Fisher Memorial Chapel, Lyons Falls, New York
