= Eleanor Markham =

Case of premature burial in 1894

Eleanor Markham was an invented American woman who became one of the most prominent cases of an averted premature burial in the late 19th century. Her existence was disproven within weeks of her story first appearing in newspapers but her story continued to be credulously reported nonetheless.

According to news reports at the time, the 22-year-old Miss Markham was pronounced dead in Sprakers, New York on July 8, 1894, by a Dr. Howard, the family physician. Since the weather was quite warm, it was decided to have the burial quickly, and her coffin was closed and fastened after family members said goodbye on the morning of July 10. But on the way to the graveyard, the hearse was stopped after a noise was heard coming from the coffin. The lid was unfastened to find Miss Markham alive, exclaiming "you are burying me alive!" to which Dr. Howard reportedly said it was a mistake easily rectified.

Markham soon after fainted, but recovered after being administered some stimulants. She stated that she had been conscious the entire time of the preparations for burial, but was unable to cry out. She fully believed she would be buried alive, when finally, using all her will, she was able to make a knocking noise to draw attention.

Within two weeks of accounts of her premature burial first appearing, however, it was reported in the Newburgh Register of Newburgh, New York that the story was a hoax. An investigative reporter for the paper confirmed that no person by that name even lived in the area.

The fear of premature burial was a topic of substantial discussion in the late 19th and early 20th century. Markham's case was among those included in the book Premature Burial and How It May Be Prevented by William Tebb and Edward Vollum. Bill Bryson also mentions the "well-known case" of Markham in his 2010 book At Home: A Short History of Private Life.
