= 1896 Gloucester smallpox epidemic =

Disease outbreak in Gloucester, England

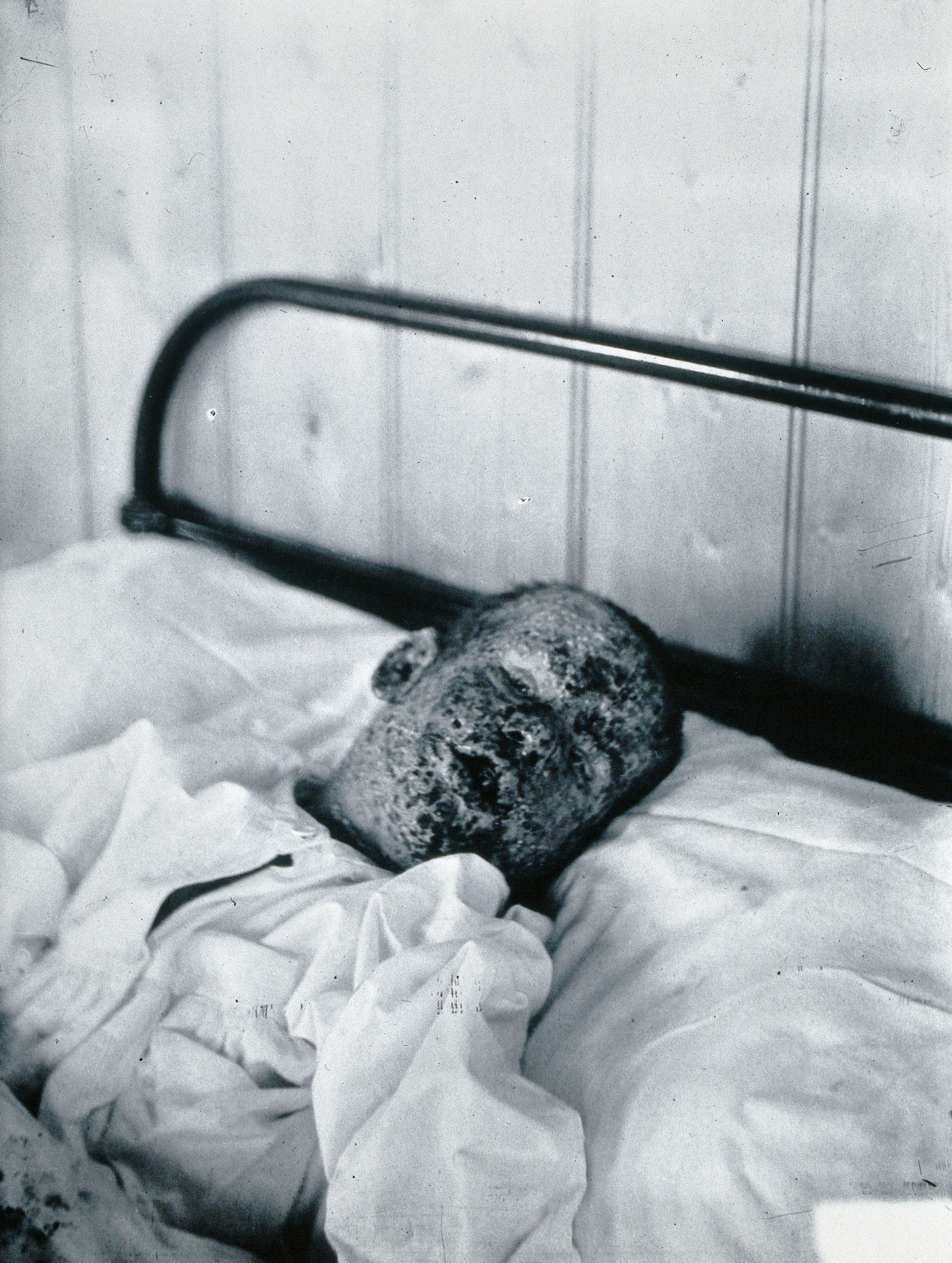
- Henry Wicklin, age 6, afflicted with smallpox
- Disease: Smallpox
- Location: Gloucester, UK
- Confirmed cases: Over 2,000

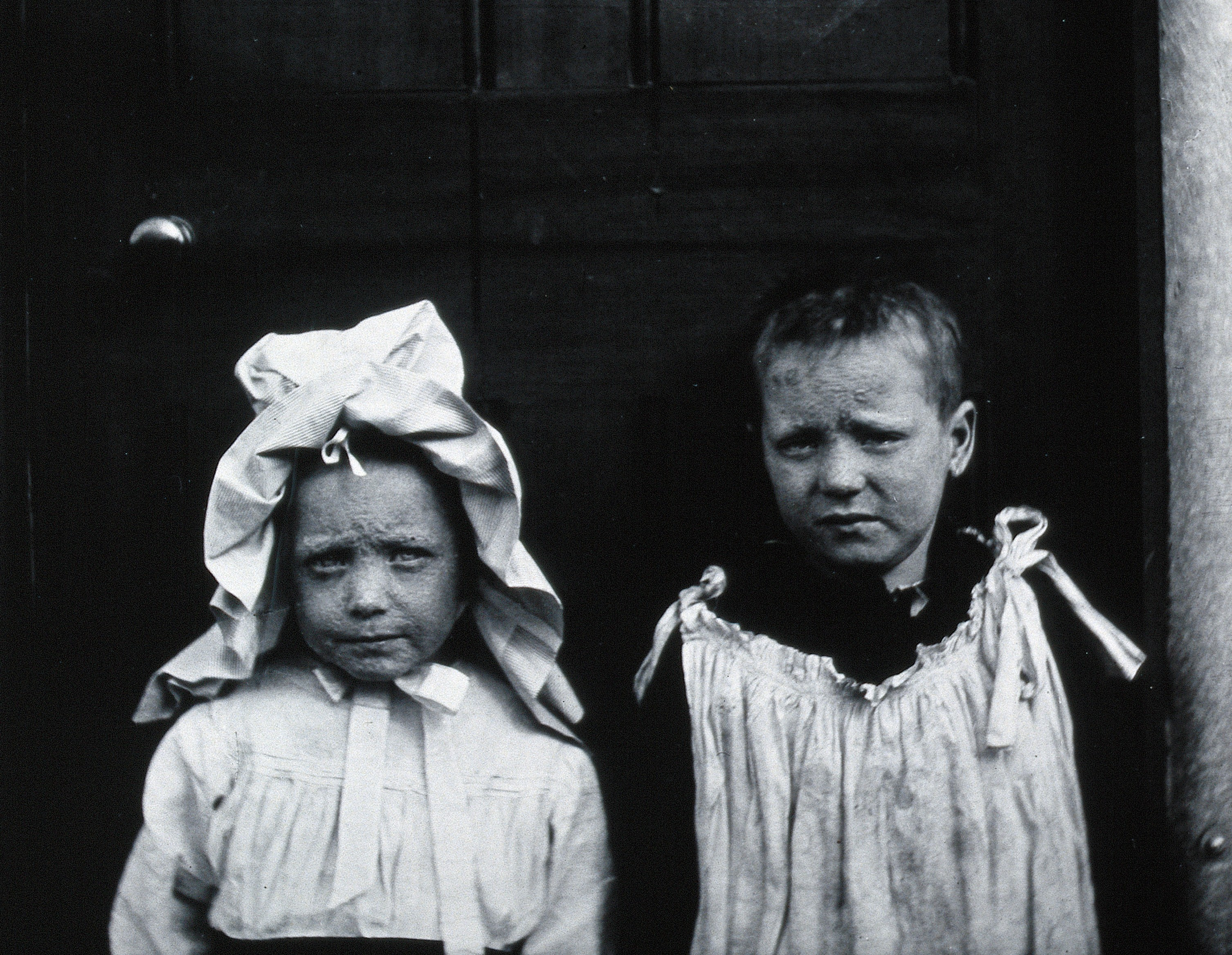
Gloucester smallpox epidemic, 1896 Wellcome V0031469

The 1896 Gloucester smallpox epidemic affected more than 2,000 people in Gloucester between five January and 27 July 1896. A large number of the town's population were not vaccinated.

On 13 August 1896, the Royal Commission on Vaccination's report on the epidemic was published by the Royal College of Surgeons of England.

== Background ==
In Britain, smallpox vaccination became compulsory in the 1850s. In Gloucester, a smallpox outbreak occurred in the mid-1870s. However, the 1890s also saw anti-vaccination beliefs.

== Cases ==
President of the Local Government Board Thomas Russell stated in 1896 that, between 4 January and 25 July 1896, the number of cases of smallpox in Gloucester totalled 2,008. A large number of the town's population were not vaccinated.

=== Ethel Cromwell ===
Ethel Cromwell was around 14 years old when her photograph was taken in a hospital in Gloucester, following admission with smallpox. She was not vaccinated, but recovered.

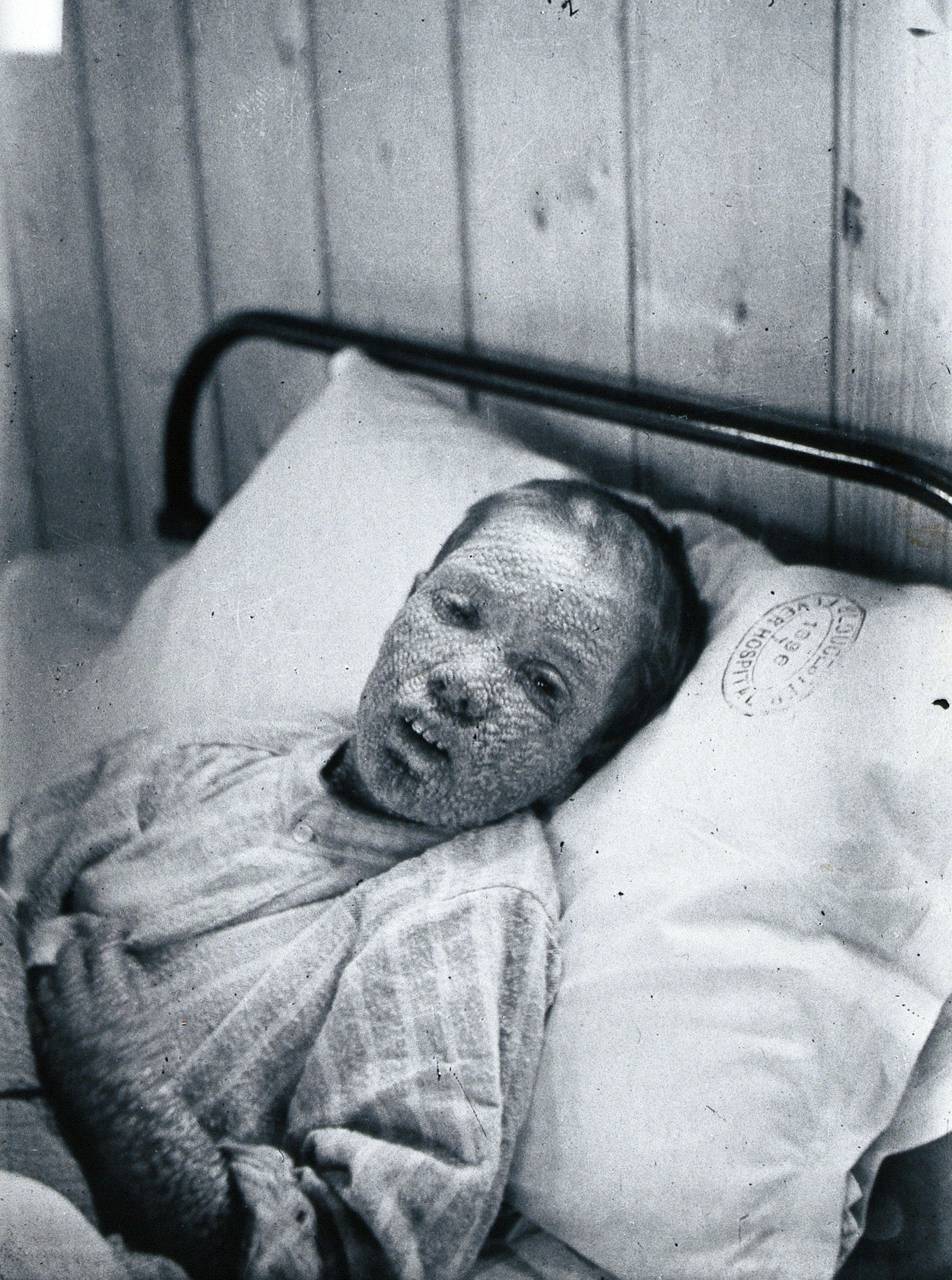
Ethel Cromwell (with smallpox)

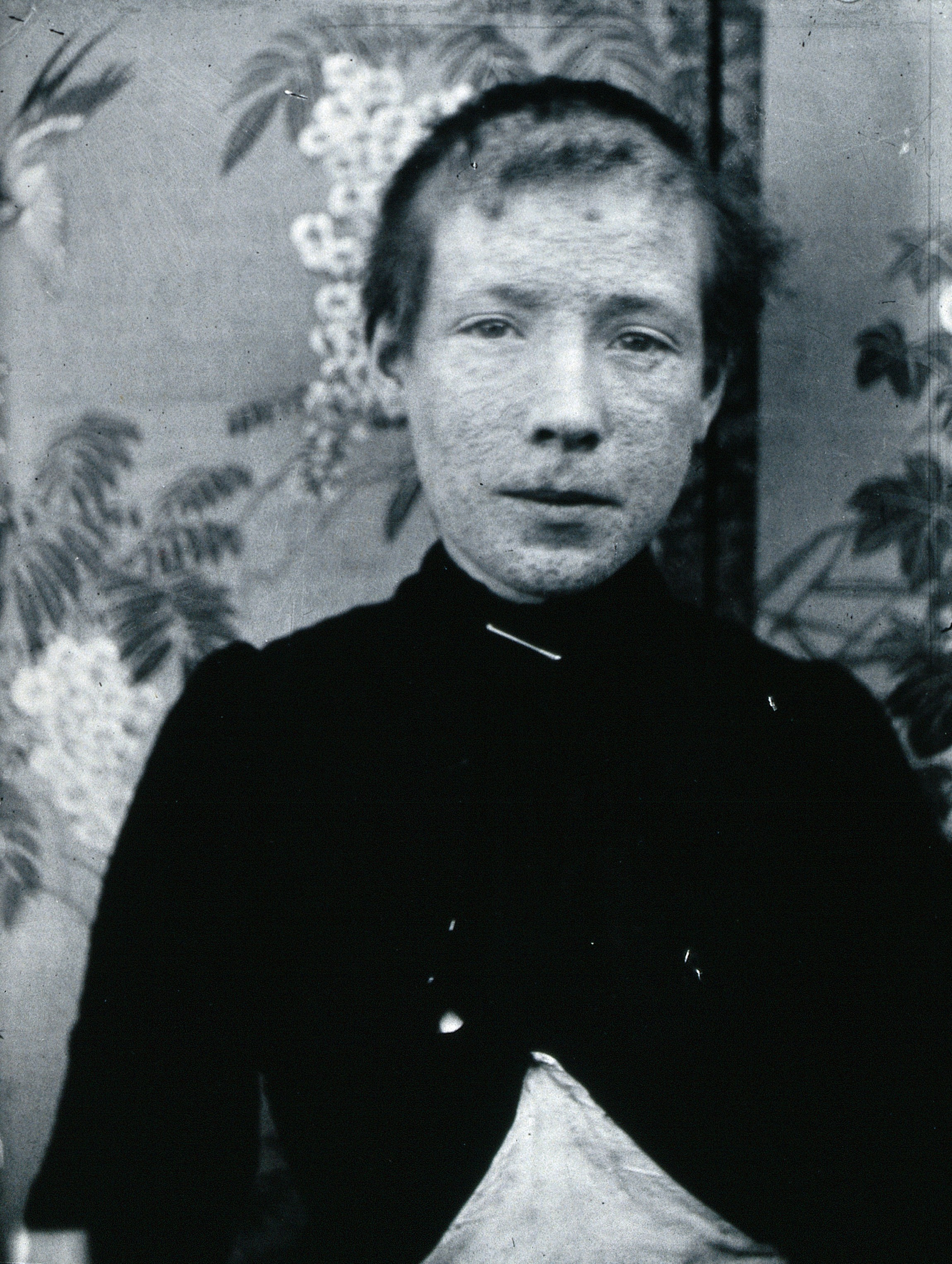
Ethel Cromwell (convalescing)

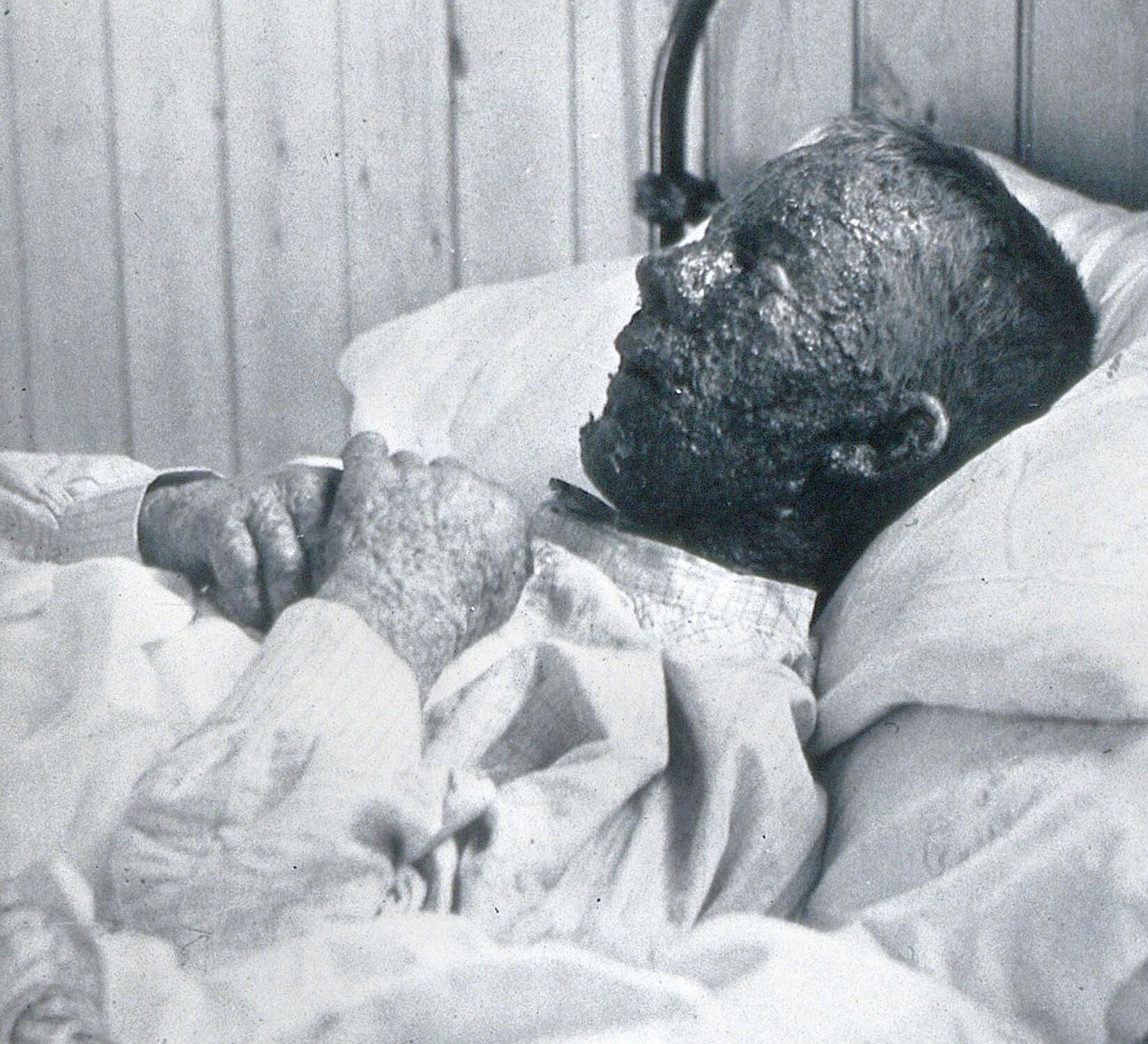
Ephraim Beard with smallpox. Died on 13 April 1896

== Response ==
An isolation hospital, the Stroud Road hospital was built in response. One reaction was that it led to prejudice against Gloucesterians. On 13 August 1896, the Royal College of Surgeons of England published a report by the Royal Commission on Vaccination, whose members included Lord Herschell and Sir James Paget. A subsequent outbreak of smallpox occurred in 1923.

== See also ==
- Walter Hadwen
