= The Premature Burial =

Short story by Edgar Allan Poe

- Short story by Edgar Allan Poe, (1809–1849)
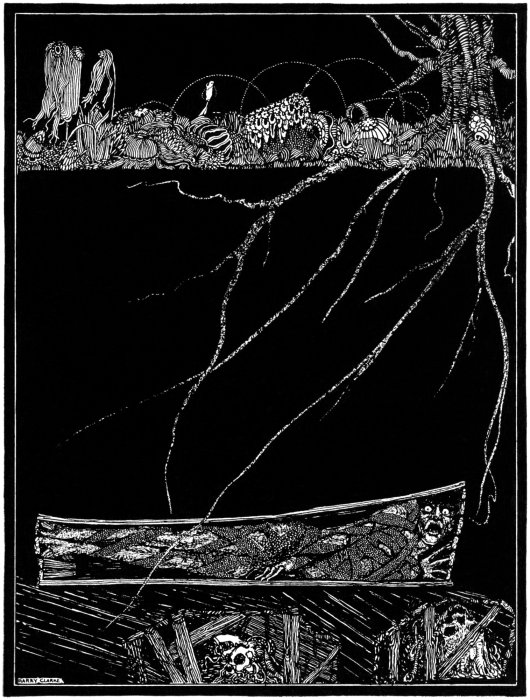
- Illustration for "The Premature Burial" by Harry Clarke, 1919
- Country: United States
- Language: English
- Genre: Horror short story

Publication
- Published in: The Philadelphia Dollar Newspaper
- Publication type: Periodical
- Media type: Print
- Publication date: July 31, 1844

"The Premature Burial" is a horror short story by American writer Edgar Allan Poe, published in 1844 in The Philadelphia Dollar Newspaper. Its main character expresses fear about being buried alive. This fear was common in this period and Poe was taking advantage of the public interest.

== Plot ==
In "The Premature Burial", the first-person unnamed narrator describes his struggle with "attacks of the singular disorder which physicians have agreed to term catalepsy", a condition where he randomly falls into a death-like trance. This leads to his fear of being buried alive ("The true wretchedness", he says, is "to be buried while alive"). He emphasizes his fear by mentioning several people who have been buried alive. In the first case, the tragic accident was only discovered much later, when the victim's crypt was reopened. In others, victims revived and were able to draw attention to themselves in time to be freed from their ghastly prisons.

The narrator reviews these examples in order to provide context for his nearly crippling phobia of being buried alive. As he explains, his condition made him prone to slipping into a trance state of unconsciousness, a disease that grew progressively worse over time. He became obsessed with the idea that he would fall into such a state while away from home, and that his state would be mistaken for death. He extracts promises from his friends that they will not bury him prematurely, refuses to leave his home, and builds an elaborate tomb with equipment allowing him to signal for help in case he should awaken after "death".

The story culminates when the narrator awakens in pitch darkness in a confined area. He presumes he has been buried alive, and all his precautions were to no avail. He cries out and is immediately hushed; he quickly realizes that he is in the berth of a small boat, not a grave. The event shocks him out of his obsession with death, and soon after, his catalepsy episodes cease entirely, leading him to suspect that they were a symptom of his phobia, rather than a cause.

== Publication history ==
"The Premature Burial" first appeared in the July 31, 1844, issue of The Philadelphia Dollar Newspaper. The story was republished in The Broadway Journal in the June 14, 1845 issue with alterations. Ten paragraphs of the story as "Burying Alive” were reprinted in the August 1844 issue of The Rover in New York. The story appeared in the April 16, 1845 issue of the Boston Cultivator, the June 19-20, 1845 issue of the Charleston Mercury in Charleston, South Carolina, excerpted in the July 8 and 9, 1845 issues of the Boston Daily Mail, and in full in the June 11, 1851 issue of Odd Fellow in Boston.

== Analysis ==
Fear of burial alive was deeply rooted in Western culture in the nineteenth century, and Poe was taking advantage of the public's fascination with it. Hundreds of cases were reported in which doctors mistakenly pronounced people dead. In this period, coffins occasionally were equipped with emergency devices to allow the "corpse" to call for help, should he or she turn out to be still living. It was such a strong concern, Victorians even organized a Society for the Prevention of People Being Buried Alive. Belief in the vampire, an animated corpse that remains in its grave by day and emerges to prey on the living at night, has sometimes been attributed to premature burial. Folklorist Paul Barber has argued that the incidence of burial alive has been overestimated, and that the normal effects of decomposition are mistaken for signs of life. The story emphasizes this fascination by having the narrator state that truth can be more terrifying than fiction, then reciting actual cases in order to convince the reader to believe the main story.

The narrator in "The Premature Burial" is living a hollow life. He has avoided reality through his catalepsy but also through his fantasies, visions, and obsession with death. He does, however, reform—but only after his greatest fear has been realized.

=== Burial while alive in other Poe works ===
- "Berenice"
- "The Cask of Amontillado"
- "The Fall of the House of Usher"
- "Ligeia"
- "Morella"

== Adaptations ==
- The Crime of Dr. Crespi (1935), starring famous silent film director and occasional actor later in "talkies" Erich von Stroheim released by Republic Pictures.
- The Premature Burial (1962) is a Roger Corman film starring Ray Milland, Hazel Court, Alan Napier, and Heather Angel.
- A novelization of the 1962 Roger Corman film was written by Max Hallan Danne in 1962, adapted from Charles Beaumont and Ray Russell's screenplay and published by Lancer Books in paperback.
- In 1961 the TV series Thriller – starring Boris Karloff – featured their own version of "The Premature Burial", written by William D. Gordan and Douglas Heyes and guest starring Patricia Medina, Sidney Blackmer and Scott Marlowe.
- Gothic soap-opera television series: Dark Shadows (1966–71), incorporated "The Premature Burial" into its narrative along with "The Tell-Tale Heart", "The Cask of Amontillado" and "The Pit and the Pendulum". A subsequent movie was made in 2012 based on a revival and re-telling of the saga of the old TV series.
- The film Nightmares from the Mind of Poe (2006) includes adaptations of "The Premature Burial" along with "The Tell-Tale Heart", "The Cask of Amontillado" and "The Raven".
- Jan Švankmajer's film Lunacy (2005) is based on "The Premature Burial" and Poe's "The System of Doctor Tarr and Professor Fether".
- The Fred Olen Ray film Haunting Fear (1991) starring Brinke Stevens is loosely based on "The Premature Burial". The onscreen credits actually call the movie "Edgar Allan Poe's Haunting Fear" despite significant differences with the original 1844 Poe story, including being set in the present day, the main character being female, and ending with her being intentionally put inside a coffin with the purpose of scaring her to death.
- ERS Game studio released a PC adventure game based on the story called Dark Tales: Edgar Allan Poe's The Premature Burial Collector's Edition.
- The CBS Radio Mystery Theater adapted the story into a radio play in 1975 hosted by E. G. Marshall and starring Keir Dullea.
