= Vilvoorde =

Vilvoorde: Vilvorde (French)
- City and municipality
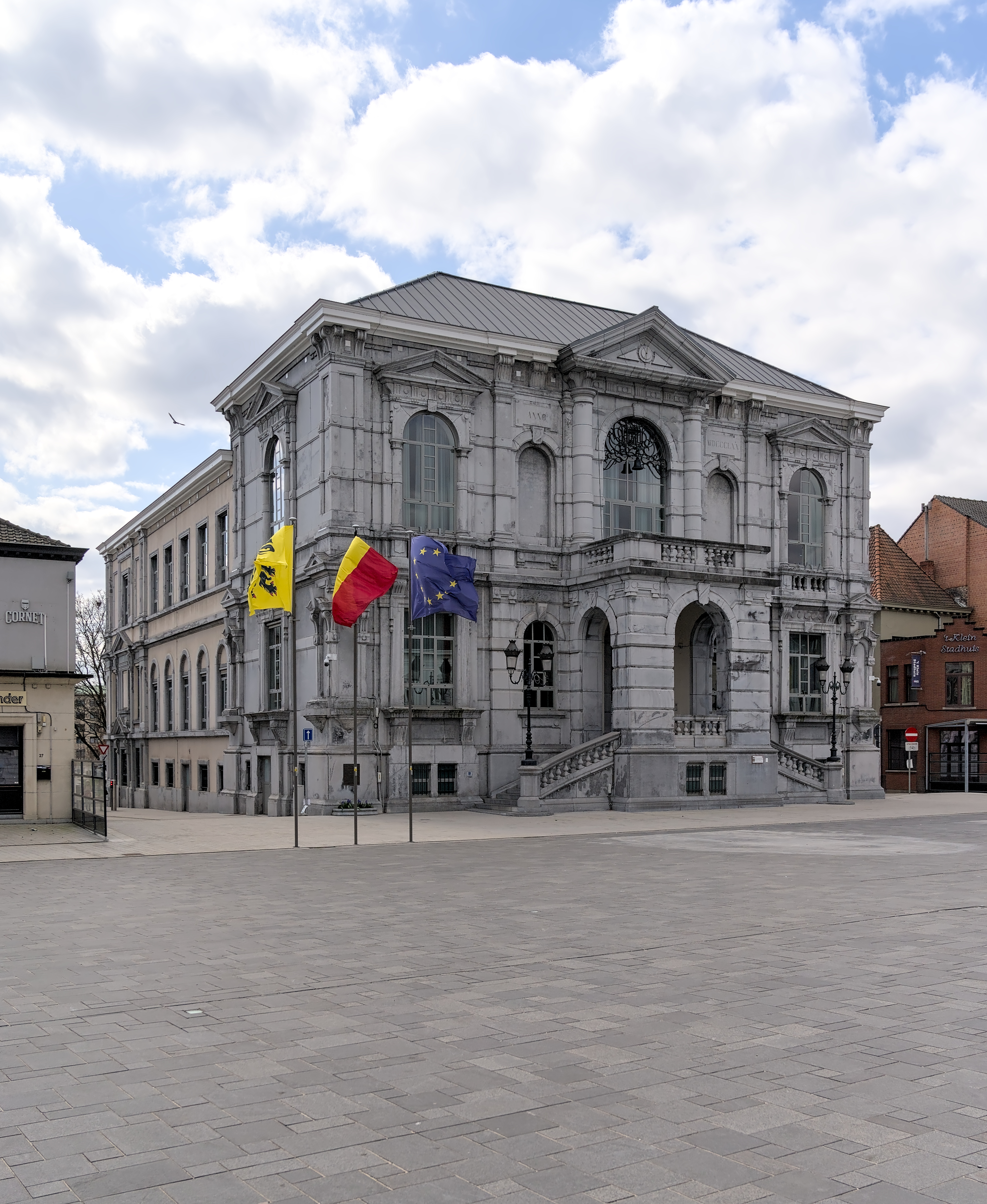
- Town Hall

- Flag Coat of arms

- Location of Vilvoorde in Flemish Brabant
- Interactive map of Vilvoorde
- Location in Belgium
- Coordinates: 50°56′N 04°25′E
- Country: Belgium
- Community: Flemish Community
- Region: Flemish Region
- Province: Flemish Brabant
- Arrondissement: Halle Vilvoorde

Government
  - Mayor: Jo De Ro (Open Vid)
  - Governing parties: Vooruit, Open Vld, CD&V, Groen

Area
  - Total: 21.57 km^{2} (8.33 sq mi)

Population (2018-01-01)
  - Total: 44,015
  - Density: 2,041/km^{2} (5,285/sq mi)
- Postal codes: 1800
- NIS code: 23088
- Area codes: 02 - 015
- Website: www.vilvoorde.be

Vilvoorde (Dutch pronunciation: [ˈvɪlvoːrdə]; West Flemish: Vilvôorde; French: Vilvorde [vilvɔʁd]; historically known as Filford in English) is a municipality and city in the Halle-Vilvoorde district (arrondissement) of the province of Flemish Brabant, Belgium. The municipality comprises the city of Vilvoorde proper with its two outlying quarters of Koningslo and Houtem and the small town of Peutie.

The official language of Vilvoorde is Dutch, as in the rest of Flanders. There is a French-speaking minority of about 33.7%, concentrated especially in the Koningslo and Beauval quarters, bordering the Neder-Over-Heembeek neighbourhood of Brussels. The French-speaking minority is represented by 3 members on the 33-seat local council.

From 2000 until August 1, 2007, the mayor of Vilvoorde was former Belgian prime minister Jean-Luc Dehaene. The mayor from 2013 to 2024 was Hans Bonte, also a member of the Federal House of Representatives.

== History ==
=== Origins ===
The Nervii, and later the Romans, probably already settled in this strategic place near the river Zenne. The name Filfurdo was first mentioned in a 779 document whereby Pippin of Herstal ceded this territory to the Abbey of Chèvremont, near Liège. This name presumably derived from the word equivalents villa at the ford or river crossing.

=== Middle Ages ===
In the 12th century, a small town started to grow, which quickly became a target for the ambitions of the dukes of Brabant and lords of Grimbergen. Henry I, Duke of Brabant granted the city its charter of rights as soon as 1192, mainly to ensure the support of the inhabitants against powerful neighbouring Flanders. The rights to build defensive walls and to export its products gave Vilvoorde a great economic boost, driven mostly by the cloth industry. In the 14th century, thanks to its position on the Zenne, Vilvoorde became an important military centre and could compete against Leuven and Brussels for the title of most important city in Brabant.

=== 15th–18th centuries ===
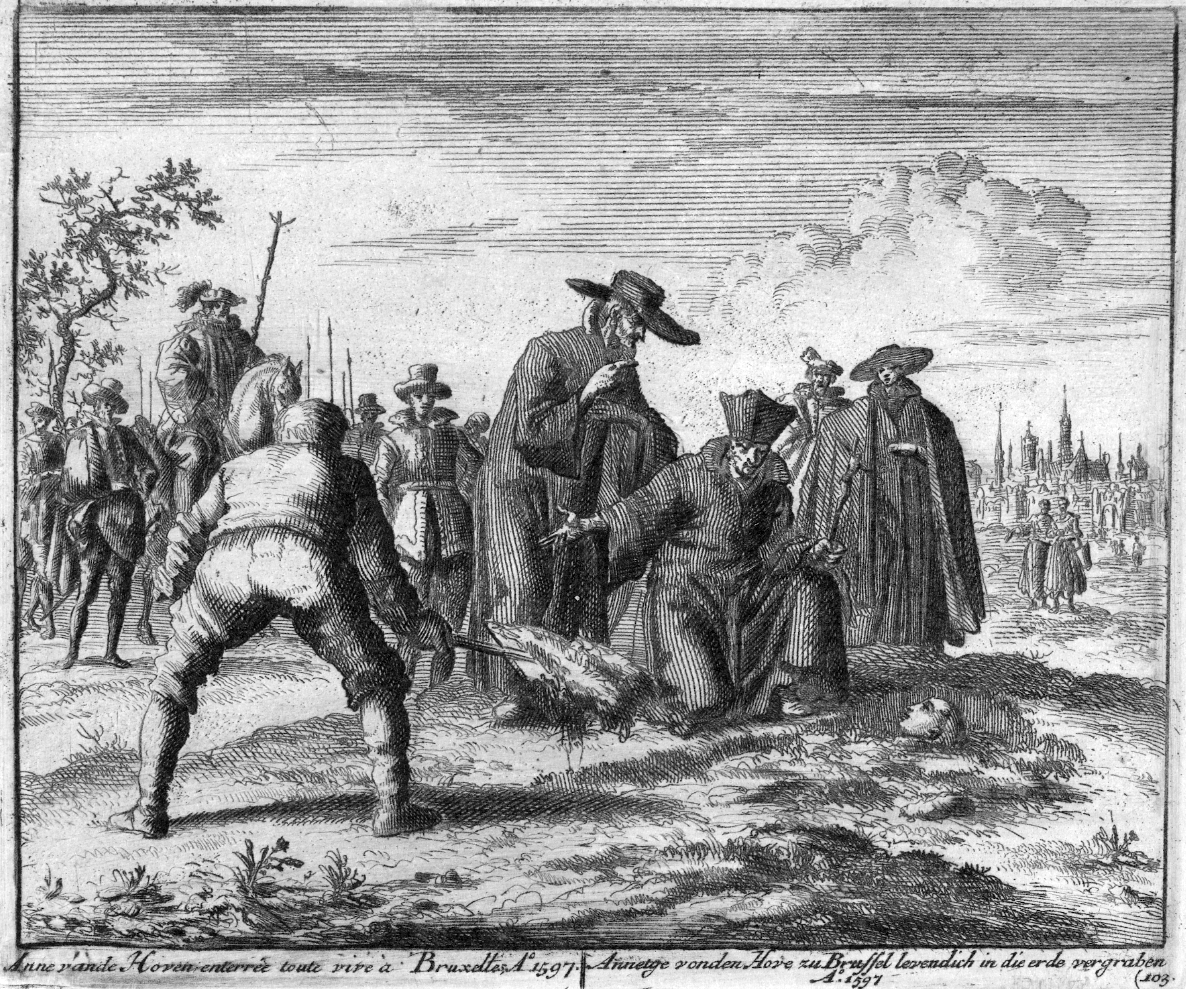
Jan Luyken's etching (made around 1683–1685) depicting the Anabaptist Anna Utenhoven being buried alive at Vilvoorde in 1597. In the drawing, her head is still above the ground and the priest is exhorting her to recant her faith, while the executioner stands ready to completely cover her up upon her refusal

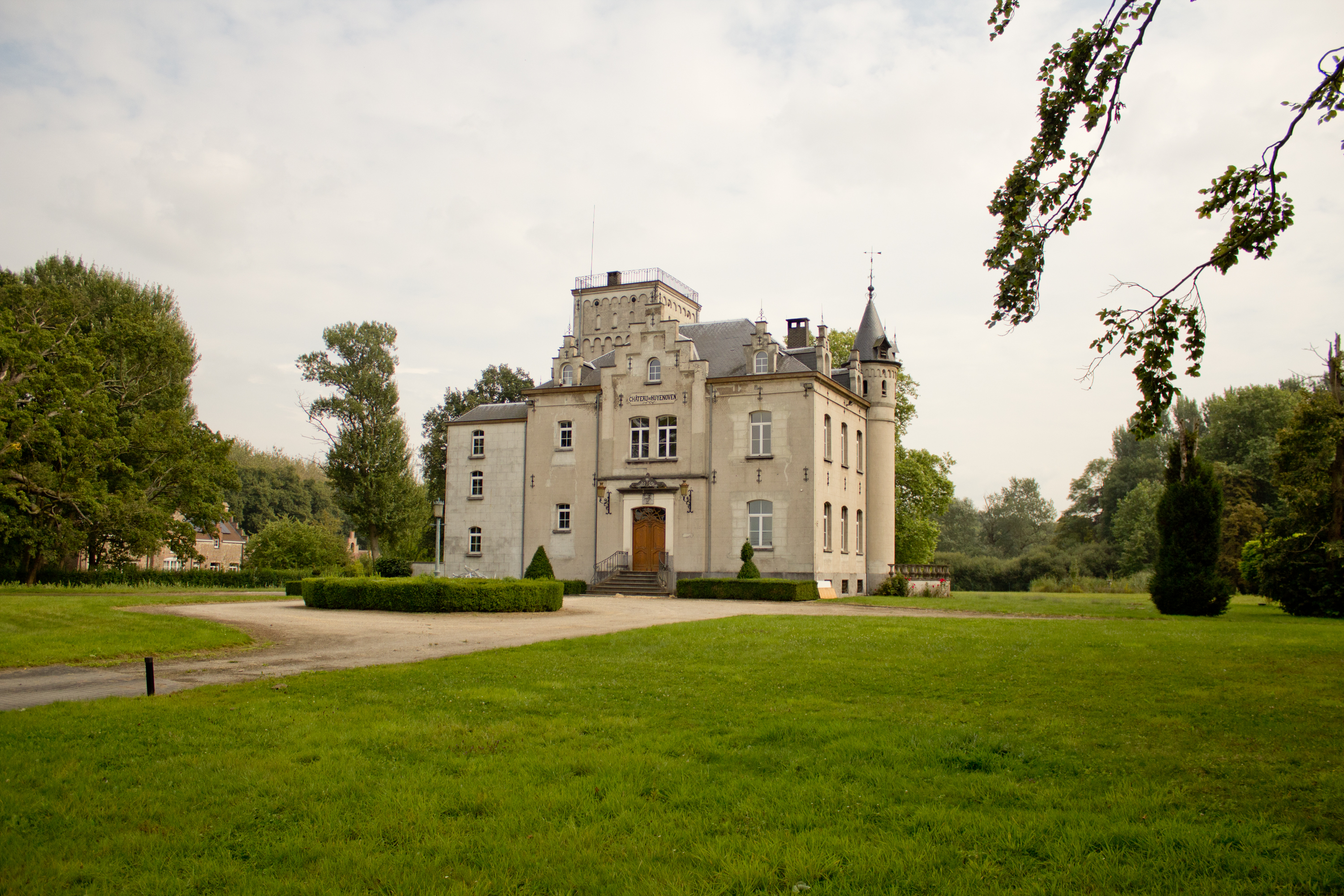
Castle Hyenhoven in Peutie, a borough of Vilvoorde

From the 15th to the 18th century, however, Vilvoorde suffered a prolonged decline, mainly because of the competition from Brussels, a general malaise in the textile industry, and the result of epidemics and wars, both political and religious.

The translator of the Bible into English, William Tyndale, was executed here in October 1536. In 1597 Anna Utenhoven, an Anabaptist accused of heresy, was buried alive in Vilvoorde – the last of the Protestants suffering martyrdom for their faith in the history of the Habsburg Netherlands. Anthony van Stralen, Lord of Merksem and Jan van Casembroot were also both executed in Vilvoorde.

=== 19th century and beyond ===
The advent of the Industrial Revolution in the late 18th century was a godsend to Vilvoorde, which could quickly capitalize on its proximity to Brussels and its good transportation infrastructure: the deepening of the canals around 1830 and the advent of the railways in 1835. Soon, the medieval buildings gave way to newer and better constructions. The 1489 city hall was replaced by the neoclassical building we see today.

In the 1920s, the canal was broadened and deepened again, lined with new industrial zones, and an inland port was built to receive the freightliners. Following its liberation by the British in 1944, Vilvoorde was administered by a joint British and Belgian municipality, with temporary British and Belgian Mayors, Lt Col (then Major) JME Howarth Esq and (Later Prof.) Robert Senelle, before transferring back to a civilian administration.

Vilvoorde became (and still is) one of the largest industrial areas around Brussels, with a population that grew to five times what it was 150 years earlier. The recent economic crises have hit the city hard, especially when Renault closed its doors in 1997. The service industry is now taking the lead in 21st-century Vilvoorde.

The 1st Fusilier Battalion was established in Peutie on June 10, 2026, as part of the recent expansion and strengthening of the Belgian Army.

== Local government ==
Mayors of Vilvoorde:

- 1983–1993: Laurent Moyson (CVP)
- 1994–2000: Willy Cortois (VLD)
- 2001–2007: Jean-Luc Dehaene (CD&V)
- 2007–2012: Marc Van Asch (CD&V)
- 2013–2024: Hans Bonte (SP.A)
- since 2025: Jo De Ro (Open Vid)

== Sights ==
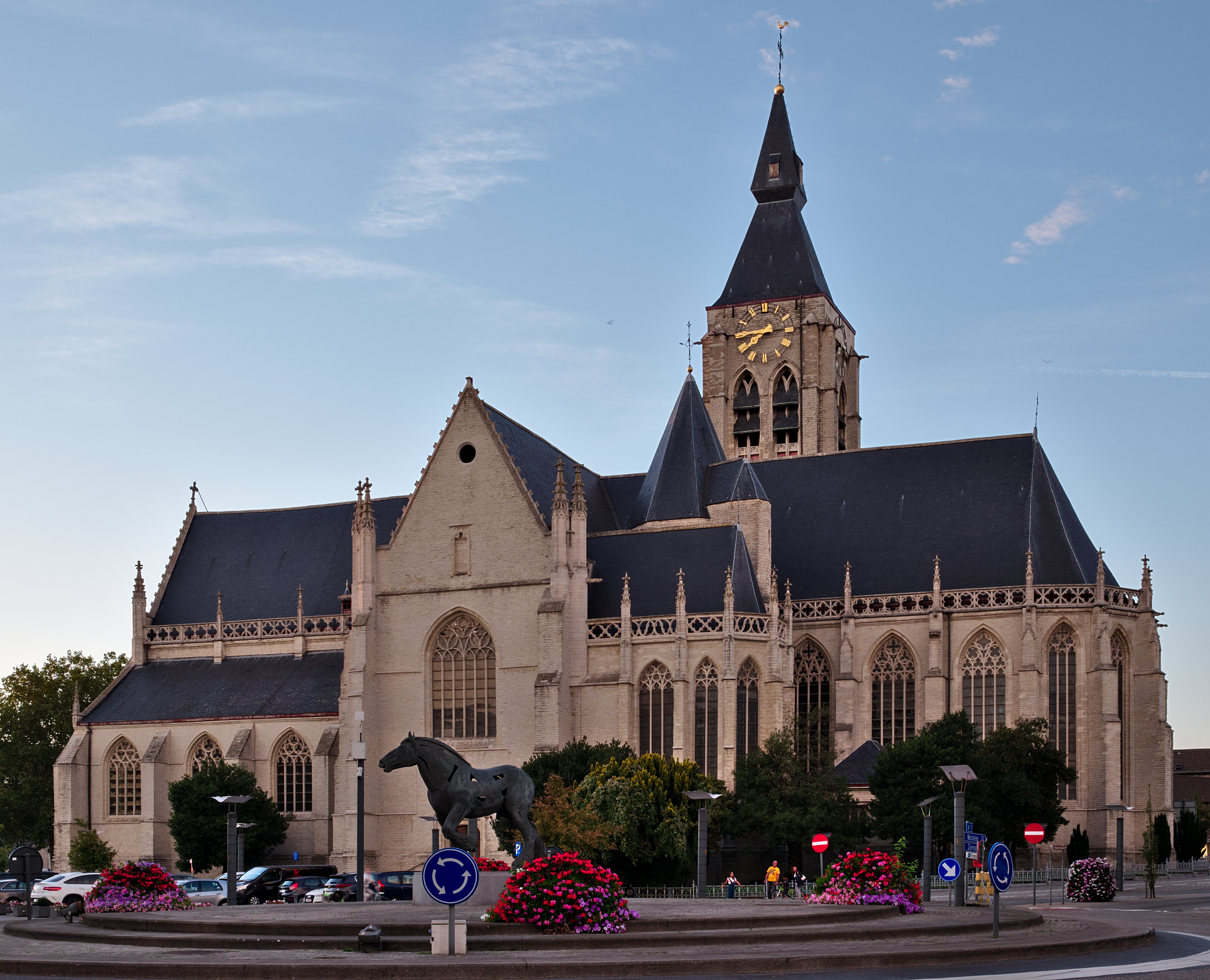
Onze-Lieve-Vrouwe-Kerk, Vilvoorde

- The neoclassical city hall and a covered market hall can be found on the main city square.
- The statue of a Brabant horse by Rik Poot can be found near the church, commemorating the long tradition of horse trading in Vilvoorde.
- The Kijk-Uit house dates from the 15th or 16th century.
- The city also has interesting churches, including the Onze-Lieve-Vrouwekerk (Church of Our Lady) that was started in the 14th century, and the basilica of Onze-Lieve-Vrouw-ten-Troost (Our Lady of Consolation), built in the 17th-century Baroque style and adjoining the cloister of the Carmelites.
- Vilvoorde also has its fair share of parks, such as the Hanssenspark with English gardens and the Domein Drie Fonteinen (the "Domain of the Three Fountains"), which boasts both English and French gardens.
- The Vilvoorde Viaduct, part of the Brussels beltway.

== Events ==
- Like many other Belgian cities, Vilvoorde has a week-long carnival, which takes place every year in the week of Shrove Tuesday (end of February – beginning of March).
- Every year, on the Monday three weeks after Easter, a very popular yearly market ("jaarmarkt") is held which features several competitions and exhibitions of farm animals (horses, cows, poultry, ...), and which coincides with the start of the yearly, week-long fair featuring plenty of attractions for children.

== Demographics ==
43% of residents in Vilvoorde were born abroad, as of 2015, and 44.89% of residents are non-European, predominantly of Arab and African origin.

The city is also home to a large Spanish minority. There is also a large Moroccan community, and many smaller communities of more recent immigrants including Turks, Macedonians and Portuguese.

Group of origin	Year	
Group of origin	2023	
Group of origin	Number	%
Belgians with Belgian background	18,159	38.64%
Belgians with foreign background	21,416	45.57%
Neighboring country	1,023	2.18%
EU27 (excluding neighboring country)	2,490	5.3%
Outside EU 27	17,903	38.1%
Non-Belgians	7,418	15.79%
Neighboring country	888	1.89%
EU27 (excluding neighboring country)	3,339	7.11%
Outside EU 27	3,191	6.79%
Total	46,993	100%

== Notable people ==
- Jancko Douwama, a Frisian nobleman who fought to free Friesland from Saxon rule, was imprisoned by the Emperor Charles V in Vilvoorde castle from 1523 until his death in 1533
- Jan van Essen and Hendrik Vos (died 1523), shortly before becoming the first Lutherans executed by the Roman Catholic Church, were imprisoned in Vilvoorde in 1523
- William Tyndale (1494–1536), English scholar and Bible translator, was strangled and burnt in Vilvoorde
- Jean-François Portaels (1818–1895), orientalist painter
- Jean-Luc Dehaene (1940–2014), politician, Prime Minister in 1992–1999
- Danny Devos (born 1959), artist working in body art and performance art
- Francis Heylighen (born 1960), scientist researching complex systems
- Pascal Duquenne (born 1970), actor
- Yannick Carrasco (born 1993) footballer; raised in Vilvoorde
- Jan Baptist van Helmont (1580–1644), pioneer of chemistry
- Paul Panda Farnana (1888–1930), Congolese intellectual and activist
- Amelie Lens (born 1990), DJ and producer
- Veronique Branquinho (born 1973), fashion designer
- Magda Goebbels (1901–1945), wife of Joseph Goebbels; enrolled at the Ursuline Convent in Vilvoorde

== Twin towns – sister cities ==
Vilvoorde is twinned with:

- Ennepetal, Germany
- Komatsu, Japan
- Maubeuge, France
- Middelburg, Netherlands
- Peñarroya-Pueblonuevo, Spain

== See also ==
- Brussels-Halle-Vilvoorde electoral district
