= Eduard Henke =

German jurist and criminologist (1783–1869)

- Born: Hermann Wilhelm Eduard Henke; 28 September 1783; Braunschweig, Lower Saxony
- Died: 14 March 1869; Braunschweig, Lower Saxony
- Known for: Handbook on Criminal Law and Criminal Politics (Handbuch des Criminalrechts und der Criminalpolitik)
- Title: Numerous professorships and court roles

Academic background
- Education: University of Göttingen; University of Helmstedt; University of Erlangen

Academic work
- Discipline: Law; Jurisprudence; Criminology
- Institutions: University of Landshut; Court of Nuremberg; University of Bern; Court of Wolfenbüttel; University of Halle

Hermann Wilhelm Eduard Henke (28 September 1783 – 14 March 1869) was a German jurist and criminologist. He was professor of law at the universities of Landshut, Bern, and Halle.

== Early life ==
Eduard Henke's family produced numerous doctors, lawyers, theologians and artists. He was born on 28 September 1783 in Braunschweig, Lower Saxony, the ninth child of pastor Ernst Heinrich Ludwig Henke (1736–1785) and Wilhelmine Henke, née Spohr (1744–1806). Of his older brothers, Theodor Henke (1765–1843) became general superintendent of Braunschweig and Adolph Henke (1775–1843) professor of physiology and pathology at the University of Erlangen. His nephew was the composer Louis Spohr (1784–1859).

== Education and career ==
Henke studied law at the universities of Göttingen and Helmstedt. In 1806, he received his doctorate (Dr. Jur.) from Helmstedt with the dissertation De Vera Criminis Laesae Maiestatis Secundum Leges Positivas Indole Atque Poena. In the same year, he completed his habilitation at the University of Erlangen. Henke was appointed associate professor of law at the University of Landshut in 1808, and Nuremberg city court assessor in 1813.

From 1814 to 1832 Henke was professor of Roman law and criminal law at the University of Bern. In 1832, he was an appellate judge in Wolfenbüttel for one year. In 1833, he became full professor of law at the University of Halle, and in the same year was awarded the title of Secret Judiciary Council. He worked at the University of Halle until 1857.

== Writings ==
Henke wrote numerous specialist publications. In 1809 he published on "common penal law in Germany". In 1811 he published a book on theories of criminal law, and his textbook on criminal law was completed in 1815. His main work, Handbook on Criminal Law and Criminal Politics (Handbuch des Criminalrechts und der Criminalpolitik), was published in four volumes from 1823 to 1838. The Handbook focussed on foreign legislation. Some of his monographs were reprinted in the 1990s as part of the series "Library of German Criminal Law (Masters of Modernism)". Henke also worked as a translator from French and English.

== Personal life ==
His daughter Amélie Henke (1827–1921) married Rudolf Leuckart (1822–1898), the zoologist and parasitologist.

== Death ==
Henke died aged 85 on March 14, 1869 in his native city of Braunschweig.

== Selected publications ==
- De Vera Criminis Laesae Maiestatis Secundum Leges Positivas Indole Atque Poena. (dissertation). Helmstedt, 1806. (Online.)
- Criminological essays (Criminalistische Versuche). Berlin, 1807. (Online.)
- Foundations of a history of German penal law and its study. An essay (Grundriß einer Geschichte des deutschen peinlichen Rechts und der peinlichen Rechtswissenschaft. Ein Versuch). (2 vols.) Vol 1: Berlin, 1807; vol 2: Sulzbach, 1809. (Online, vol. 1) (Online, vol. 2)
- On the dispute between the theories of criminal law. An attempt at their reconciliation, featuring a literary supplement (Ueber den Streit der Strafrechtstheorien. Ein Versuch zu ihrer Versöhnung nebst einer literarischen Beilage). Regensburg, 1811. (Online.)
- Contributions to criminal legislation through a comparative review of the latest books and studies on criminal law (Beyträge zur Criminalgesetzgebung in einer vergleichenden Uebersicht der neuesten Strafgesetz-Bücher und Entwürfe). Regensburg, 1813. (Online.)
- On the nature of jurisprudence and its study in Germany (Ueber das Wesen der Rechtswissenschaft und das Studium derselben in Deutschland). Regensburg, 1814. (Online.)
- Description of the judicial proceedings in criminal cases (Darstellung des gerichtlichen Verfahrens in Strafsachen). Zürich, 1817.
- Handbook on Criminal Law and Criminal Politics (Handbuch des Criminalrechts und der Criminalpolitik). (4 vols.) Berlin, 1823-1803. (Online, vol. 1) (Online, vol. 2) (Online, vol. 3) (Online, vol. 4)
- Public law of the Swiss Confederation and Swiss cantons. Featuring basic features of general constitutional law (Oeffentliches Recht der Schweizerischen Eid-Genossenschaft und der Kantone der Schweiz. Nebst Grundzügen des allgemeinen Staatsrechts). Aarau, 1824. (Online.)
