= Anna Utenhoven =

Anabaptist martyr in the Spanish Netherlands

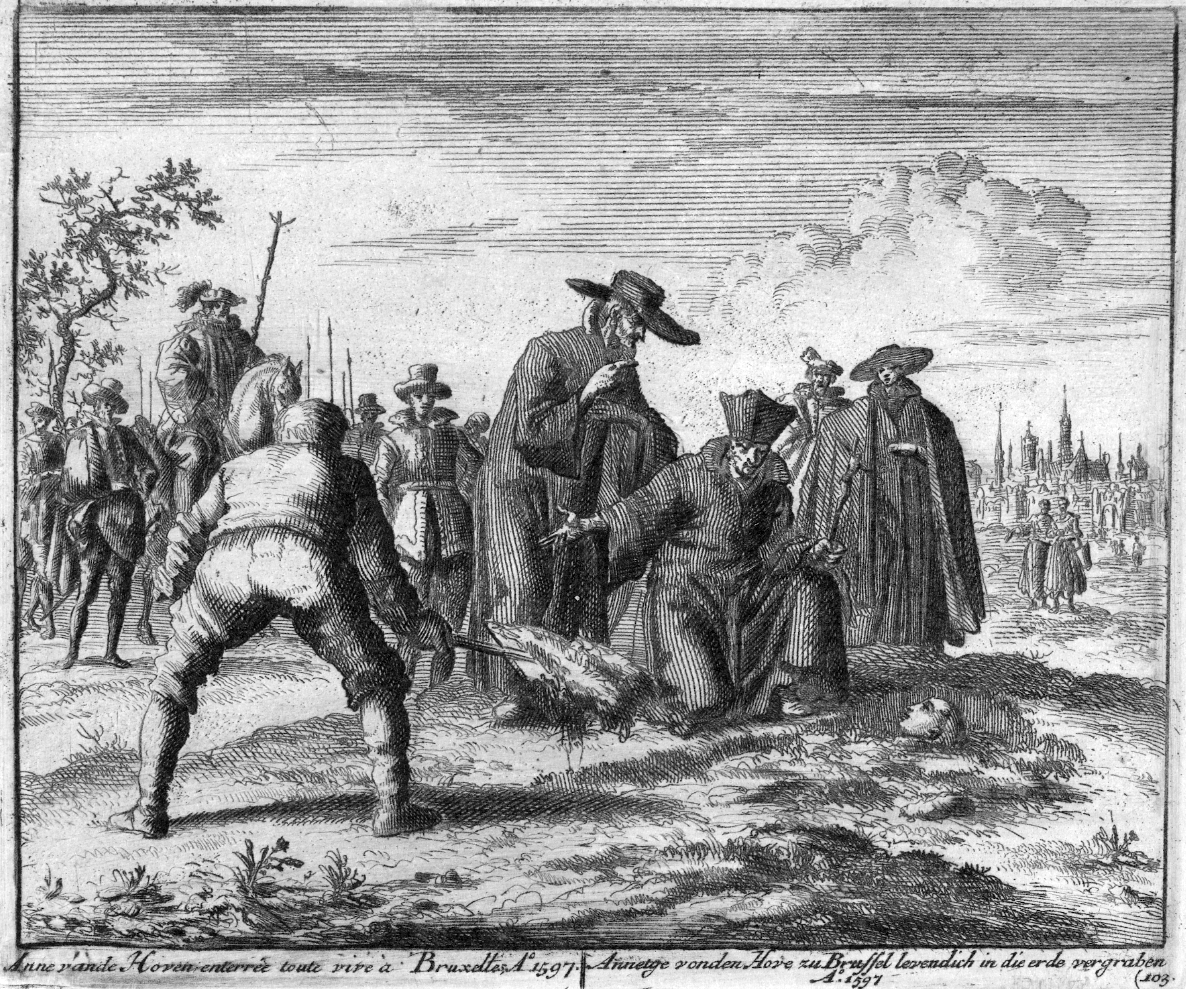
Jan Luyken's drawing of Utenhoven being buried alive at Vilvoorde in 1597. In the drawing, her head is still above the ground and the priest exhorts her to recant her faith while the executioner stands ready to completely cover her up upon her refusal.

Anna Utenhoven (sometimes Anneken van den Hove or Anna uyt den Hove, 1552 – 17 July 1597) was an Anabaptist woman in the Spanish Netherlands who was martyred for her faith. She was buried alive in 1597, the last person executed for heresy in the Low Countries.

== History ==
In the late 1580s, Utenhoven worked as a servant for the two Rampart sisters in Brussels. She did not attend mass or confession, and the parish priest concluded that she was an Anabaptist or associated with the Family of Love, both of which were considered heresy.

As Utenhoven declined to recant her religious beliefs, which were illegal under Catholic Habsburg rule, the priest ordered the civil authorities from the Council of Brabant to arrest her on 21 December 1594. An ecclesiastical court found her guilty, and condemned her to death by burial, the punishment prescribed for female heretics, which had not been used since the 1570s. She was held in the Treurenberch, the Council of Brabant's prison. Archbishop Mathias Hovius, who was appointed in February 1596, was committed to protecting Catholicism in the mixed-faith Spanish Netherlands, and he visited Utenhoven to convince her to recant. Hovius worried that she spread heretical ideas in prison, and her stay must be ended either through her conversion or her death.

In March 1597, Albert VII, governor of the Spanish Netherlands, wrote a letter to the Council of Brabant and urged Utenhoven's execution. In July 1597, she was visited by Jesuits, who asked her to convert to Catholicism and be freed. She refused and also declined their offer of a further six months to make up her mind.

She was buried alive on 17 July, 1597. During the burial, she was given repeated chances to recant her faith and be freed, but she refused each time.

The execution was very unpopular in the Dutch Republic and inspired anger towards the regime. Utenhoven was the last person executed for heresy in the Low Countries, and in 1609, the punishment for heresy was changed to exile. She is the subject of the 1598 poem De uytspraecke van Anna vyt den Hove by the Dutch poet Jacobus Viverius, which served as a rallying cry to the Dutch against the Spanish control of the Southern Netherlands.Viverius used Utenhoven's death to argue that the Spanish could not be negotiated with to prevent the Dutch Republic's Estates General from negotiating an end to the Dutch War of Independence.
