= Arthur Moreland (artist) =

British artist and cartoonist

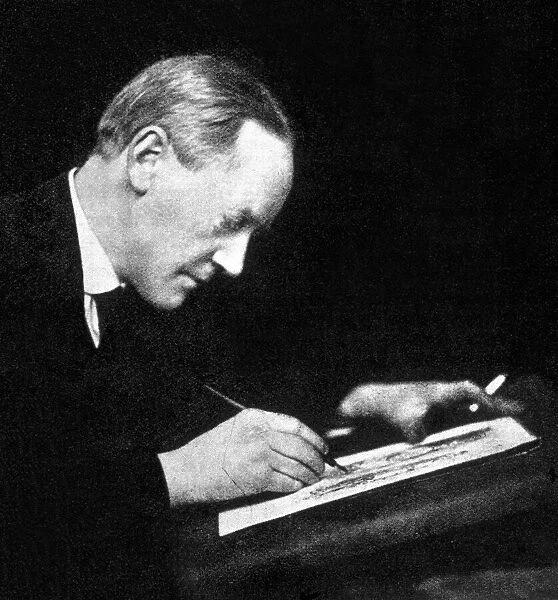
Arthur Moreland at work

Arthur Moreland (12 October 1867–4 August 1951) was an English artist of the early 20th-century remembered today for his humorous depictions of early British life.

Moreland was born in Ardwick, a village in Lancashire in 1867, the eldest of six children born to Elizabeth and Edward Moreland, an Agent for Black Lead Makers. Initially, he was employed as a commercial traveller before moving to London where, in about 1892, he commenced work for the London evening newspaper The Star in its advertising department. Entirely self-taught as an artist, his striking caricature of the newspaper's executive Ernest Parke was seen by Parke who, instead of sacking Moreland, transferred him to the art department. Later, for the Morning Leader Moreland was given the position of political cartoonist. His artwork for that newspaper was republished as Humors of History (1898) and More Humours of History (1925). More of his humorous "historical" artwork was published as The History of the Hun (1917). Some of his drawings from the illustrated weekly periodical All Sports were reprinted as The Comic History of Sport (1924). Moreland's drawings were "noted for their pungent wit" and they are credited with having influenced the 1906 United Kingdom general election, contributing to a landslide for the Liberal Party and the party's subsequent revival. He exhibited his artwork at the Coronation Exhibition in 1911.

During World War I Moreland ceased drawing political cartoons and became a freelance artist for various newspapers and illustrated books for other authors. These included The Gentle Golfer by Dr. T. P. MacNamara (1905), The Difficulties of Dr. Deguerre by Walter Hadwen (1926), and Lays from Lancashire by Nelson Jackson (1930).

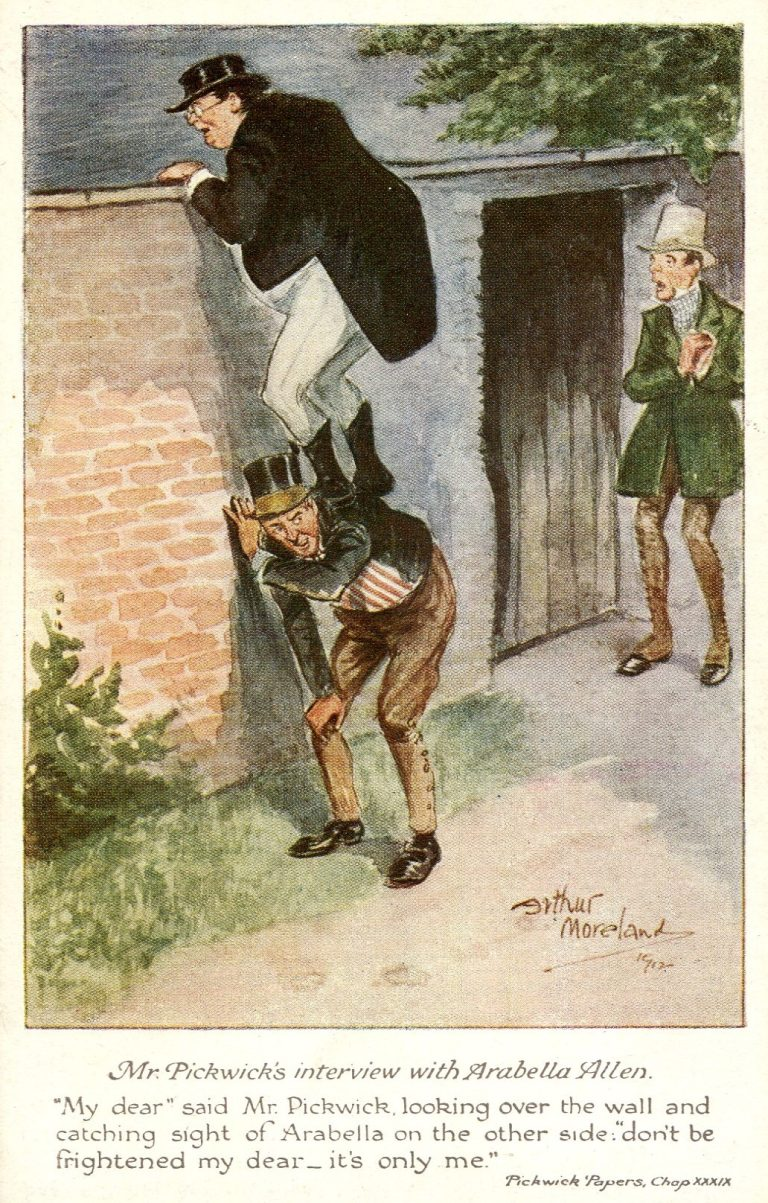
Postcard design by Moreland from The Pickwick Papers (1912)

Moreland wrote and illustrated two books on Charles Dickens: Dickens in London (1928) and Dickens Landmarks in London (1931). In about 1930 a set of six postcards depicting his artwork of Dickens' characters was published by Samuels Limited.

A Freemason, Moreland was initiated into Gallery Lodge No 1928 in 1908. He was the Honorable Secretary of the London Press Club for over 20 years, was chairman for four years, and on his retirement was made an honorary life member. He was a member of the Savage Club and a life member of the Newspaper Press Fund.

Moreland married Blanche Ada Rayson (1867-1958) in 1896. They had three children: Mary Hermione Moreland (1897-1989), Edward Rayson Moreland (1902-1958), and John Moreland (1908-1976). In 1911 the family were living in Denmark Hill in London. Moreland's occupation at that time was listed as 'Political Cartoonist'. In 1939 he and his wife were living with his sisters Beatrice and Mary Elizabeth Moreland in Ulverston in Lancashire; at that time his occupation was listed as 'Artist (Retired)'. His brother Edgar and his wife lived next door.

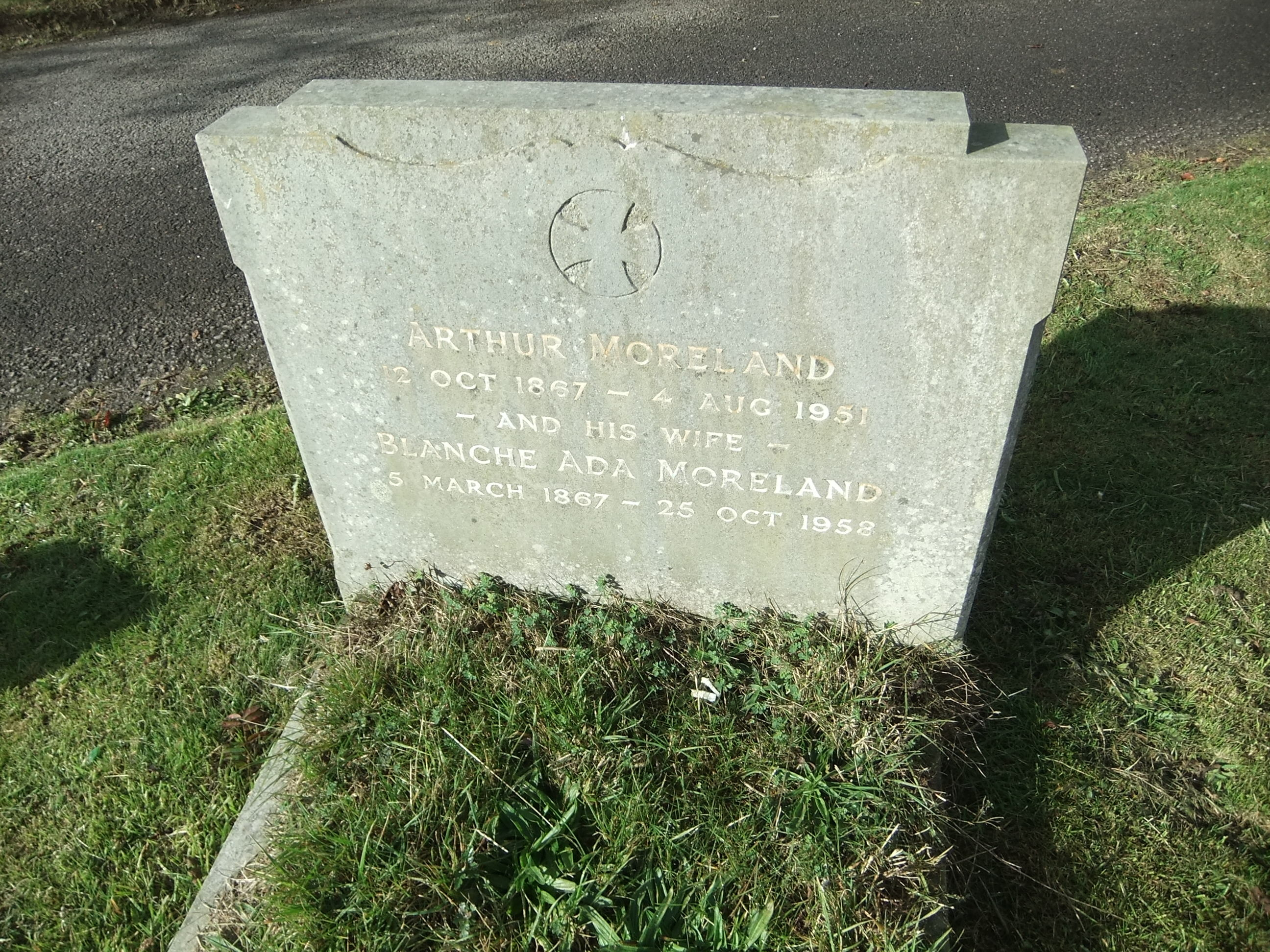
The grave of Arthur Moreland in Pembury in Kent

In his later years Moreland lived at Groombridge in Sussex. On his death in 1951 aged 83 he left an estate valued at £200 4s 6d. He and his wife are buried in the Pembury Burial Ground at Pembury in Kent.
