= University of Applied Sciences Landshut =

- Hochschule für angewandte Wissenschaften Landshut
- Former name: Fachhochschule Landshut
- Type: Public
- Established: 1978
- Chancellor: Johann Rist
- President: Michaela Wirtz
- Academic staff: 144
- Total staff: 406
- Students: 5080
- Location: Landshut, Bavaria, Germany; 48°33′22″N 12°11′51″E
- Campus: Urban
- Language: German
- Colours: Red
- Website: www.haw-landshut.de

The University of Applied Sciences Landshut (Hochschule für angewandte Wissenschaften Landshut) is a Fachhochschule in Landshut, between Munich and Regensburg, with 5.080 students and 144 professors. Its main focus areas include engineering, technology, social work, business, and a growing range of interdisciplinary fields. It was founded in 1978 under the name Fachhochschule Landshut, and renamed in 2008.

== General information ==
The University of Applied Sciences Landshut has six faculties:

- Business School
- Social Work
- Electrical and Industrial Engineering
- Computer Science
- Mechanical and Civil Engineering
- Health | Communication | Human-Technology Interaction
