= London Association for the Prevention of Premature Burial =

Organization founded in the 19th century

The London Association for the Prevention of Premature Burial was an association that was co-founded in 1896 by William Tebb and Walter Hadwen. In the 1800s, it was not common nor mandatory for a physician to examine a body after death and declare the person deceased. The absence of a final check by a competent person for signs of life led to fears of premature burial. The London Association for the Prevention of Premature Burial was created to bring attention to the perceived problem of this state of affairs. The association campaigned for improvements in death certification and for the building of "safety coffins" with warning devices that could be activated by a person mistakenly declared dead and buried.
