= Walter Hadwen =

English doctor (1854–1932)

Walter Hadwen MRCS MRCP
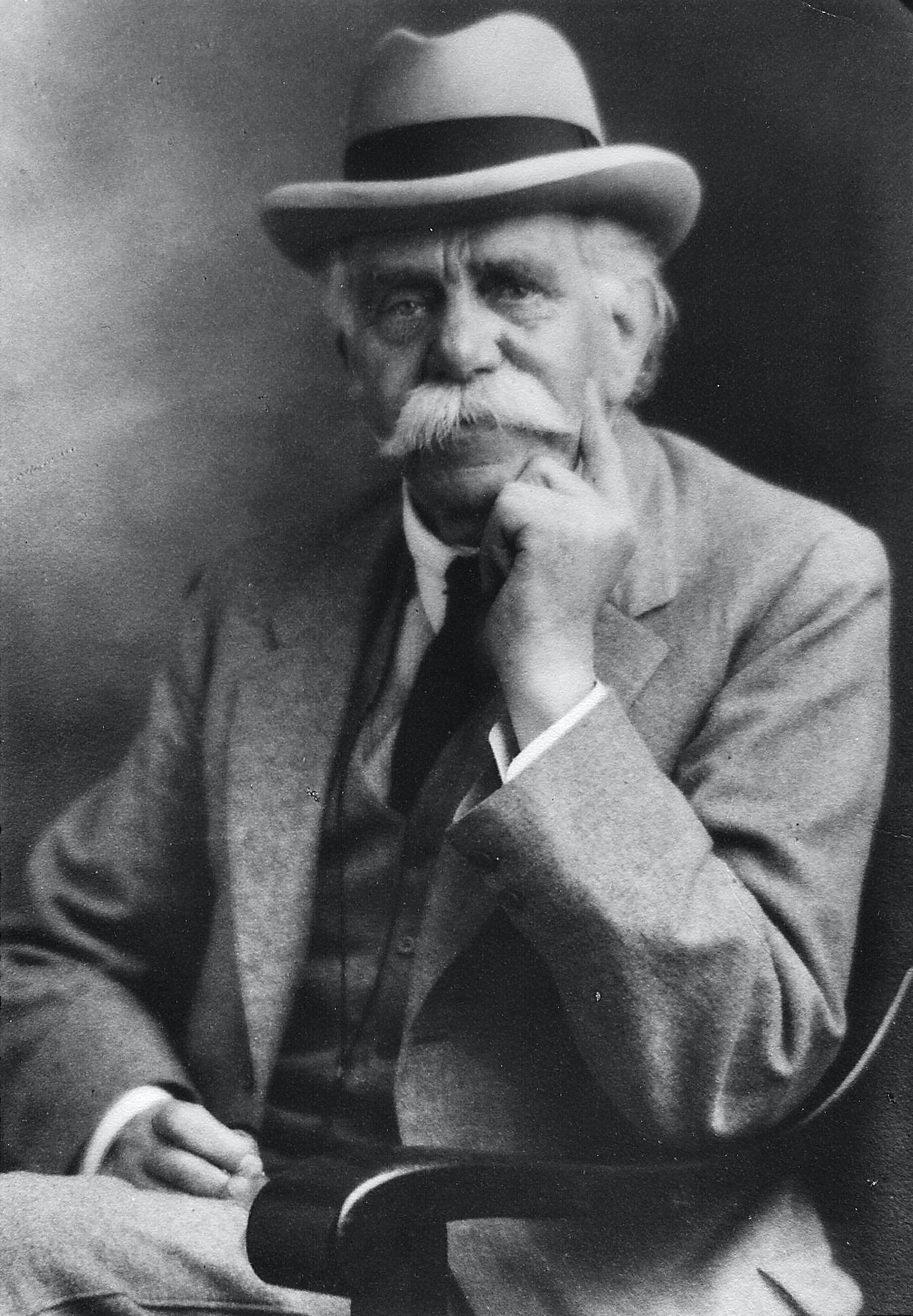
- Born: Walter Robert Hadwen; 3 August 1854; Woolwich, England
- Died: 27 December 1932 (aged 78); Gloucester, England
- Education: Bristol University
- Occupations: General practitioner; pharmaceutical chemist; writer; anti-vivisection and anti-vaccination activist
- Spouse: Alice Harral (m. 1878)
- Children: 3

Walter Robert Hadwen MRCS MRCP (3 August 1854 – 27 December 1932) was an English general practitioner, pharmaceutical chemist and writer. He was president of the British Union for the Abolition of Vivisection (BUAV) and an anti-vaccination campaigner, known for his denial of the germ theory of disease.

== Biography ==
Walter Robert Hadwen was born in Woolwich on 3 August 1854. He began his career as a pharmacist in Highbridge, Somerset, then subsequently trained as a doctor at Bristol University. After qualifying, he moved to Gloucester in 1896. Hadwen was recruited as a member of the British Union for the Abolition of Vivisection by its founder and then president Frances Power Cobbe who hired a private investigator to assess his credentials (he was a vegetarian and total abstainer, had a reputation as a "firebrand" orator and was held in "high local esteem"). She subsequently selected him as her successor.

He later became a member of the Plymouth Brethren and married Alice Harral in 1878; they had three children. Hadwen was a frequent speaker for the National Anti-Vaccination League. In 1896, he co-founded the London Association for the Prevention of Premature Burial alongside William Tebb. Hadwen stated that the "modern germ theory is all bosh". In 1906 a presentation was given in honour of Hadwen at Charing Cross, the headquarters of the British Union for the Abolition of Vivisection. Hadwen was presented with a silver rose-bowl with the inscription "Presented to Walter R. Hadwen, Esq., M.D. by anti-vivisectionist friends as a token of their esteem and gratitude for his valuable services as a leader of the movement to abolish vivisection, August 16th, 1906". He was a speaker at the Fourth Triennial International Congress of the World League Against Vivisection held at Caxton Hall in 1909.

Hadwen was active in general practice until he died from a severe heart attack in 1932, age 78. In his honour the Dr Hadwen Trust was founded in 1970 to fund exclusive non-animal techniques to replace animal experiments.

Hadwen's pamphlets on anti-vivisection are archived at the Special Collections Research Center in NC State University Libraries.

== Vegetarianism ==
Hadwen became a vegetarian in his early twenties when taking a bet from a fellow student that he could live six months without eating meat. His bet was successful and he stated that "For my part I am quite satisfied with my trial of vegetarianism, and it would take more than mortal power to persuade me once again to make my stomach a graveyard for the purpose of burying dead bodies in."

== Manslaughter trial ==
In 1924, having applied his rejection of the germ theory of disease, and his refusal to use diphtheria anti-serum produced by inoculation of animals to the treatment of Nellie Burnham, a young girl, she died and he was tried for manslaughter by criminal medical negligence. He was acquitted of all charges.

== Selected publications ==
- Is Flesh-Eating Harmful?, 1895
- The Case Against Vaccination, 1896
- Smallpox at Gloucester: A Reply to Dr. Coupland’s Report, 1902. Reprinted from "The Reformer," National Anti-Vaccination League: Gloucester.
- Vivisection: Its Follies and Cruelties, 1905
- A Debate on Should Vivisection be Abolished?, 1907
- A Correspondence in "The Daily Mail" Between Sir Victor Horsley and Walter R. Hadwen, on Vivisection (1908)
- A Debate on Is Vivisection Immoral, Cruel, Useless and Unscientific? (1908)
- Dr. Walter Robert Hadwen's Works, 1908
- A Vivisection Controversy, 1911
- Jennerism and Pasteurism, 1914
- Experiments on Living Animals, Useless and Cruel, 1914
- The Difficulties of Dr. Deguerre, 1926 (illustrated by Arthur Moreland)

== See also ==
- Vaccine hesitancy
