= Wildwood Cemetery (Pennsylvania) =

Cemetery in Loyalsock, Pennsylvania

Coordinates: 41.251°N 77.035°W

- Interactive map of Wildwood Cemetery

Details
- Established: 1863
- Location: Loyalsock Township, Pennsylvania
- Size: 340 acres
- No. of graves: Over 72,000

Wildwood Cemetery is a cemetery located in Loyalsock Township, Pennsylvania just north of the city of Williamsport. Wildwood was established in 1863 as the main cemetery for Williamsport and its surrounding communities. With a size of 340 acres it is the largest cemetery by size and grave count in Lycoming County, Pennsylvania.

The cemetery is split in two by Wildwood Boulevard/Cemetery Road. East Wildwood contains the cemeteries, crematorium, offices, and all of the larger public mausoleum. West Wildwood is where the military memorial and monument are located, as well as the Praying Hands mausoleum.

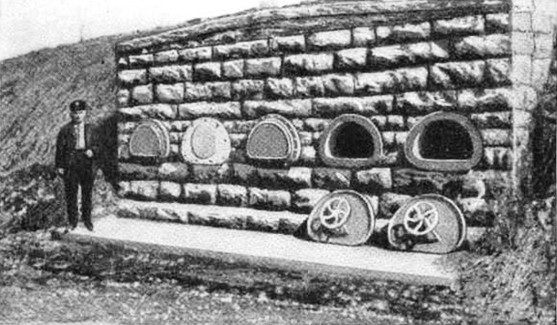
The escape hatches

The cemetery has an "escape burial hatch". Thomas Pursell, a local firefighter, wanted a burial arrangement for which he or his family could escape in case they were prematurely buried. The resulting design was heavily documented by media in Williamsport and the surrounding areas. There have been six other such hatched built in surrounding cemeteries based on Pursell's original.

== Notable people buried at Wildwood ==
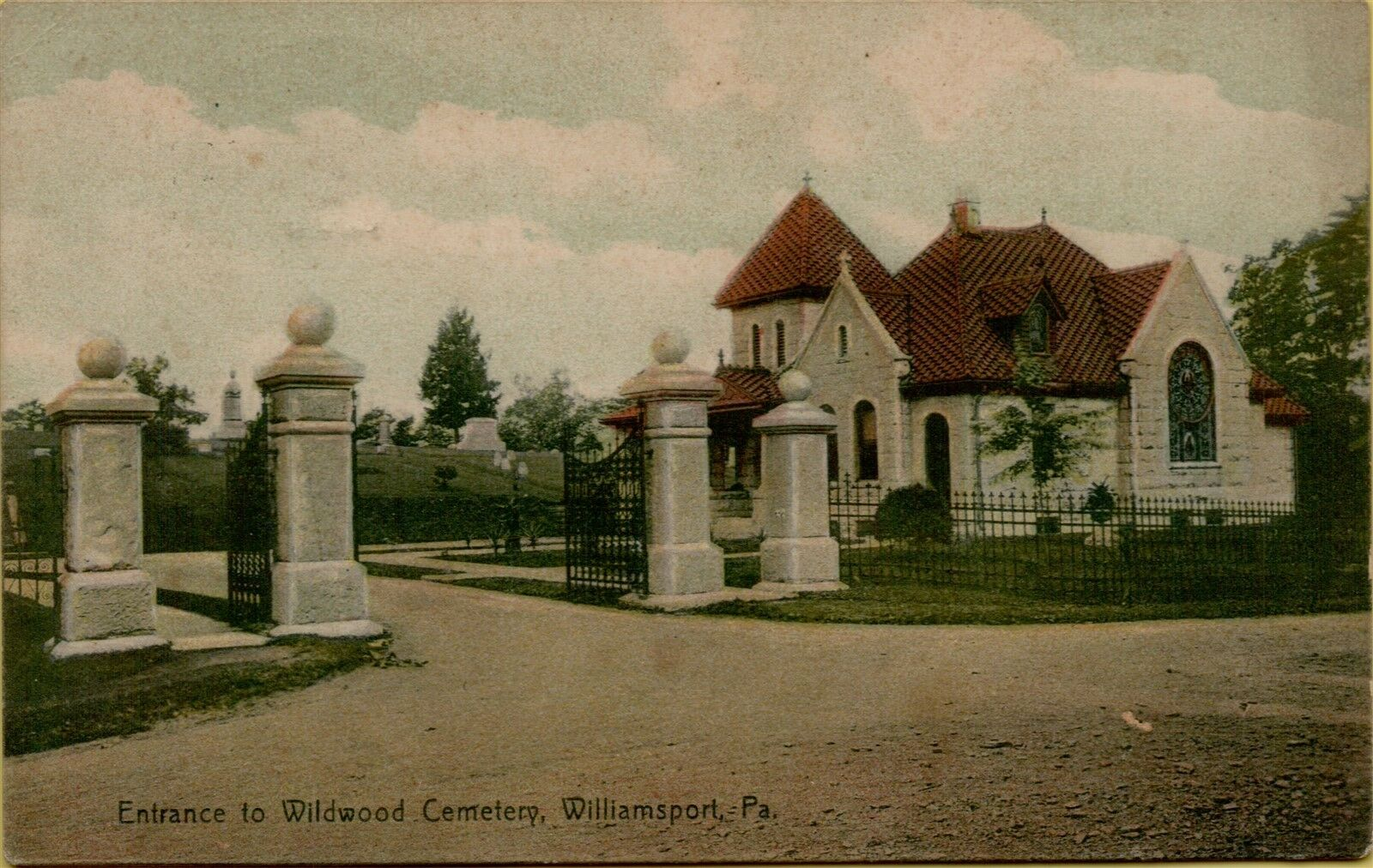
Wildwood Cemetery, c. 1909

- James Gamble (died 1883)
- Peter Herdic (died 1888)
- Robert Porter Allen (died 1890)
- Henry Clay McCormick (died 1902)
- Elias Deemer (died 1918)
- Edgar Raymond Kiess (died 1930)
- Bucky Veil (died 1931)
- Herman T. Schneebeli (died 1982)
- Bob Pellegrini (died 2008)

== See also ==
- List of cemeteries in Pennsylvania
- List of cemeteries in the United States

Nearby cemeteries

- Highland Cemetery, Lock Haven, Pennsylvania
