= William Tebb =

English businessman and social reformer

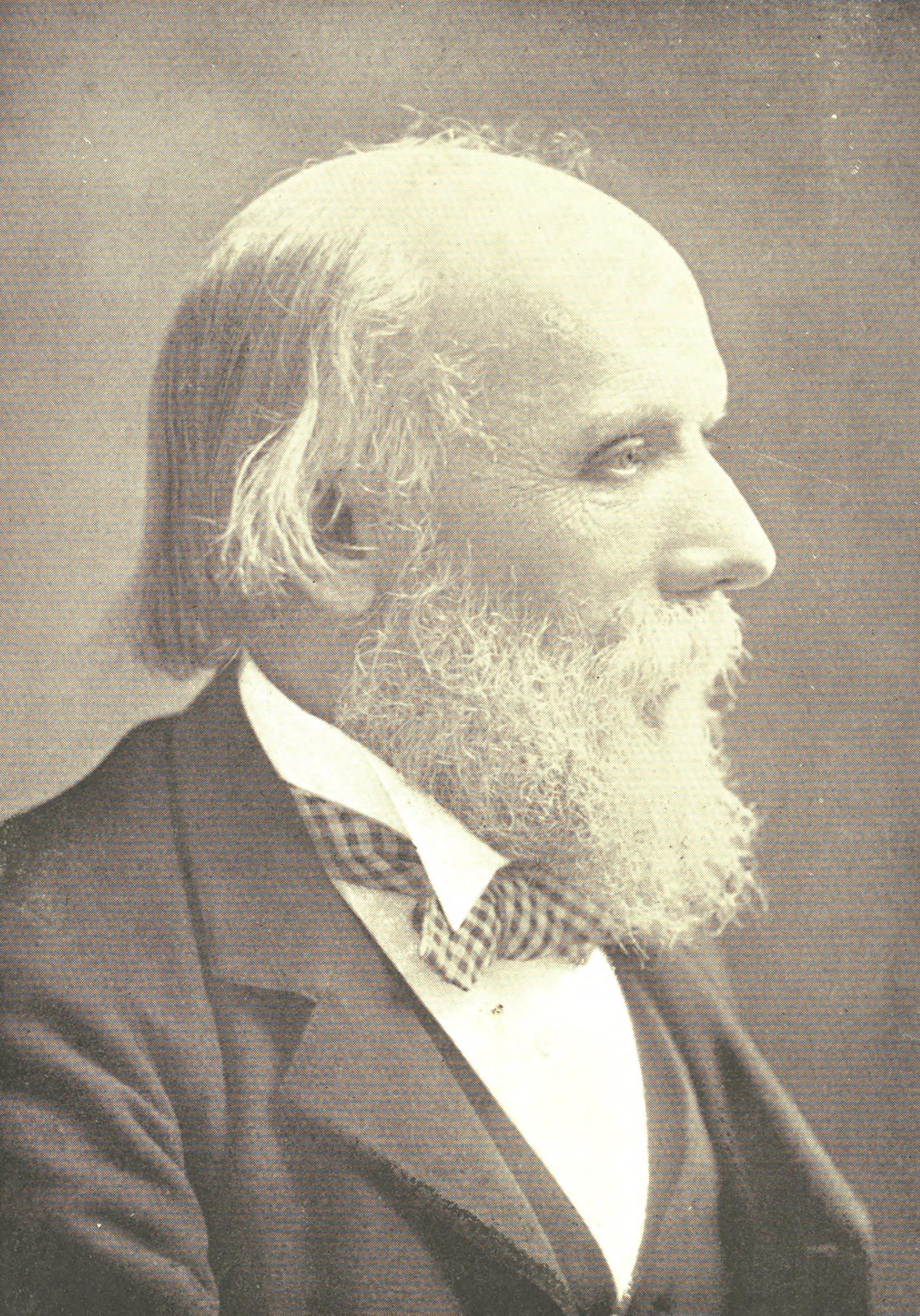
- Born: 22 October 1830; Manchester, England
- Died: 23 January 1917 (aged 86); Burstow, England
- Spouse: Mary Elizabeth Scott (m. 1856)
- Children: 4

William Tebb (22 October 1830 – 23 January 1917) was an English businessman and wide-ranging social reformer. He was an anti-vaccinationist and author of anti-vaccination books. He was also concerned about premature burial, and co-founded the London Association for the Prevention of Premature Burial.

== Early life ==
William Tebb was born in Manchester on 22 October 1830, the son of Eleanor (née Hewetson) and William Tebb. Privately educated, Tebb started work at fifteen for a Manchester business, attending evening classes where he encountered the ideas of the British radicals John Bright, Richard Cobden and Robert Owen, and the American Christian social reformer Adin Ballou. His ideas were also influenced by a Salford Swedenborgian sect promoting physical purity, food reform, and teetotalism.

In 1852, Tebb went to the United States as a representative of the Vegetarian Society. He was introduced to Ballou and made frequent visits to the latter's experimental Hopedale Community, where he met and married Mary Elizabeth Scott on 4 December 1856.

In the 1850s he became active in the American abolitionist movement, but he and his family returned to England in the 1860s to escape a malaria outbreak, settling in London. Tebb became a director of a company making bleaching chemicals for paper, earning a large fortune that he used to fund a variety of social causes.

He co-founded the Royal Normal College for the Blind, was active in the anti-vivisection movement, contributed to the Royal Society for the Prevention of Cruelty to Animals (becoming a vice-president of the National Canine Defence League), as well as joining the Society for the Prevention of Cruelty to Children and the Humanitarian League. Politically a radical liberal, he was a member of the Devonshire Club, National Liberal Club, New Reform Club, and the Vigilance Association for the Defence of Personal Rights.

== Anti-vaccination activism ==
In 1869, Tebb became deeply committed to the anti-vaccination campaign whose aim was repeal of the Vaccination Acts that made smallpox vaccination compulsory for children. He himself was prosecuted and fined thirteen times for refusal to vaccinate his third daughter. In 1880, he co-founded the London Society for the Abolition of Compulsory Vaccination (LSACV) and established its official publication, the Vaccination Inquirer. He served as its chairman until 1896, when it was dissolved to form the National Anti-Vaccination League (NAVL), of which he was president.

He became a highly publicised activist against compulsory smallpox vaccination, and then one of the most prolific writers and activists against vaccination itself. Although interested in spiritualism and theosophy, he campaigned not on religious grounds but on general appeal to values of social liberty.

He visited the United States in 1879, and campaigned against smallpox vaccinations. Smallpox had recently become epidemic again, after a decline in vaccination, following a decline in cases of smallpox earlier in the century. Several American anti-vaccination organisations arose around the time of his visit.

The NAVL succeeded in its lobbying for a government enquiry (a royal commission in 1886), and the Vaccination Act 1907 that introduced exemption from vaccination on grounds of conscientious objection. Although he continued to campaign against vaccination, in later life Tebb took on further causes.

== Later life ==
In 1895, he moved to Rede Hall, Burstow, Surrey, where he occupied major posts in the parish council, local horticultural society and cricket club. He paid for a monument to Adin Ballou at Hopedale, and a drinking fountain in Burstow in memory of the 400,000 horses killed and wounded during the Boer War, to which he was strongly opposed as a pacifist and anti-imperialist.

Along with Walter Hadwen, in 1896 he had co-founded the London Association for the Prevention of Premature Burial, that campaigned for burial reforms to ensure that those buried were certainly dead. He died at his home, on 23 January 1917, from natural causes. His will specified that "unmistakable evidence of decomposition" should be visible, so he was cremated a week after his death.

== Personal life ==
William Tebb had a son and three daughters. His son was a doctor, Dr. William Scott Tebb who wrote "A Century of Vaccination and what it teaches us". His daughter, Florence Joy Tebb (1858–1936), studied mathematics at Girton College, Cambridge and worked closely with her husband the biologist Raphael Weldon. His other daughter, Mary Christine Tebb, was a biochemist and married the biochemist Otto Rosenheim [].

== Publications ==
- Sanitation, not Vaccination the True Protection against Small-Pox, 1881 paper, Second International Congress of Anti-Vaccinators
- Testimonies of Medical Authorities on Vaccination, Preface, 1882, London Society for the Abolition of Compulsory Vaccination
- Compulsory Vaccination in England: with incidental references to foreign states, 1884, E.W. Allen, London
- The Increase of Cancer, 1892, The Tocsin. Booklet reprint 1892, Wertheimer, Lea & Co., London
- Leprosy and Vaccination, 1893, Swan Sonnenschein & Co., London
- Premature burial, and how it may be prevented, with special reference to trance catalepsy, and other forms of suspended animation, ed. Walter Hadwen, Swan, London, 1905
