= German government response to the COVID-19 pandemic =

The government of Germany initially responded to the COVID-19 pandemic in the country with preventive measures to curb the spread of the coronavirus disease 2019 in the country. With the nationwide spread of the disease from March 2020, preventive measures were replaced by containment measures, including a lockdown from March. On 25 March, the Bundestag made the determination of an epidemic situation of national significance (de:Epidemische Lage von nationaler Tragweite). This created a legal framework for the government of chancellor Angela Merkel and the heads of the 16 German states to agree on nationwide pandemic restrictions. Implementation of decisions by that panel remained a matter of individual states, however, leading to differences in anti-pandemic rules and regulations across states. The Bundesnotbremse (federal emergency brake) in force from April to June 2021 sought to establish uniformity.

The first months of fighting the pandemic were widely considered a success. This was seen by observers to have been due to a wide acceptance of the cautious course of Merkel, whose televised speech on 18 March was considered highly effective. Case numbers were decreasing to a degree that much of public life had returned to normal by late summer. This success was not repeated with the second wave of the pandemic, which saw daily new cases rise seven-fold over the course of October 2020 and resulted in a second lockdown from December 2020, and the third wave in the first months of 2021. Besides lockdown fatigue gaining ground, another reason was the approaching 2021 German federal election, in which CDU/CSU contenders for the succession of Merkel tried to draw contrasts, often with a less cautious approach to the pandemic than hers. The accelerating vaccination campaign was credited with overcoming the third wave.

The fourth wave of the pandemic from August 2021 led to record case numbers by November, while the severe cases and deaths among adults were far lower than in the previous waves due to the vaccinations. Before the formation of the Scholz cabinet in early December, observers saw anti-pandemic decision making as being hampered by the nature of the caretaker government of Merkel, while also saying that the government had since much earlier been overly hesitant to impose tough, unpopular decisions. With expiry of the epidemic situation of national significance in November 2021 a catalogue of measures was rolled out, including restrictions tied to the hospitalization rate. Booster shots were a central part of the government strategy against the Omicron variant. A partial vaccine mandate for health workers took effect in mid-March 2022, but a proposal for a vaccine mandate for all aged 60 and over was rejected in the Bundestag on 7 April, in what was seen by observers as a major setback for the government.

Many coronavirus measures faced legal challenges from individuals. In November 2021, the Federal Constitutional Court rejected a challenge against the Bundesnotbremse in which several members of the FDP (Free Democrats) party had participated. The far-right populist AfD party also challenged several measures.

== Advisory bodies ==
During the pandemic, the German government received advice from several scientific bodies. They also collaborated on occasion: following a request by health minister Jens Spahn, the Standing Committee on Vaccination (STIKO) at the Robert Koch Institute, the German National Academy of Sciences Leopoldina, and the German Ethics Council produced recommendations on 9 November 2020 with criteria for how to prioritize the distribution of COVID-19 vaccines.

Other organizations and bodies besides the ones listed below also provided pandemic advisories for the government. The Helmholtz Association issued a statement on the pandemic in April 2020.

=== Robert Koch Institute ===
On 27 February 2020, Lothar Wieler, President of the Robert Koch Institute (RKI), announced that there would be daily press briefings on the development of the spread of COVID-19 in the country. Wieler considered the situation still under control, although he considered it possible that this may change with a future outbreak. The RKI issued daily situation reports on the pandemic, including the number of newly reported cases and overall assessments. It also regularly published risk assessments, which were based on infectiousness; severity of the disease and incidence of long-term issues; and the burden on the health care systems. Information on all three criteria was sourced from Germany as well as abroad.

As part of the RKI, the vaccination commission STIKO issued recommendations on COVID-19 vaccines from late 2020, when vaccines first became available. In July 2021, as several politicians urged for a general vaccination recommendation for children and youths aged 12 to 17 years, STIKO chief Thomas Mertens called the pressure "counterproductive", and said that there were not yet enough data for an update of the recommendation.

On 15 January 2022, based on a revision of the Infection Protection Act that had been passed earlier that week, the RKI shortened the duration of validity of certificates of recovery from a coronavirus infection from six to three months. Health minister Lauterbach had not ordered the measure, nor been informed of it in advance, but supported it. Several politicians called for the shortening to be retracted in view of the confusion it would create, given that Germany had supported an EU-wide adherence to a six-month validity. Some also sharply criticized that the Bundestag parliament would continue to operate under the six-month rule. The revision of the Infection Protection Act was rescinded weeks after it came into effect.

The publication of internal RKI documents in March 2024, after a court ruling in favour of a smaller media organization which had sought to obtain them under freedom of information legislation, stoked renewed debate about the assessment of the government response to the pandemic.

=== German National Academy of Sciences ===
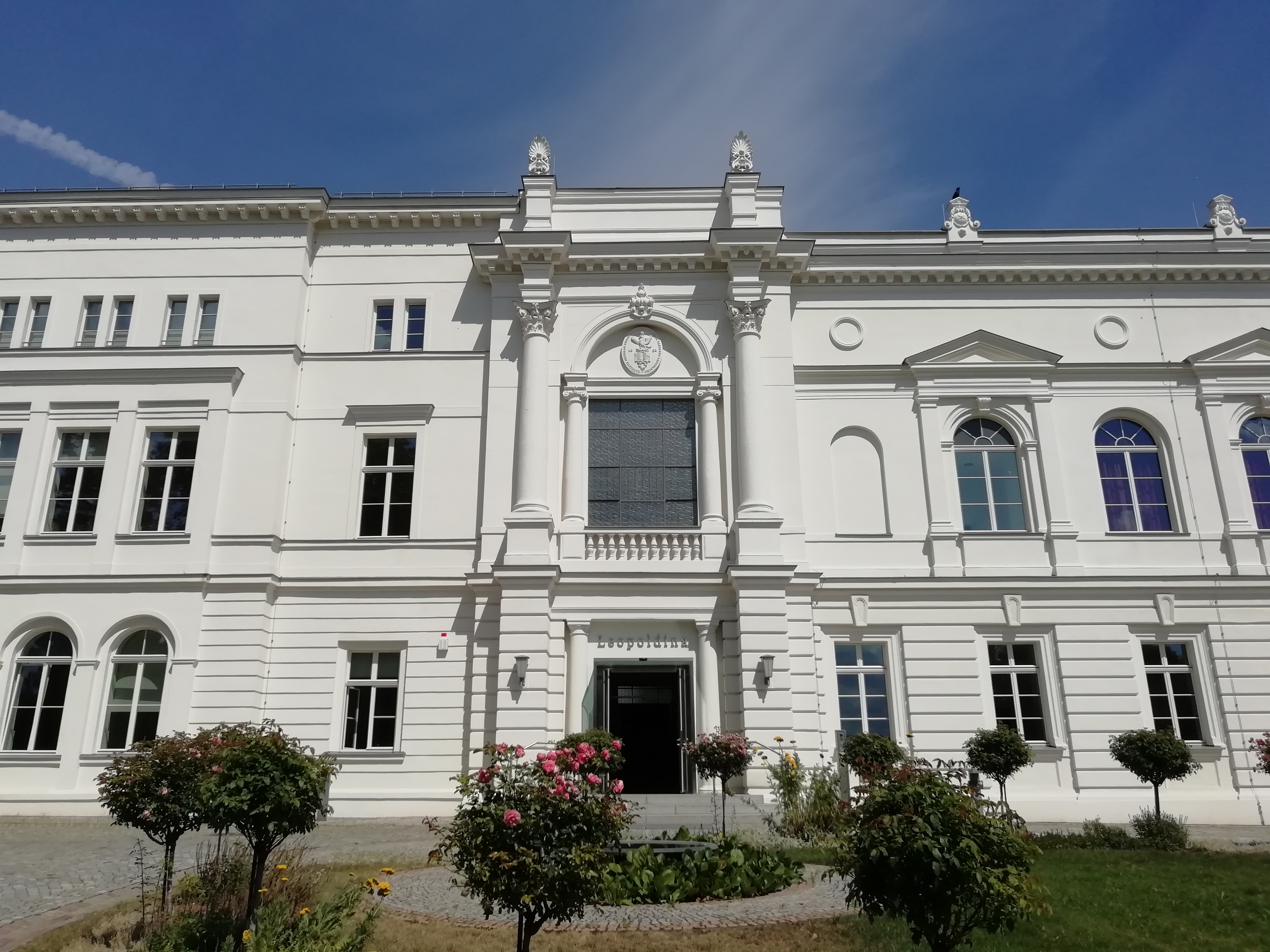
The statements by Leopoldina (main building in Halle pictured) had a substantial impact on anti-pandemic measures.

Between March 2020 and November 2021, the German National Academy of Sciences Leopoldina published ten ad hoc statements which addressed the impact of the pandemic from a multidisciplinary perspective. The statement published on 13 April 2020, which described steps for the reopening as the first wave of the pandemic began to ease, was described by Chancellor Angela Merkel before its release as "very important" for the further course to be taken by the government with regard to the pandemic.

=== German Ethics Council ===
Between March 2020 and November 2022, the German Ethics Council published six ad hoc recommendations on the pandemic. In the sixth one published on 22 December 2021, a narrow majority, 13 out of 24, of council members supported expanding the vaccine mandate to all adults in Germany aged 18 and over. Chancellor Olaf Scholz later dropped plans for a general vaccine mandate.

In the 160-page recommendation presented on 4 April 2022, the council admonished that in the preceding two years of the pandemic, vulnerable groups had not been sufficiently in the focus of government efforts, and that especially institutions such as local health departments, nursing homes, and schools had been insufficiently prepared for a pandemic.

=== Corona expert panel ===
Following an announcement by chancellor Scholz in late November 2021, just as his cabinet with a three-party traffic light coalition had been formed, the Corona-Expertenrat (corona expert panel) was established in December. Its task was to monitor the course of the pandemic and the danger coming from any virus variants. The panel, whose members were appointed by Scholz, included Christian Drosten, Hendrik Streeck, Thomas Mertens, Lothar Wieler, Melanie Brinkmann, Alena Buyx, and Viola Priesemann, of a total of 19 members. The panel had its first meeting on 14 December.

On 1 July 2022, the panel presented a report on the efficacy of government anti-pandemic measures. The report was also commissioned to shape the anti-pandemic measures which were expected to be necessary from autumn, when previous legislation would expire and coronavirus cases were expected to go up sharply. The report did not arrive at clear-cut recommendations, saying that lockdowns were effective in the early stage of the pandemic but had less effect later, and that face masks were effective but only so if properly fitted. The report also criticized the Robert Koch Institute for not having done enough to provide data for the study, and also pointed to time and staff limitations as reasons for the report not having been as comprehensive as would otherwise have been possible. In a 7 July Bundestag debate, health minister Lauterbach said: "It's sad that after two years we still do not get good daily data," and vowed to tackle that issue.

The panel met for the last time on 4 April 2023.

== Corona crisis team ==
On 28 February 2020, the German government announced the establishment of a new crisis team (Corona-Krisenstab) tasked with combating the spread of COVID-19, which was to meet twice a week. The crisis team met nearly 100 times until November 2021, when chancellor-in-waiting Olaf Scholz announced the creation of a successor body which would be larger, more influential, and advised by scientists. Outgoing chancellor Angela Merkel had already signaled her support for the new crisis team.

In line with these plans, a new Corona-Krisenstab was created on behest of the outgoing government of chancellor Merkel, and commenced its work in November 2021. Headed by Major General Carsten Breuer, the main tasks of the team were the coordination and cooperation in the steering of the vaccination campaign, and the delivery and distribution of vaccines. It had up to 30 members.

The crisis team was dissolved as per a government announcement on 11 May 2022. A government spokesperson explained this by what she called a "completely different situation" regarding infections and vaccinations. At the same time, she cautioned that the measure was by no means to be understood as signaling an end of the pandemic, as it would be "fully clear" that it was continuing.

== Criteria for the adjustment of restrictions ==
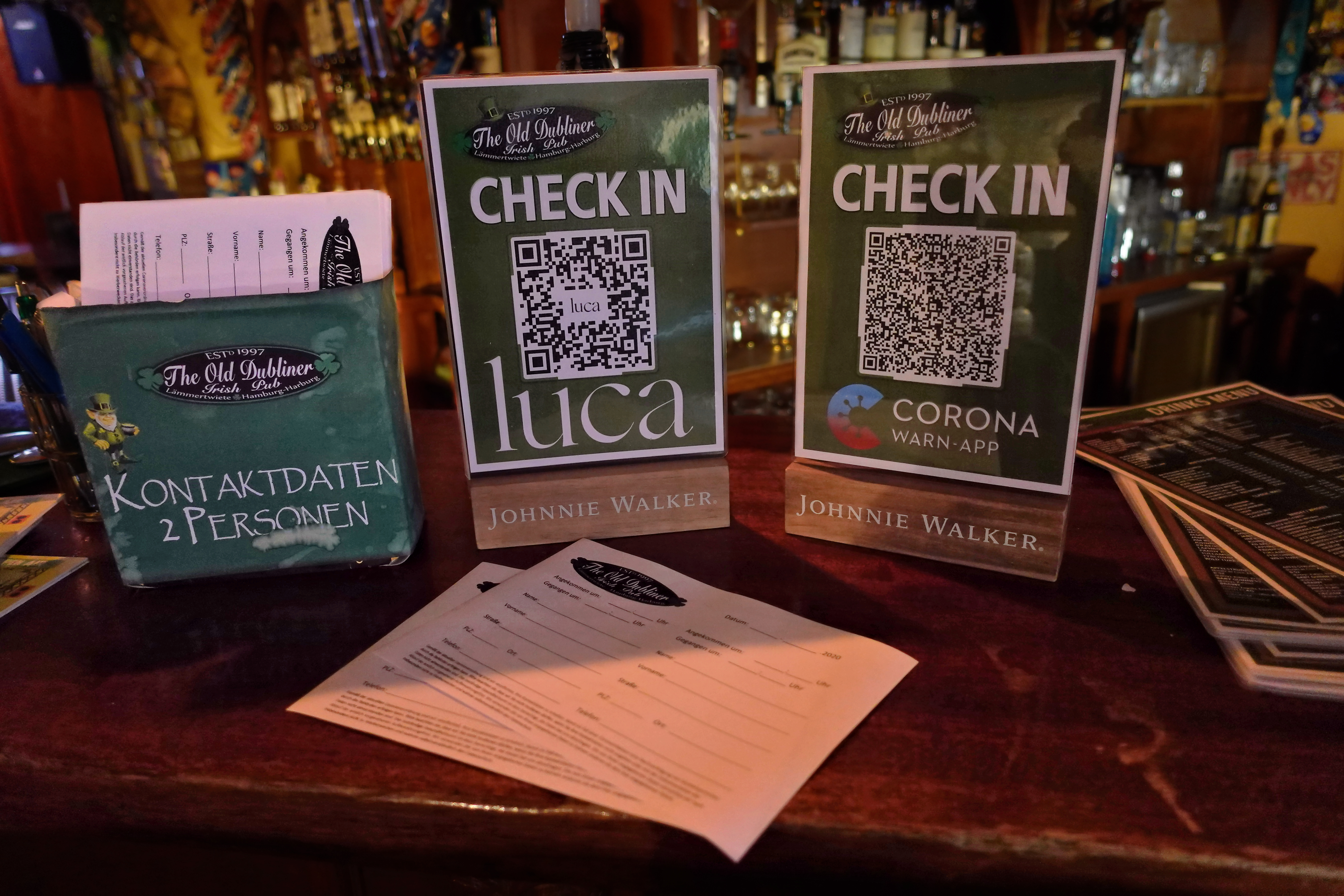
Three ways to sign in for contact tracing during the COVID-19 pandemic in Germany

From May 2020 until late 2021, the so-called "seven-day incidence" was the main criterion for determining restrictions to fight the pandemic. The seven-day incidence was measured at a locality (district, state or federal level) as the average number of new cases per 100,000 residents in the preceding seven days. At a videoconference of chancellor Angela Merkel and the 16 state governors on 6 May 2020, state governments were authorised to reimpose restrictions immediately in case of the seven-day incidence surpassing the threshold of 50. This measure, billed as "emergency brake", was intended to allow quick action against local outbreaks before the entire country would be affected. Starting from 14 September 2020, the RKI reported on the front page of its daily updates the countrywide seven-day incidence, as well as the number of districts with a seven-day incidence above 50; from 2 October 2020, the incidence was shown separately for those aged 60 and over, and from 28 December, also separately for those aged 80 and over. When imposing the new lockdown in early November 2020, the government stated that its goal was to reduce the seven-day incidence to about 50, as this would enable contact tracing. Additionally, in the January 2021 extension and toughening of the measures, a seven-day incidence of 200 or above triggered a travel ban for the affected district. Before the seven-day incidence was established as a key indicator, the effective reproduction number R played a major role in the public debate.

At a meeting of chancellor Merkel, chancellor-in-waiting Olaf Scholz and the 16 state premiers on 18 November 2021, it was agreed that the so-called hospitalization incidence would be the new benchmark for introducing tougher anti-pandemic measures. By that time, the seven-day incidence had been subject to long-standing criticism for its shortcomings by several experts, including epidemiologist Gérard Krause of the Helmholtz Centre for Infection Research (HZI). A September 2021 amendment of the Infection Protection Act had already included the number of hospitalizations as a principal factor, besides the occupancy of intensive care units and the vaccination rate. Under the new rules from November 2021, if the number of hospitalized in the preceding seven days exceeded the number of three per 100,000 residents, all public leisure facilities were to operate under the "2G" rule. If it exceeded the number of six, they were to operate under the "2G+" rule (see section 3G, 2G, and 2G+ rules below for the definition of these notions). If it exceeded the number of nine, further measures such as contact restrictions were to be implemented. The absence of any such threshold to date had been criticized by Merkel a day earlier, with her saying that the hospitalization rate as an index without such a threshold would be "a toothless tiger".

In September 2021, critics had said that the method for computing the hospitalization rate tended to considerably underestimate it. A main reason cited for this was that hospitalizations would usually occur several days after a positive coronavirus test and consequently, due to the computation method adopted by the Robert Koch Institute, contribute to past hospitalization rates, rather than the present one.

== 3G, 2G, and 2G+ rules ==
From August until November 2021, most of Germany was operating under the "3G" rule, which limited access to hospitals and nursing homes, as well as restaurants, bars and cinemas to those who were fully vaccinated, the recovered, and those who had recently tested negative for the coronavirus. The "3G" rule was seen by observers as increasing pressure on the population to get vaccinated. As the fourth wave of the pandemic gained momentum towards the end of 2021, particularly in view of the growing pressure on intensive care units, there were increased calls to adopt the "2G" rule, under which access to the aforementioned venues was limited to the vaccinated and the recovered. The "2G" rule was incorporated in the anti-pandemic measures passed by the Bundestag on 18 November 2021, as well as the "2G plus" (2G+) rule, which added the requirement of an up-to-date negative coronavirus test to the "2G" requirements. In November 2021, Bavarian premier Markus Söder announced the implementation of a statewide "2G" rule, which he described as a "de facto lockdown" for unvaccinated people. Besides not being allowed access to facilities such as hairdressers, as well as universities and adult education centers, they would be also subject to contact restrictions.

At a meeting of Lauterbach with the state health ministers on 14 December 2021, it was agreed that the testing requirement of the "2G+" rule would be dropped for those having received a vaccine booster shot at least 15 days earlier, except for nursing homes and hospitals. Several German states had already adopted this measure.

== Discussion of vaccine mandate ==
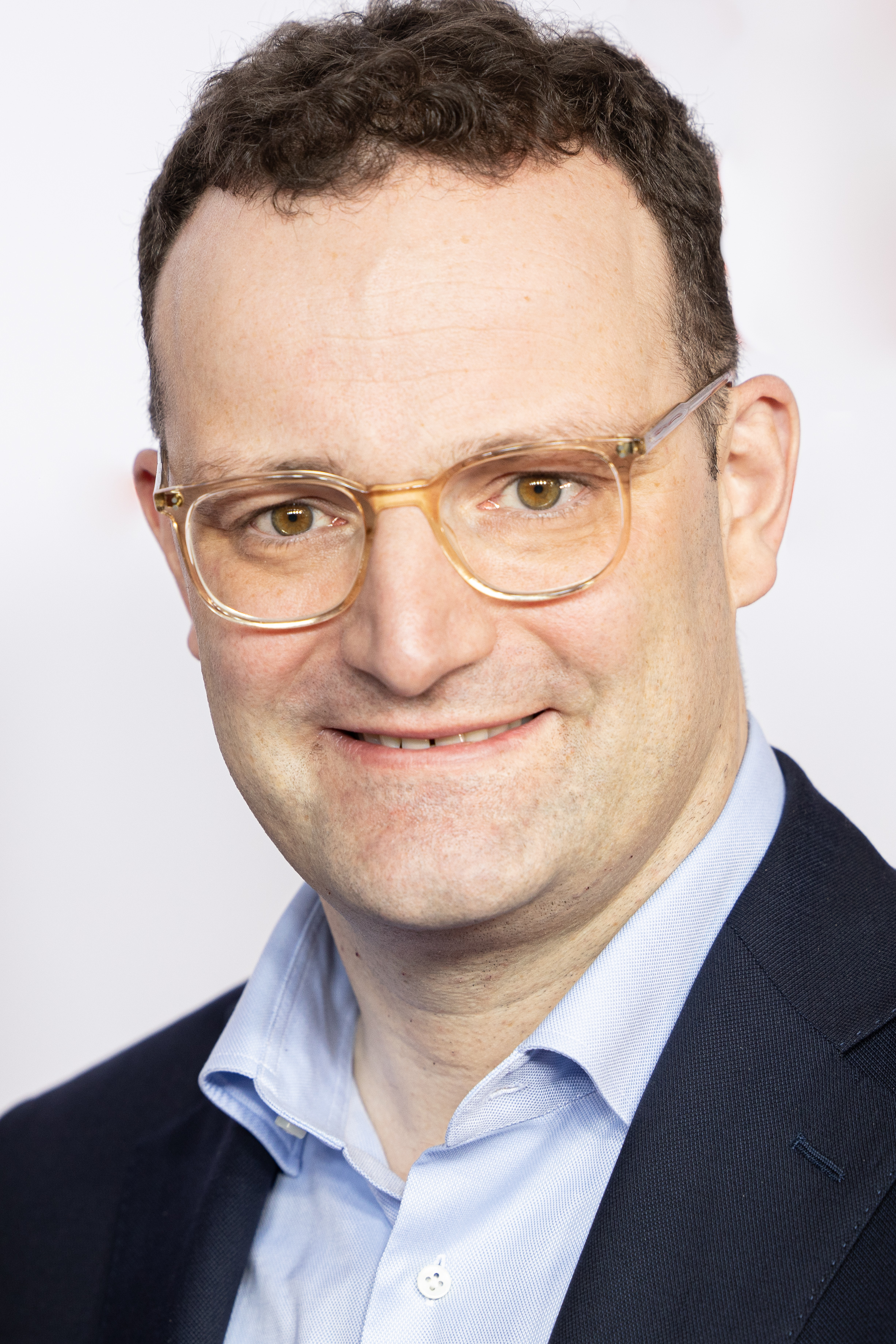
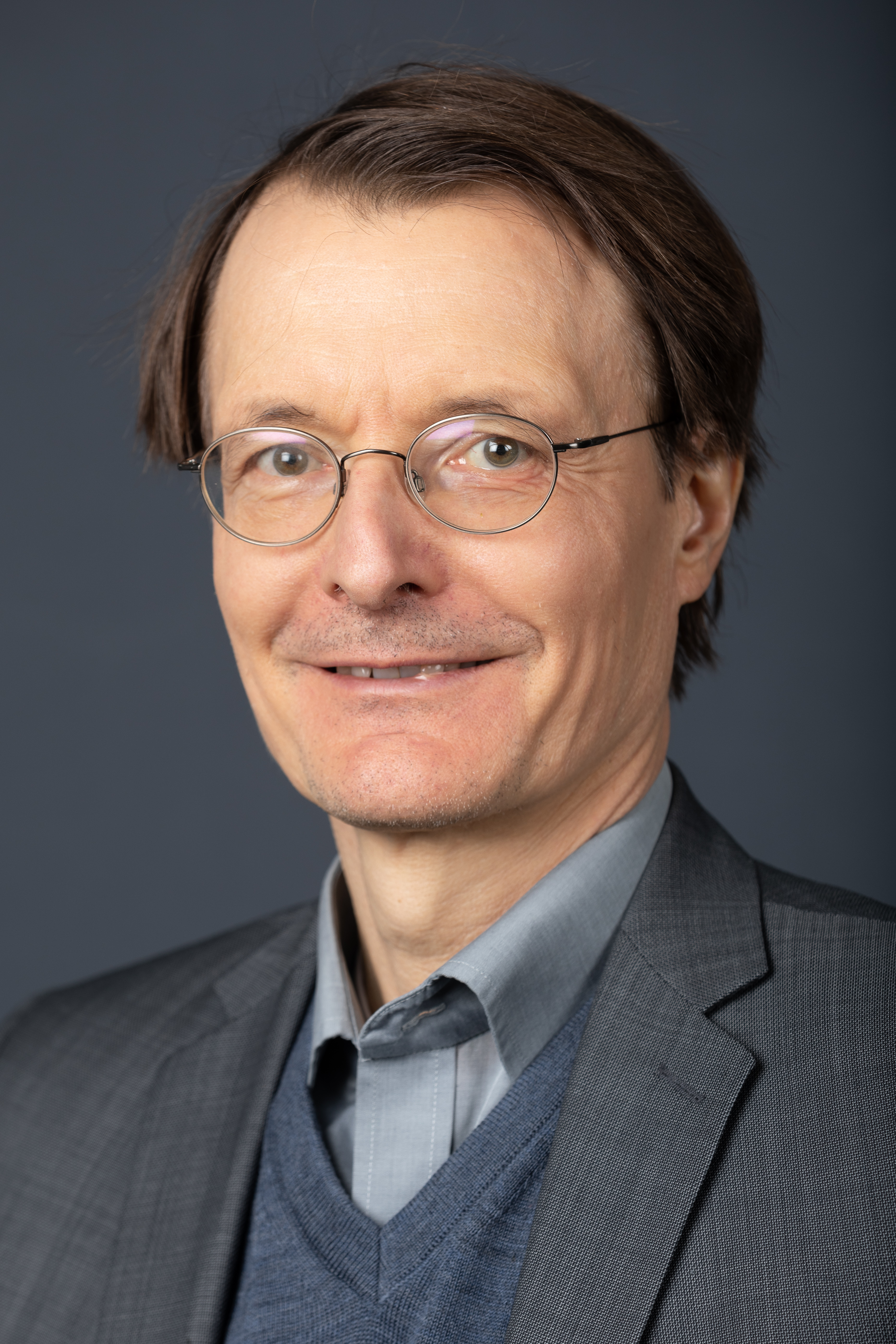
Federal Ministers of Health during the pandemic: until 8 December 2021 Jens Spahn (left) and from 8 December 2021 Karl Lauterbach (right).

Until mid-2021, a general COVID-19 vaccine mandate was considered by observers to be highly unlikely, with politicians from several parties, including health minister Spahn in February 2021, ruling out such a mandate. In July 2021, however, flagging vaccine uptake and a looming fourth wave of the pandemic contributed to an emerging debate on the matter. Observers considered that some of the anti-pandemic measures had in practice come close to being a mandate, such as access to bars and restaurants without a negative coronavirus test (as per the "3G" rule). Chancellor Merkel urged the public to get vaccinated but said that there would be no obligation to do so, as this could endanger public trust. Constitutional lawyers stressed the need for objective reasons for distinguishing between vaccinated and unvaccinated people.

In November 2021, against the backdrop of surging COVID-19 cases and a vaccination rate lagging behind that of other EU countries, chancellor-in-waiting Olaf Scholz "signaled his sympathy" for introducing mandatory COVID-19 vaccination as early as February 2022, according to an official close to Scholz. The outgoing Merkel government also proposed the possibility of a mandate. On 8 December, the day of assuming office, Scholz announced his intention to make COVID-19 vaccination mandatory, a view he repeated in parliament on 12 January 2022.

On 10 December 2021, an amendment to the Infection Protection Act was passed in parliament which included a vaccine mandate for health workers in hospitals, nursing homes, doctors' offices, facilities for people with disabilities, and other health facilities to show proof of vaccination or recovery from COVID-19. The mandate took effect on 15 March 2022. Implementation however extended into the following weeks, due in part to some local health authorities allowing latitude in considering individual cases. It withstood legal challenges, finally so in March 2022. Bavaria postponed the implementation indefinitely.

While the German Ethics Council said on 22 December 2021 that it favored an extension of the vaccine mandate to all adults, legal obstacles and the absence of a timeline for the introduction of pertaining legislation led observers to predict in early 2022 that a general mandate would be unlikely before September. On 4 April, days before a vote in the Bundestag was scheduled, the initiative for a general vaccine mandate was effectively shelved, with a group of 237 parliamentarians who had favored it switching to proposing instead a mandate for those aged 50 and over. On 5 April, the proposal was amended to lift the age threshold to 60 years. The failure of the amended proposal, which had been supported by chancellor Scholz and health minister Lauterbach, at the Bundestag vote on 7 April for which foreign minister Annalena Baerbock had been recalled by Scholz to participate, was considered a major defeat for the chancellor and his governing coalition. A recent opinion poll had found 60 per cent of Germans to be supporting a vaccine mandate. Lauterbach expressed his regret about this decision.

== Rapid coronavirus testing ==
On 24 July 2020, authorities announced that Germany would offer free voluntary coronavirus tests to all returning holidaymakers, with arrivals from 130 designated high-risk countries being eligible for tests on the same day. Testing facilities would be set up at airports.

From 8 March 2021, a week later than had been anticipated by health minister Spahn in mid-February, the government footed the bill for one weekly rapid test per resident, to be administered by trained personnel. The rationale for the free-of-charge tests, also referred to as Bürgertests (citizen tests), was to avoid stricter pandemic measures during the severe COVID-19 wave of that time. By early August 2021, the cost for the government incurred by the free rapid tests had reached over 3 billion euros. The Federal Ministry of Health suggested the end of free rapid tests in October.

On 10 August 2021, after meeting the 16 state premiers, chancellor Merkel announced that free COVID-19 tests would end on 11 October 2021, except for children, teenagers, and those with medical conditions which make them ineligible for vaccination. Chancellor Merkel justified this decision by saying that the government was now able to offer vaccines to every German citizen.

On 8 November 2021, it was reported that the prospective future government parties of the traffic light coalition – the SPD, the Alliance 90/The Greens and the FDP – had agreed to make rapid coronavirus tests again free of charge; on 12 November 2021, health minister Spahn announced that this would be implemented from the following day.

On 24 June 2022, health minister Lauterbach announced that daily rapid tests would remain free of charge from 30 June only for risk groups, with others having to pay a contribution of 3 euros per test from that date. Lauterbach expressed his regret about the decision, citing the financial burden of about one billion euros per month had the free tests for all been continued.

All remaining Bürgertest centers ceased to operate with effect from 1 March 2023.

The free coronavirus testing scheme, which allowed private operators to receive government funding, led to multiple cases of fraud. The Berlin State Criminal Police Office estimated the damage to be between one and one and a half billion euros. The limitation of tests from July 2022, together with a reduction in government subsidy, was intended to end fraud once and for all.

On 5 August 2022, the National Association of Statutory Health Insurance Physicians (NASHIP) announced that it would suspend payouts to coronavirus testing centers, due to what NASHIP said were unresolved legal questions regarding its responsibility in case of fraud under the new regulations in force since 30 June. A spokesperson for the Chambers of Pharmacists and Pharmacists' Associations called the decision a "scandal".

== Economic stimulus measures ==
On 1 March 2020, finance minister Olaf Scholz stated that the government was prepared for a stimulus package to mitigate the economic impact of the pandemic. On 3 March, Markus Söder, Minister President of Bavaria and leader of the CSU, and the German Minister for Economics, Peter Altmaier, pushed for financial help for companies affected by the virus. On 9 March, Angela Merkel's administration announced measures to cushion the economic blow.

On 6 April 2020, the KfW launched a new Quick Loan Program (Schnellkredit) in response to the effects of the pandemic on small businesses. The program presented benefits like two free years of repayment, 10-year period to repay the loan, and the KfW would assume one hundred per cent of the risk from the loan. The maximum amounts a company could apply for under the program were 675,000 euros for companies with less than 10 employees, 1,125,000 euros for companies between 10 and 50 employees, and up to 1,800,000 euros for companies with more than 50 employees. According to the IMF, state guarantees were 24.8% of Germany's 2020 GDP.

On 22 April, the federal cabinet approved the German stability programme. This programme presented a projection of the government's planned budgetary spending to deal with the COVID-19 crisis. The planned package pledged 60% of their 2019 GDP in fiscal impulse (job and wage security), tax deferrals, and liquidity assistance. Their proposed package was larger than other country's like the United States, the United Kingdom and France. The programme included plans to spend 3.5 billion euros on health equipment and vaccine development, as well as presenting funding for job security and loan plans with the KfW.

On 12 June, the federal government adopted a €130 billion stimulus package which included a temporary reduction in VAT until the end of 2020, and a bonus for families with children amounting to €300 per child, to be paid in two instalments of €150 in September and October 2020. The measure was informally referred by Scholz as Wumms or "oomph", a term that took hold in German public discourse. The German parliament passed the package on 29 June.

On 8 July, economy minister Peter Altmaier announced the release of non-repayable bridging funds for medium-sized companies with annual turnover not exceeding €750 million which have been affected by the COVID-19 crisis. The amount of aid depends on revenue lost, and on the number of employees. Companies have to apply for the funds through their tax advisors or auditors, a step that was intended to safeguard from abuse of the scheme, also in view of evidence that aid that had been made available at the beginning of the crisis had been misused. On occasion of presenting the scheme, Altmaier stated that he expected some sectors of the economy to return to a phase of growth from October 2020.

To mitigate the impact of the second lockdown from November 2020 on businesses, the self-employed, and associations and institutions who were required to close, the German government introduced an "umbrella" scheme, initially with an estimated budget of €30 billion. The scheme, termed Novemberhilfe (November aid), received approval under the Temporary Framework of the European Commission. With the lockdown continuing into January 2021, further aid was made available under new schemes. As with the Novemberhilfe and the measures earlier agreed in July 2021, companies were usually required to lodge applications for these funds through tax advisors or auditors. The complex and changing rules for eligibility for funding led to complaints by these professions that they were overburdened.

According to records published by the Federal Ministry for Economic Affairs and Climate Action (BMWi) in late December 2021, Germany had to date spent 130 billion euros on supporting the economy, with about 60 billion and 55 billion granted as subsidies and loans, respectively. The document cited information from the Federal Ministry of Labour and Social Affairs according to which the latter had paid out about 24 billion Kurzarbeit support (Kurzarbeitergeld) and about 18 billion for social benefits related to the Kurzarbeit scheme, in total in 2020 and 2021. The BMWi said that these and other supporting measures would be continued into the first months of 2022.

At the second anniversary of the beginning of the pandemic in Germany in January 2022, the German Economic Institute estimated the economic loss resulting from the pandemic to be 350 billion euros. This was due to reduced consumption and secondarily, due to reduced investment activity. For the first three months of 2022, the experts considered an additional loss of 50 billion euros to be possible. They projected that economic recovery would take years. In a press release in February 2022, the Ifo Institute for Economic Research estimated the total costs of the coronavirus crisis for the years 2020 and 2021 to be 330 billion euros.

== Court rulings ==
In the first weeks of the pandemic, the major restrictions on personal freedoms that were a consequence of governmental anti-pandemic measures were not subject to substantial criticism by the judiciary. For example, the High Administrative Court of Bavaria (Bayerischer Verwaltungsgerichtshof) on 30 March 2020 upheld the particularly stringent restrictions in the state, citing the limited understanding of pandemic risk as reason. The regulation during the first wave that shops and retailers were – with few exceptions – not allowed to operate if their sales area exceeded 800 square metres was challenged in several states, but successes of the challenges were in several cases reversed by higher courts. One of the arguments of the higher courts was that shops were able to continue to operate, and therefore limit their economic losses, by restricting their sales area to below the 800 square metre threshold.

On 16 April 2020, the Federal Constitutional Court ruled that the governmental lockdown imposed in March did not allow blanket bans on rallies; a small protest in Giessen against the lockdown measures, the initial prohibition of which had prompted the court case, went ahead after the city mayor said that permission would be given.

As the first wave of the pandemic eased towards mid-2020 and pandemic risk was better understood, government measures were increasingly often ruled to be overly restrictive, and some were reversed. In what was seen by observers as a possible signal of this development, a lockdown in Gütersloh district was ordered to be halted by a court on 6 July 2020. By August 2020, administrative courts across Germany dealt with hundreds of cases challenging restrictions.

On 26 March 2021, the Karlsruhe social court ruled that a one-off payout of €150 to adult recipients of basic social income (commonly known in Germany as Hartz IV) eligible as of May 2021, was unconstitutional. The payout had been agreed upon in February by the ruling CDU/CSU and SPD coalition as a support measure in the pandemic. The court said that an increase of about €100 for each month of the pandemic was necessary.

On 30 November 2021, the Constitutional Court ruled that the federal emergency brake (Bundesnotbremse) anti-pandemic measures in force from April to late June 2021 had been legal. One of two rulings concerned curfews and contact restrictions, the other concerned school closures, and both dismissed several complaints that had been lodged by Christian Lindner and other members of his FDP party. In justifying its decision, the court pointed to the serious pandemic situation at that time, the availability of online instruction of school pupils in lieu of face-to-face teaching, and the temporary character of the measures.

On 28 December 2021, the Constitutional Court ruled that "without delay", provisions had to be made to prevent a discrimination of people with disabilities in case of triage becoming necessary due to a shortage of intensive care facilities. Nine people with disabilities and pre-existing conditions had filed complaints at the court. On 11 November 2022, the Bundestag in response passed a law that excluded age and disabilities as criteria in triage. After two separate legal challenges by professionals from intensive care medicine and emergency medicine, the Constitutional Court ruled in November 2025 that the previously enacted rules violated the constitutional right of freedom of profession, and were therefore void. It also ruled that any such rules would be a responsibility of the states, not the federal government. The chair of the German Ethics Council, Helmut Frister, expressed surprise about the new ruling, pointing out that the one from 2022 had not referred to the responsibility of individual states in these matters at all.

On 26 January 2022, the Constitutional Court dismissed a request by the AfD party to waive the vaccination requirement for access to the Bundestag parliament for the commemoration of International Holocaust Remembrance Day the following day. A 2G+ requirement had been in force in the Bundestag since 12 January, with the exception made for the visitors' gallery having been dropped for the remembrance day.

On 17 March 2023, the Oberverwaltungsgericht (state administrative high court) of North Rhine-Westphalia (NRW) ruled in favour of three self-employed plaintiffs, in that final advice by the NRW government to the three, which had cancelled part of earlier lump sum subsidies of 9,000 euros, was invalid. The court admonished the unclear wording of the initial advice sent out in 2020. Observers considered the ruling as being significant for similar cases at the federal level.

== Protective equipment ==
As was the case in other countries worldwide, at the beginning of the pandemic, Germany was faced with a severe shortage of protective materials. Various bodies of the medical profession, including the National Association of Statutory Health Insurance Physicians, had warned about this problem for private practices by 3 March 2020. On 4 March, the government crisis team considered the acquisition of more protection gear as an "extraordinary urgency". Germany prohibited the export of protection masks, gloves, and suits.

In March 2020 health minister Spahn was criticized for allegedly having ignored pre-pandemic warnings that shortages were imminent and that clinics needed more protective gears. The ministry said that it had talked about the supply situation with individual states and suppliers already in February, and had forwarded enquiries to the procurement office of the Bundeswehr as being responsible for coordinating the efforts. In late March, intensive care physicians criticised the lack of protective clothing in nursing services, clinics and doctors' practices as a state failure.

On 28 February 2020, the corona crisis team declared it would prepare a central acquisition by the government of protection masks and suits to create a reserve. To address the severe shortage of hand disinfectants, the Federal Agency for Chemicals within the Federal Institute for Occupational Safety and Health issued a general decree on 4 March 2020 which allowed pharmacies and pharmaceutical companies to produce and sell products based on isopropyl alcohol for this purpose.

To remedy the severage shortage of FFP2 masks, in late March 2020 the health ministry promised to any supplier who would be able to deliver at least 25,000 masks by 30 April 2020 that the government would buy them at a fixed price of 4,50 euros apiece. Due to no upper limit having been set on order size ("Open-House"-Verfahren, or Open House process), the government was faced with 700 supply contracts with a total volume of 6,4 billion euros, more than five times the budgeted amount of 1,2 billion euros. In multiple instances, payment for masks was rejected by the government on grounds of quality or delayed delivery, which was challenged from 2020 by around 100 suppliers. By August 2020, Spahn wanted to give away 250 million masks, because there were too many. On 19 January 2023, an administrative court in Cologne ruled that the health ministry had to disclose its files from 2020 relating to the measure.

In June 2025, a confidential report by special investigator Margarethe Sudhof, parts of which were seen by media, strengthened accusations leveled previously against Spahn that the logistics firm which had been tasked with distributing the masks in the early stage of the pandemic had been chosen without competitive bidding. The logistics firm had ultimately been unable to deal with the amount of masks provided.

In late March 2020, Stephan Pusch, the District Administrator of Heinsberg, asked the Chinese president for help with protective equipment, because the reserve of masks and protective gowns would last only a few more days. Hospitals and doctors urged the government again to address the lack of masks and other protection gear. Berlin received 8000 masks from the nation's central provisioning, which would mean only one mask for every doctor's practice. Of the ten million masks promised by health minister Spahn, only 150,000 had arrived.

A delivery of 6 million protective masks of type FFP2 ordered by German customs authorities did not arrive in Germany on 20 March 2020 as scheduled. They were reported missing at a Kenyan airport; it was unclear why they had been in Kenya. 10 million protective masks had been ordered by the central provisioning altogether. The lack of protective equipment, especially of face masks and disinfectants, led hospitals to re-use disposable masks. Undertakers requested protective equipment and raising their status to being relevant for the system to get priority access to protective gear. Most dentists practices did not have FFP2 masks and some considered closing their practices.

=== "Masken-Affäre" and corruption ===
In May 2022, it was reported that CSU politicians Alfred Sauter und Georg Nüßlein had received around 1.2 million Euro each and Andrea Tandler, entrepreneuring daughter of Gerold Tandler even 48 million Euro in provision for negotiating deals with FFP2 masks.

In July 2022, the protective mask industry in Germany, which had started early in the pandemic with government subsidies of millions of euros, was predicted to likely falter and the dependency on mask imports from China to likely revert to the pre-pandemic state by 2025. The main reason cited was that the imports from China were much cheaper, with public authorities and hospitals usually obliged to take the cheapest offer.

In 2022, Bavarian state premier Markus Söder (CSU) was accused of having facilitated the purchase of ten million surgical masks and three million FFP2 masks from China in spite of rejection by two ministries due to quality concerns. The contract, which contained a clause regarding quality, had been finalized on 31 March 2020. Delivery of the FFP2 masks had dragged out to the end of the year after some types of masks had been prohibited by state authorities. Head of the Bavarian State Chancellery Florian Herrmann and former Federal Minister of Transport and Digital Infrastructure Andreas Scheuer defended the purchase which they had pushed together with Söder, citing the crisis situation at that time and pointing to no provisions having been paid; the latter claim appeared to be corroborated by a team of investigative journalists, and contrasted with the "mask scandal" over which two other MPs had previously resigned.

== Protests ==
=== Querdenken movement ===
Numerous protests against governmental anti-pandemic measures took place throughout Germany. Protesters – soon known as Querdenken (lateral thinking) movement, after the name of a group that had held its first rally in Stuttgart in April 2020 – opposed these measures as they saw them as infringing on citizens' liberties. Otherwise protesters had generally little common ground. Right-wing radical views gained influence in the movement, which in view of observers was partly aided by the use of the pejorative term Corona-Diktatur (corona dictatorship) by members of the right-wing populist AfD party.

In its first year, the movement mobilised tens of thousands for rallies; on 1 August 2020, some 20,000 people protested in Berlin.

=== Other protests ===
On 29 March 2020, in Berlin and Hamburg two demonstrations for the adoption of more refugees were considered a violation of the contact ban and were dispersed by police forces.

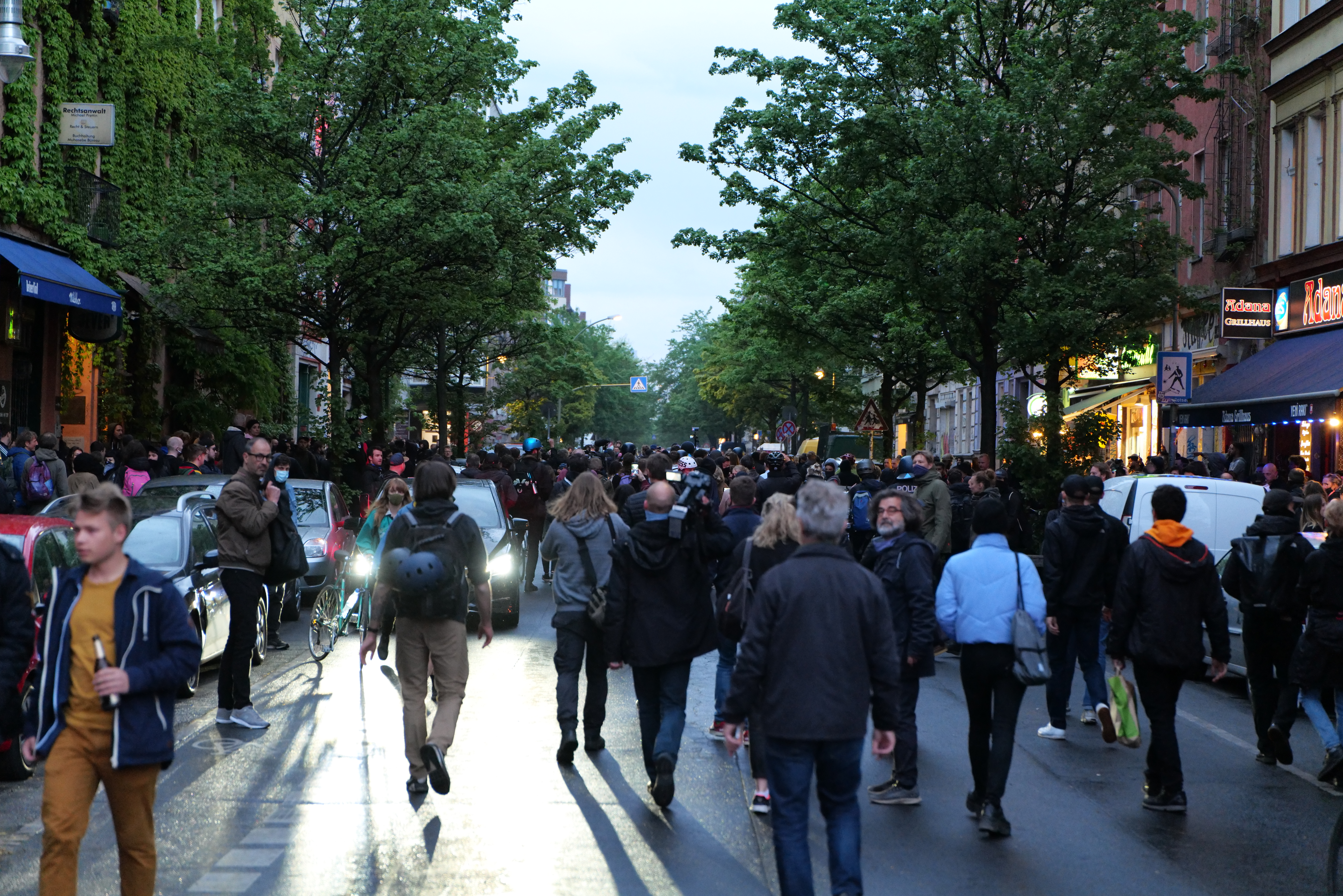
May Day protest in Kreuzberg in 2020

On 1 May 2020, when the German Trade Union Confederation did not hold its traditional demonstrations throughout Germany, a number of authorised and unauthorised gatherings took place in Berlin, Hamburg, Leipzig, Frankfurt and other German cities. In Berlin, 27 authorised protests were held, each capped at a maximum of 20 participants. On May Day in Kreuzberg, several thousand protesters or spectators took part in demonstrations which, while unauthorised, were largely left alone by the police. Most of those gathered appeared to keep a safe distance from each other; however, from the early evening onwards, many hundreds were observed not to do so, leading Berlin's Senator for the Interior Andreas Geisel to sharply condemn the protesters for their "geballte Unvernunft" ("bunched-up lack of common sense").

== Assessment of government response ==
=== During the pandemic ===
Some observers considered the chancellor and state premier meetings from the beginning of the pandemic as effectively circumventing parliament, while others disagreed, citing the liveliness of the debating culture even during the early stages of the pandemic, and comparing the actions taken with the handling of the European debt crisis by the government in 2009.

In an interview with Neue Zürcher Zeitung in October 2020, the former chair of the Constitutional Court, Hans-Jürgen Papier, opined that a large majority of parliamentarians had been too reticent in asserting the role of the Bundestag in pandemic decision making, in spite of the Administrative Court of Bavaria having demanded as early as April 2020 that longer-term lockdowns be enacted by parliament. He also said that the regular meetings of chancellor Merkel and the state governors, the so-called Bund-Länder-Konferenz, had created an "obvious discrepancy between political reality and constitutional law", and that there were no provisions for such a panel in the constitution (the Grundgesetz). Around the same time, Florian Post, legal expert of the SPD, as well as several parliamentarians of the CDU expressed similar concerns about what they saw as diminished role of parliament. The powers held by individual states as provided for in the Grundgesetz, including their independence in implementing anti-pandemic measures, always remained in force.

About the anti-pandemic measures themselves, Papier said in the October 2020 interview that "many" of them were unproblematic from the viewpoint of constitutional law, while others did not satisfy the principle of proportionality.

The January 2022 ordinance which had devolved the decision on the validity of vaccination certificates to the Robert Koch Institute and the Paul Ehrlich Institute was sharply criticized. The ordinance was rescinded weeks after it came into effect.

=== After the pandemic ===
==== Early assessments ====
In late January 2023, health minister Lauterbach described the extended closure of schools and daycare centers during the first waves of the pandemic as a "mistake" but considered an apology by the government as "difficult", as the decisions of that time had been based on the available expertise on the pandemic, which "often" had been "not good enough". He said that Germany had learned a lot from the pandemic, and was therefore much better prepared for a future one. Lauterbach repeated his criticism of the closures on 9 February, on which occasion he also said that a "twisting of facts" by some media outlets, parties, Querdenker and scientists had prevented a higher vaccination rate in the older age groups, leading to avoidable deaths. He also denounced some anti-pandemic rules enacted by individual states, especially Bavaria. He expressed an overall positive view of how the country had gotten through nearly three years of the pandemic. FDP deputy leader Wolfgang Kubicki criticized Lauterbach sharply, saying that the latter had been one of those who had shut out critical voices from science, had stoked panic, and had stretched the limits of constitutional law.

==== Reappraisal ====
In early 2024, voices calling for a reappraisal of the government response to the pandemic grew louder. That debate intensified after a German online magazine published RKI protocols in March 2024, claiming that it had obtained them in court under German freedom of information laws. Health minister Lauterbach said on 27 March that he was open to a reappraisal, but that the government should ponder the question of what would be the most appropriate form for it. He denied having had any part in the barring of information in passages of the protocols, which he said the RKI had been forced to under freedom of information laws; he said that in the interest of transparency, the relevant persons would be contacted and the barring would be removed in a new version of the protocols, tentatively to be published in four weeks, in which the barred passages would be made readable "to the greatest extent". On 23 July 2024, the protocols from 2020 to 2023 with no blacked-out passages were published by an independent journalist. In May, the RKI had published the protocols from January 2020 until April 2021 with some passages still blacked out. Lauterbach said that the RKI had intended to publish the whole protocols after legal issues were cleared, and that the RKI had "nothing to hide" in spite of the early publication from elsewhere.

On 9 October 2024, SPD party whip Katja Mast said that there would be no additional reappraisal of the government's COVID-19 response during the current legislative period, citing the failure of the two co-governing parties SPD and FDP to reach a consensus on modalities.

In a January 2025 interview with German weekly Stern, president Steinmeier called for a review of Germany's pandemic response to be carried out after the 2025 federal election, saying that this was "urgent", and that it would "create the chance to win back people who had lost their trust in democracy or at least doubted it". If a new government and Bundestag did not address this matter, he would install a commission of inquiry himself.

In June 2025, the governing grand coalition agreed to set up an Enquiry Commission (Enquete-Kommission) to reappraise its measures during the pandemic. On 10 July 2025, the Bundestag decided to establish such a commission, titled Aufarbeitung der Corona-Pandemie und Lehren für zukünftige pandemische Ereignisse (Reappraisal of the coronavirus pandemic and lessons for future pandemic events). The commission, comprising 14 members of the Bundestag and 14 experts, commenced its work in September 2025 under the leadership of Franziska Hoppermann.

==== Procurement of masks in early 2020 ====
In late June 2025, former health minister Spahn had to answer questions from the Budget Committee over his procurement of masks in early 2020 at very high prices. The potential expenses for the health ministry resulting from over 100 court cases by mask suppliers whose orders had been rejected by the government were estimated to run to 2.3 billion euros, or possibly up to 3.5 billion euros with interest and legal expenses added. The publishing of the former figure had prompted health minister Lauterbach, Spahn's successor, to initiate a reappraisal of the procurement of masks under the direction of Margarethe Sudhof. On 5 July, several media carried details of a 168-page report by Sudhof that had previously been released by Health Minister Nina Warken only in redacted form. The published passages stirred a heated debate about the decisions by Spahn, with the Greens alleging that Warken had deliberately tried to conceal his responsibility in the procurement. Spahn called the allegations "malicious insinuations", and insisted that he had not conducted any negotiations for mask procurement. The creation of an investigating committee (Untersuchungsausschuss) was considered unlikely by observers, due to the rejection of the Greens and the Left Party to vote together with the AfD in this matter.

==== Different measures ====
A 2021 analysis of Germany’s health workforce planning during the pandemic found significant differences across the country’s 16 federal states in how capacity was expanded and how health workers were deployed. Although each state had a pandemic preparedness plan, most were only partially updated to address COVID-19 specifically, and few included concrete staffing or strategies. Measures to expand the workforce, such as recruiting retirees, medical students, and foreign-trained nurses, were implemented unevenly across states. Only one state, Rhineland-Palatinate, formally adopted a task-shifting policy in long-term care, allowing lower-qualified staff to perform nursing tasks under supervision. The federal government’s Infection Control Act temporarily permitted such delegation nationwide but was interpreted differently among the states.In addition to capacity expansion, some regions introduced training programs to increase intensive-care staff. Rhineland-Palatinate, financed 180-hour “fast-track” courses for nurses and physicians to help operate new intensive-care beds. Germany’s pandemic coordination shifted repeatedly between local autonomy and central control. Germany’s intergovernmental system switch back and forth between two types of multi-level governance: a territorial model (MLG I) emphasizing local decision-making and a functional model (MLG II) based on vertical coordination and federal direction. During the first wave, the federal and state governments initially relied on local authorities and county-level health offices to manage outbreaks, but later moved toward a more centralized approach when infection rates rose. By mid-2020, as case numbers declined, decision-making was again delegated to the states and municipalities, leading to more diverse local measures and adaptations.

==== Psychosocial burden ====
In addition to capacity expansion and deployment strategies, an important yet under-emphasized dimension of the pandemic response in Germany was the psychosocial burden and long-term health impact on care-home and healthcare staff, which in many cases threatened the sustainability of workforce policies. During the pandemic, nurses in long-term care homes experienced a steep rise in stress, anxiety and depression: in a survey of 811 care-home nurses across Germany undertaken between November 2020 and February 2021, 94.2% reported that workload had increased, and 59.1% exhibited clinically relevant levels of stress, anxiety or depression. Qualitative interviews with nursing-home staff further highlighted how protective-equipment requirements, frequent outbreaks, high mortality among residents, visitor bans and conflict with relatives compounded psychological strain and intensified burnout risk. Moreover, many health and social-care workers who contracted COVID-19 themselves reported persistent symptoms that impaired their ability to return to full work capacity; a national follow-up survey found that among 2,053 workers with documented SARS-CoV-2 infection, nearly 73% experienced symptoms lasting more than three months, frequently resulting in reduced work ability and lower quality of life. These health and psychosocial consequences undermined workforce retention and added a structural layer to staffing shortages, suggesting that, beyond immediate recruitment and reallocation measures, long-term workforce planning must also address occupational health, mental-health support, reintegration after long-Covid, and improvements in working conditions to sustain resilience in future health crises.

== Timeline ==
=== January 2020 ===
On 22 January 2020, the German government considered the spread of COVID-19 as a "very low health risk" for Germans and the virus in general as "far less dangerous" than SARS. New travel advisories would not be necessary.

On 27 January, after the first infections in Germany, the government continued to regard the probability of a spread as "very low". Even if individual cases emerged, authorities would be able to treat them.

At a press conference on 28 January, the Federal Minister of Health, Jens Spahn, stated that he was only worrying about conspiracy theories that were circulating on the Internet, and that the Federal Government would counter this problem through full transparency. Hotlines were established to calm down worried callers. After a case was suspected in a Lufthansa plane, the company suspended all flights to China.

On 29 January, the government ordered pilots of flights from China to describe the health status of their passengers and ordered passengers to fill in a contact document. The government and health authorities expected more isolated cases but were confident to prevent further spread.

=== February 2020 ===
On 1 February, health minister Spahn warned that people infected with the Coronavirus and their contacts might be stigmatised and be socially excluded. He emphasised that the Germans evacuated from China would all be healthy.

On 13 February, at a meeting of EU health ministers, Spahn dismissed travel restrictions from or to China by single member states. He decidedly rejected measuring the temperature of inbound travellers.

On 26 February, following the confirmation of multiple COVID-19 cases in North Rhine-Westphalia, Heinsberg initiated closure of schools, swimming pools, libraries and the town hall until 2 March. Games and training for FC Wegberg-Beeck were suspended. The Cologne-Wahn military airport was temporarily closed. The German government opted not to implement travel restrictions on Italy over the coronavirus pandemic there. It also considered itself "far from" issuing a travel warning for the country, which would have enabled free cancellation of trips.

On 28 February, Heinsberg extended closure of daycare facilities and schools to 6 March. The officials imposed a 14-day home isolation for people who had had direct contacts with individuals in the current cases as well as people who showed flu symptoms. On the same day, Germany enacted new health security measures to include regulations for air and sea travel, requiring passengers from China, South Korea, Japan, Italy and Iran to report their health status before entry. Train railway companies must report passengers with symptoms to authorities and the federal police would step up checks within 30 kilometres of the border. On 28 February the government said that not all events should be cancelled.

=== March 2020 ===
==== 1–7 March ====
On 1 March, the number of confirmed infections almost doubled within one day. Health minister Jens Spahn recommended that people with symptoms of a cold should avoid mass events.

On 2 March, the Robert Koch Institute raised its threat level for Germany to "moderate" and the European Centre for Disease Prevention and Control raised its threat level for Europe from "moderate" to "high". Spahn dismissed the closure of borders or companies or ending large events or direct flights between China and Germany as unnecessary or inappropriate.

In a parliamentary discussion on 4 March, Spahn warned that the consequences of fear could be far worse than the virus itself. Spokespersons of Greens and FDP praised the government for its management of the crisis. AfD leader Weidel disagreed and also proposed measuring fever at airports. SPD health policymaker Bärbel Bas stated that measuring fever made no sense because not every infected person has a fever.

On 5 March, the German Federal Office for Citizen Protection and Disaster Support (BBK) stated that the spread in Germany was "no catastrophe" and that citizens should prepare for real catastrophes instead.

On 6 March, Spahn ruled out "any measure leading to restrictions on travel" within the European Union and spoke out against closing all schools and universities in Germany. Spahn recommended not to make unnecessary travels and suggested people coming from risk areas should stay at home. Spahn participated in a meeting with the other European health ministers to discuss the crisis. The EU and Robert Koch Institute emphasised that masks and disinfectants should not be used by healthy private persons.

In March, Germany banned prostitution for the duration of the pandemic. From the second half of 2021 it was permitted again, with conditions differing across states, while the ban on street prostitution remained in place.

==== 8–14 March ====
On 8 March, health minister Spahn recommended to cancel events of more than 1,000 attendees for the time being. Several states promptly followed this recommendation, leading to Germany's Ice Hockey league DEL announcing the immediate cancellation of the 2019–2020 season and to several Bundesliga derbies to be played behind closed doors, a first in the 57-year history of the Bundesliga.

On 9 March, Germany reported the first two deaths. The number of COVID-19 infections had nearly doubled to more than 1200 within the last few days. Merkel, who had publicly kept a low profile regarding the outbreak, emphasised it was important to slow down the spread and buy time. The health minister emphasised the responsibility of each individual to slow down spread and ruled out preemptive closing of daycare centres or schools.

On 10 March, chancellor Merkel predicted that between 60 and 70 per cent of Germans would get the virus, an estimate already made nine days earlier by the head virologist of the Charité, Christian Drosten.

On 11 March, having faced accusations of inaction the previous days, Merkel took the unusual step of dedicating an entire press conference on the topic of the COVID-19 crisis. She emphasised "We will do the necessary, as a country and in the European Union". She announced liquidity support for companies, especially via the German development bank KfW, to be realised before the week was over. She insisted again on not closing borders. Merkel recommended everyone avoid shaking hands, for example by looking a second longer and smiling instead. The German health minister added that mouth protection and disinfectants were needless for individuals and that it was enough to wash hands with soap rigorously. Shops noted a great increase in demand for provisions and sanitary products. Several members of the Bundestag for the SPD were placed under quarantine, including epidemiologist and Member of Parliament Karl Lauterbach, after attending a meeting on 2 March with a staff member of the German Ministry of Justice later testing positive for coronavirus.

Although neighbouring countries had already closed schools, German Minister of Education Anja Karliczek rejected a nationwide closure of schools, while stating that the decision would need to be re-assessed daily as the pandemic evolved. The Kultusministerkonferenz debated whether the virus could threaten the upcoming Abitur school-leaving examination. Its director, Stefanie Hubig, decided the oral examinations in Rhineland-Palatinate between 16 and 25 March would take place according to plan. She also recommended cancelling class trips to risk areas.

On 13 March 14 of the 16 German federal states decided to close their schools and nurseries for the next few weeks. Germany rushed to order 10,000 ventilators from Drägerwerk for intensive respiratory care, twice the order size of Italy and equivalent to the production of a whole year. Germany entered talks for softening its export stop of protective gear for other European Union states. The government decided to give financial support to artists, private cultural institutions and event companies that struggle in the crisis. Scholz and Altmeier assured unlimited credits to all companies of any size.

On 14 March, the number of confirmed infections had increased to 4,585, including nine fatalities. Several federal states widened their measures to limit public activities. For example, Berlin, Schleswig-Holstein and Saarland closed bars among other leisure venues. Cologne forbid all events in the city centre.

==== 15–21 March ====
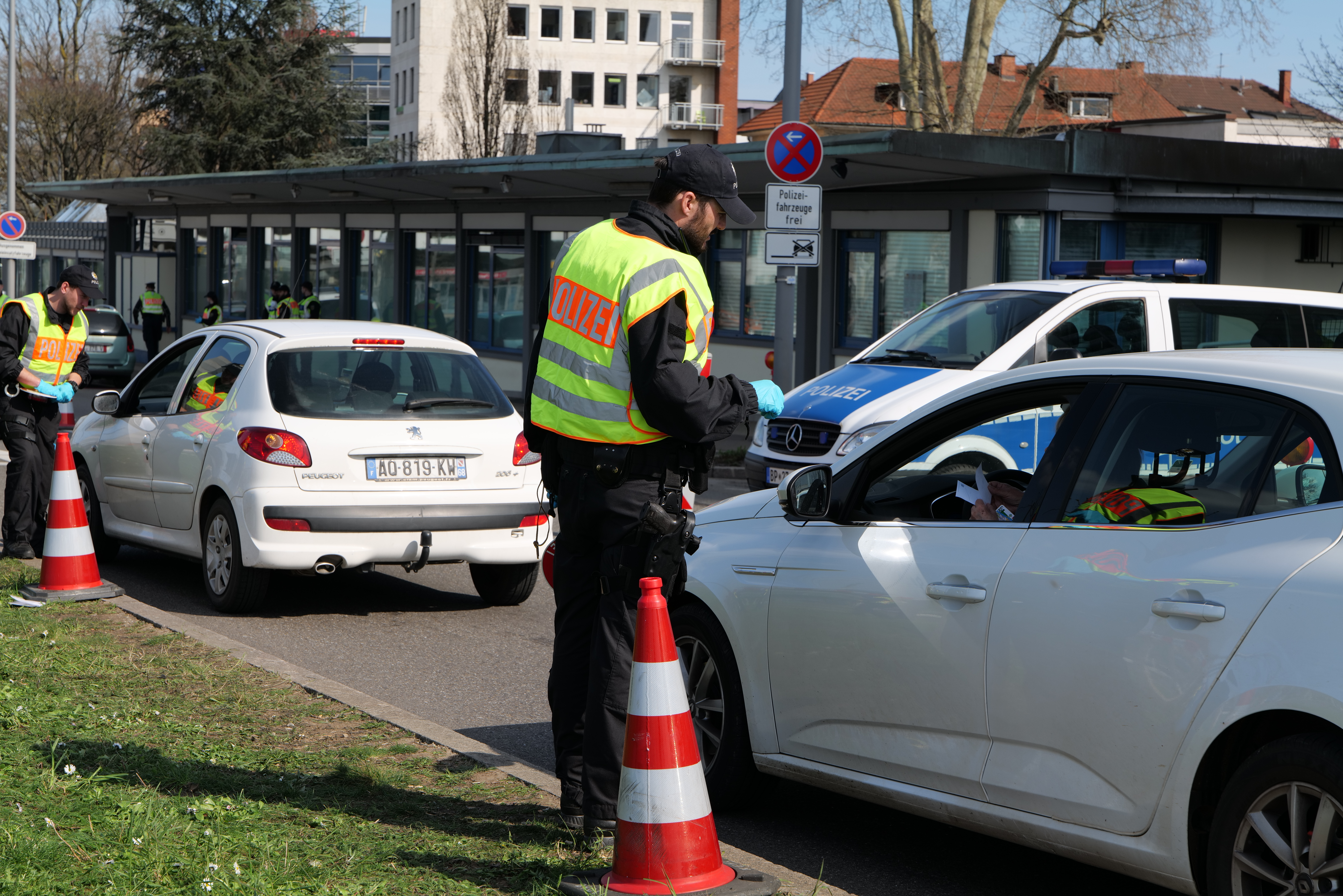
Control at the border to France at the Europe Bridge in Kehl on 16 March 2020

On 15 March, local elections in Bavaria took place amid the crisis. Many election workers dropped out so that the elections were "acutely threatened" and teachers had to be conscripted on one day's notice. German Interior Minister Horst Seehofer announced the closing of the borders with France, Switzerland, Austria, Denmark and Luxembourg. The measure would begin on 16 March and the transportation of goods and commuters would be exempt. Deutsche Bahn decided to reduce its regional traffic and, to protect its staff, suspended further ticket inspections.

On 16 March, the state of Bavaria declared a state of emergency for 14 days and introduced measures to limit public movement and provide additional funds for medicine supplies. Bavarian minister president Markus Söder ordered closures of all sports and leisure facilities starting on 17 March. Restaurants were ordered to limit their dine-in opening hours to before 3:00 pm; to ensure a minimum distance of 1.5 metres between guests; and to accommodate a maximum of 30 guests. Supermarkets, chemist's shops, banks, pet shops, and all businesses that sell essential basic needs are allowed extended opening times including on Sundays, while non-essential shops are to be closed at all times.

Italian scientists, including virologist Roberto Burioni, warned Germany against underestimating the danger and the director of Eurac Research stated that Germany needed a lockdown or the numbers would go out of control. In the evening, Merkel announced measures similar to Bavaria for the entire country, agreed on by all federal states and the ruling coalition. This also included a prohibition on travelling in coaches, attending religious meetings, visiting playgrounds or engaging in tourism. The government stressed it was no "shutdown".

On 17 March, Germany along with the European Union closed its borders to travellers from outside the bloc for 30 days, with exceptions for some European countries and designated essential purposes, and advised its citizens not to travel abroad. Inbound travel to Frankfurt Airport was suspended the same evening. Chancellor Merkel also stated that the European Commission had begun work on a collective tender for medical gear.

Limits on the testing capacity and a delay of three to four days meant reported case numbers were significantly lower than the actual ones. Employment agencies and job centres reported a tenfold increase in calls and had to relax sanctions. Berlin announced the plan to construct a hospital with the Bundeswehr for housing 1000 beds for COVID-19 patients. The Federal and State Governments agreed on a new emergency plan for German hospitals which includes doubling the current capacity of 28,000 intensive care beds, of which 25,000 are equipped with ventilation. After a man tested positive in a refugee centre in Suhl, a quarantine led to days of protest, physical resistance and escape attempts over fences or the sewage system. In an SEK operation with protection suits and tanks, 200 police forces calmed the situation and relocated 17 offenders. The Interior Minister of Lower Saxony warned that untrue news could trigger panic buying and conflicts, and demanded laws to punish publishing wrong information regarding the supply situation, including the medical one, or aspects of the virus.

On 18 March, in an unprecedented step, chancellor Angela Merkel addressed people in Germany in a televised speech dedicated to the pandemic situation. Describing the pandemic as Germany's biggest post-war challenge, she urged them to recognize the seriousness of the threat, to support the sweeping restrictions on public life, and to refrain from panic buying. The speech was later described as "historic" and praised as a "model of rhetoric".

Also on 18 March, Germany widened its travel restrictions to EU citizens from Italy, Switzerland, Denmark, Luxembourg and Spain, who had up to that time been able to arrive by flight or ship. Germany still received flights from Iran and China due to bilateral agreements, although the German ministry of transportation had stated two days earlier that it would forbid passenger flights from there. The passengers were not tested for the virus and their temperatures were not taken due to the absence of administrative orders. The head of the Robert Koch Institute warned that the number of infected could rise to up to ten million in two months unless social contacts were reduced significantly, and called for a minimum distance of 1.5 metres to be maintained in all direct contact. The government began to bring back thousands of German travellers stranded in non-EU countries with charter flights. The public health insurance companies assured to cover all expenses related to the crisis with no limitation.

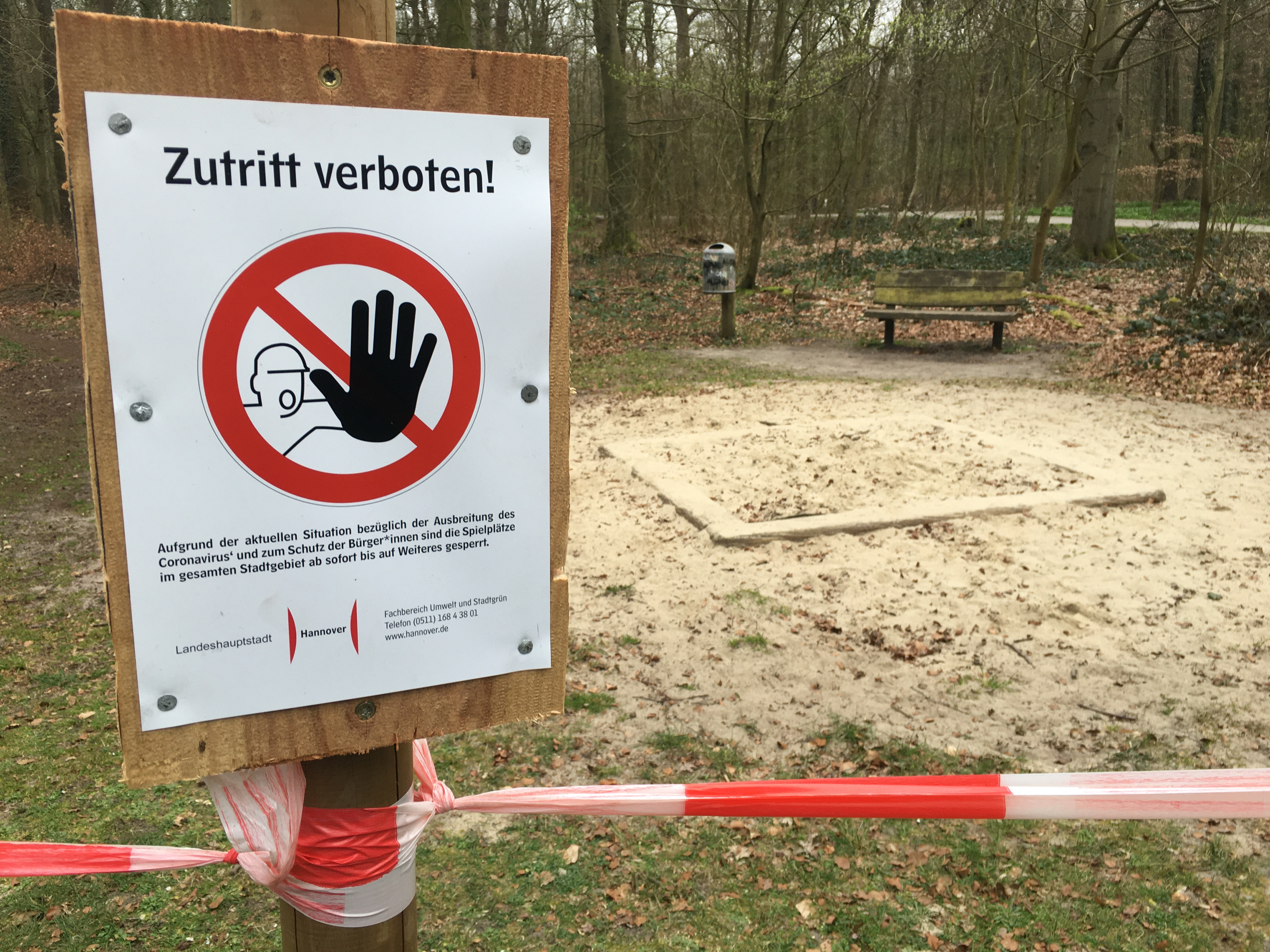
Closed playground in Hannover. On 16 March, going to playgrounds was forbidden.

On 19 March, discussions of the Minister presidents of the German states and Merkel regarding a curfew were set for 22 March.

On 20 March, Bavaria was the first state to declare a curfew, inspired by and identical to Austria, where it had been implemented four days before. The Bavarian curfew would begin at midnight and fine violators up to €25,000. It would remain permitted to go to work as well as to supermarkets, medics and pharmacies, under the condition that the trip is solitary or with housemates. Under the same condition, it is also permitted to do sports outside; to visit the life partner or aged, sick or disabled people who do not live in a facility; and to help others in general or provide for animals. Restaurants except drive-ins and for take-away, DIY shops and hairdressers would be shut down. The Federal government scheduled a discussion for 22 March to decide on a nationwide curfew and still faced opposition from the German Association of Towns and Municipalities and reservations, among others from the Governing Mayor of Berlin, Michael Müller, or Minister President of Thuringia, Bodo Ramelow. Annalena Baerbock, chairwoman of the Greens, criticised Bavaria's introduction of the curfew as counter-productive, saying there should not be a competition of which federal state is the fastest and strictest and that there would already be a round of voting on this question with all the federal states and the chancellor in two days. Starting also at midnight, the state of Saarland, a region close France's badly affected Grand Est region, also put a similar curfew into place.

On 21 March, after more and more residents of refugee centres tested positive for the virus, asylum seekers were unsettled. In Suhl, some threw stones at the police, threatened to set the residence on fire, and used children as human shields. Refugee organisations demanded smaller residencies, including accommodation in hotels and hostels. According to data collected on 17–18 March 2020 spending behaviour in a sample of 2500 people in Germany, with an age range from 16 to 65 years confirmed panic buying, showing a 35% increase in the purchase of noodles, 34% increase in canned food, and sanitiser (+33%), a 30% increase in frozen food, mineral water and soap, as well as a slightly lower degree in prepackaged meals (+8%), toilet paper 26%, facial tissue +24% and medication +19%.

==== 22–29 March ====
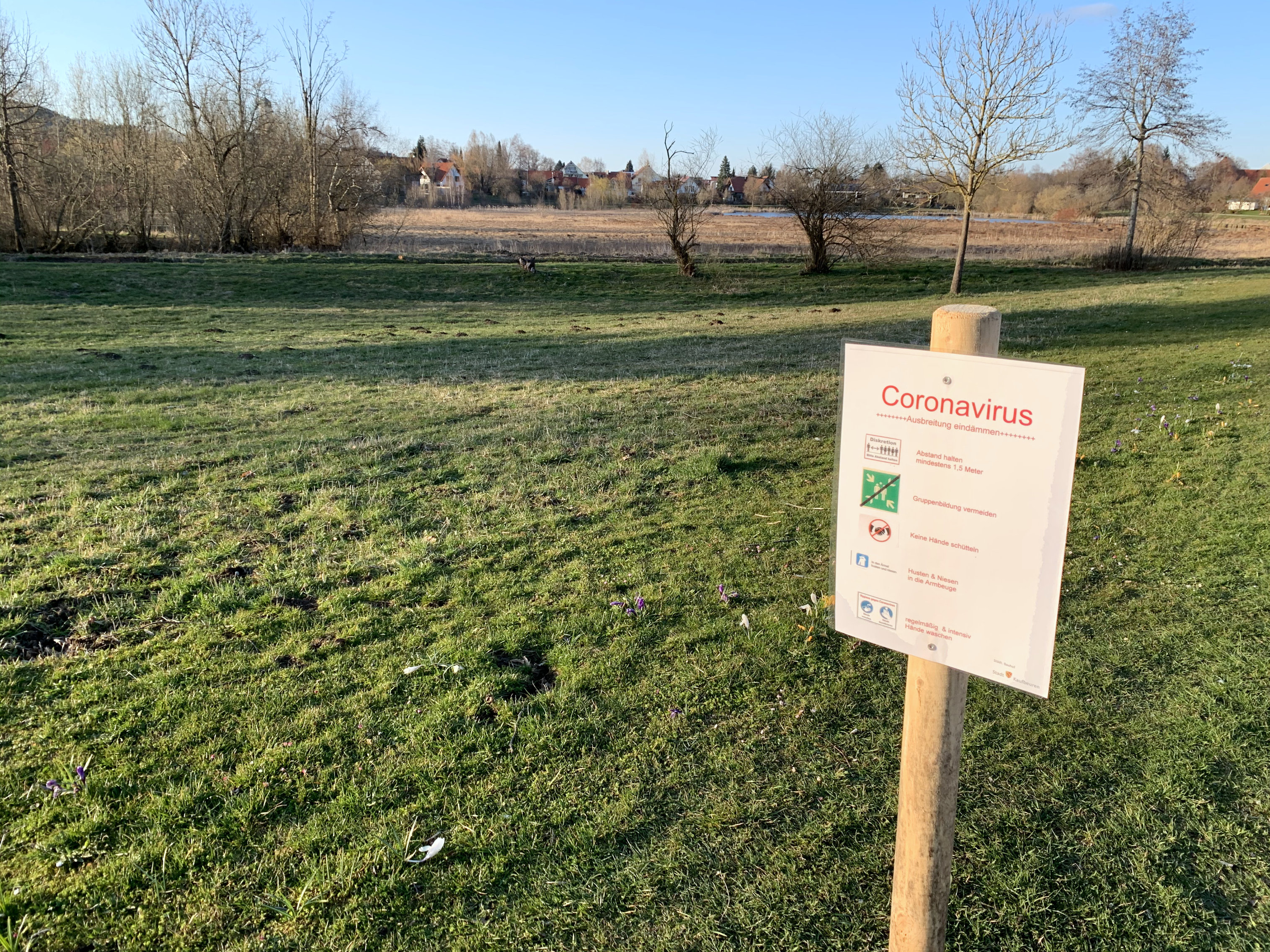
Warning sign at a footpath in Kaufbeuren

On 22 March, the government and the federal states agreed for at least two weeks to forbid gatherings of more than two people and require a minimum distance of 1.5 metres (4 ft 11 in) between people in public except for families, partners or people living in the same household. Restaurants and services like hairdressers were to be closed. Individual states and districts were allowed to impose stricter measures than these. Saxony joined Bavaria and the Saarland in prohibiting residents from leaving their dwellings except for good reasons, which are similar to the ones in the other two states; outdoor exercise is permitted under the new rules only alone or in groups of maximal five members of the same household.

Chancellor Merkel was quarantined because the physician who had vaccinated her two days earlier tested positive.

On 23 March, the government decided on a financial aid package totalling around 750 billion euros taking on new debt for the first time since 2013, to mitigate the damage of the coronavirus pandemic on the economy. As of late March, Deutsche Krankenhaus-Gesellschaft (DKG) reported an estimated number of 28,000 intensive care beds, of which 20,000 had respiratory support. 70 to 80 per cent were occupied by non-COVID-19 patients. A project to find out the exact percentage of free intensive care beds in Germany had been started by Deutsche Interdisziplinäre Vereinigung für Intensiv- und Notfallmedizin (DIVI) and half of all hospitals joined it.

On 25 March, the German Bundestag approved, with a large majority, the stimulus package which the government had decided on two days earlier. It also suspended the constitutionally enshrined debt brake to approve the supplementary government budget of 156 billion euros. The Kultusministerkonferenz decided against cancelling the Abitur school-leaving examinations, which were currently under way in Hessen and Rhineland-Palatinate. The Robert Koch Institute (RKI) warned that the epidemic had only just begun in Germany. The Bundestag made the determination of an epidemic situation of national significance (de:Epidemische Lage von nationaler Tragweite).

On 26 March, Robert Bosch GmbH announced it had developed a new COVID-19 test system, which could diagnose whether a patient was infected in less than 2.5 hours instead of days and could be run automatically at the point of care. According to Bosch, the test would be available in Germany in April and could check for 10 respiratory pathogens simultaneously with an accuracy of more than 95%. At night, it was reported the Interior Minister, Horst Seehofer, had decided to widen the scope of the entry restrictions, which had previously covered other EU- and non-EU citizens, to also prohibit asylum seekers from entering.

On 27 March, the stimulus package passed the German Bundesrat with large majority. It came into effect the same day with the signature of President Frank-Walter Steinmeier.

In late March, Adidas, Deichmann, H&M and many other retail companies which had their shops closed as part of the government restrictions announced that they planned to suspend rent payment according to the new law granting temporary relief during the corona crisis. Justice minister Christine Lambrecht called the step "indecent and unacceptable" and Bundestag member Florian Post (SPD) published a video of himself burning an Adidas shirt and calling for a boycott of the company.

==== 30 March – 5 April ====
On 31 March, Jena was the first major German city to announce an obligation to wear masks, or makeshift masks including scarves, in supermarkets, public transport, and buildings with public traffic. Minister president of Bavaria, Markus Söder, stated that the problem of mask acquisition needed to be solved before discussing an obligation to wear masks, and demanded a national emergency production of protective masks.

On 1 April, the project of a European Coronavirus app was publicised that, unlike apps of other countries, could satisfy the requirements of the EU's stringent data protection, releasable in Germany around 16 April. The project, titled Pan-European Privacy-Preserving Proximity Tracing (PEPP-PT), involved eight European countries and, on the German side, participation came from the Fraunhofer Institute for Telecommunications, Robert Koch Institute, Technische Universität Berlin, TU Dresden, University of Erfurt, Vodafone Germany and (for testing) Bundeswehr. The app would use Bluetooth to register close contact to other people with the app anonymously and warn the user when a person who had previously been in close contact officially registered an infection. Most German politicians demanded that public usage should be voluntary.

On 1 April, health minister Spahn forbade flights from Iran, effective immediately, on the basis of the new Infection Protection Act. Chancellor Merkel extended the social distancing measures to 19 April and asked people not to travel during the Easter holidays.

On 2 April, the Robert Koch Institute changed its previous recommendation that only people with symptoms should wear masks to also include people without symptoms. A general obligation to wear masks in public, not supported by the federal government and most regional governments, was discussed. It faced the counter-argument of general shortages of protection gear that could not even guarantee supply for the health care and maintenance system. At least 2,300 of German medical personnel in hospitals were confirmed to have contracted Sars-CoV-2. The number of cases from other medical sectors was not systematically collected and thus not known; most federal state governments and the Federal Health Ministry replied to a team of investigating journalists that no information could be given. In Bavaria, where 244 medical practices had been closed due to quarantine (141), lack of protection gear (82) and a lack of childcare (21), the Bavarian State Ministry for Health and Care instructed its health departments not to answer the request for information.

=== April 2020 ===
==== 6–12 April ====
On 7 April, the Robert Koch Institute, in partnership with healthtech startup Thryve, launched the app Corona-Datenspende (Corona Data Donation) for voluntary consensual use by the German public to help monitor the spread of COVID-19 and analyse the effectiveness of measures taken against the pandemic. The app was designed to be used with a range of smartwatches and fitness trackers to share anonymised health data for scientific purposes. Project leader Dirk Brockmann stated that he hoped that 100,000 people would sign up. Later that day, the RKI announced that more than 50,000 users had downloaded the app.

A preliminary result, published on 9 April, from a study by the University of Bonn, based on a sample from 1,000 residents of Gangelt in Heinsberg district, North Rhein-Westphalia (NRW) showed that two per cent of its population were infected, while 15 per cent of the residents have developed antibodies against the SARS-CoV-2 virus, regardless of whether they showed any symptoms. This constitutes a mortality rate of 0.37 per cent, significantly below the 0.9 per cent which Imperial College of the UK had estimated, or the 0.66 per cent found in a revised study last week. Several experts criticised that the Heinsberg study had been made public initially through a press conference – at which NRW Minister President Armin Laschet was also present – and expressed doubts about the method of statistical sampling used in the study, as well as other aspects.

==== 13–19 April ====
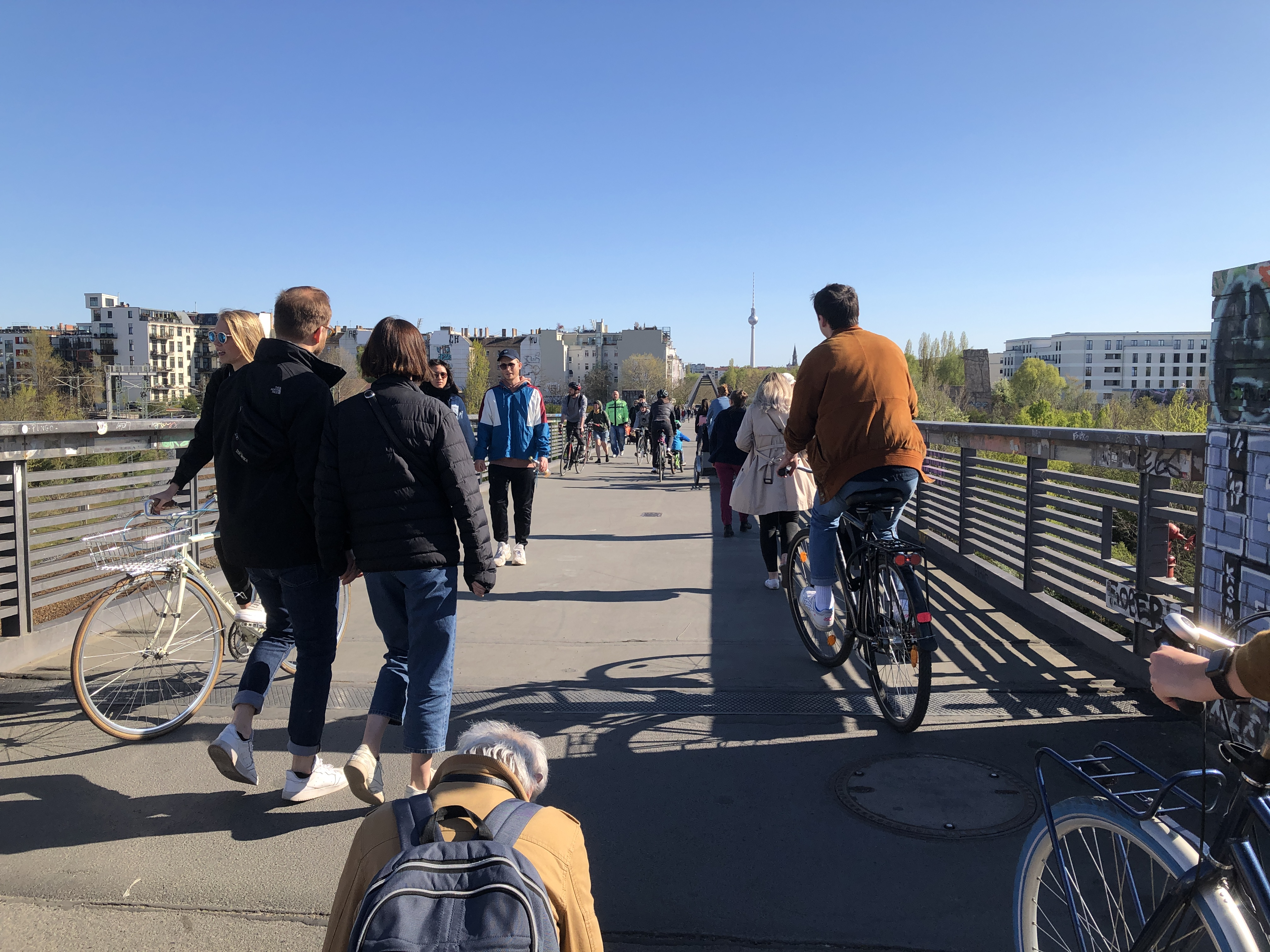
People on the Schwedter Steg bridge in the Berlin locality of Prenzlauer Berg on 19 April. While the 1.5-metre minimum distance is always possible to maintain on this bridge, on other, narrower bridges found throughout Germany it is not.

On 13 April, the German National Academy of Sciences, Leopoldina, published its third ad hoc statement on the COVID-19 pandemic in Germany. The statement, which supplements its two predecessors, described strategies for a stepwise lifting or modification of measures against the pandemic, taking into account psychological, social, legal, pedagogic and economic aspects. Re-opening of classroom primary and lower-level secondary education as soon as feasible, with observation of hygiene and physical distancing measures, was recommended. The statement did not contain a timeframe for implementing its recommendations.

On 15 April, after a video conference with the Minister presidents of the 16 Federal states, chancellor Merkel stated that Germany had achieved "fragile intermediate success" in slowing the spread of the virus, but restrictions of public life remained key to preventing the spread of the virus from accelerating again. Shops with a retail space of up to 800 square metres, as well as bookshops, bike shops and car dealerships, would be allowed to reopen to the public on 20 April, providing they followed specified conditions of distancing and hygiene. Schools would start opening on 4 May, as well as hair salons, the latter under particularly strict conditions. It was agreed that large cultural events would not be allowed before 31 August. Other restrictions on social life, which had been imposed on 22 March – including the ban on gatherings of more than two people – were extended until at least 3 May. Merkel urgently recommended people to wear protective masks on public transport and while shopping, but stopped short of making them mandatory.

On 16 April, Bavarian State Premier Markus Söder stated that Oktoberfest would most likely be cancelled. While the government and state governors started to reach agreement to relax some aspects of the social distancing protocols, large events would be banned until at least 31 August.

==== 20–26 April ====
On 20 April, as shops started to reopen – with differences from state to state in the level of restrictions –, chancellor Merkel thanked Germans for adhering, on the whole, to advice on staying at home and to physical distancing rules. At the same time, she warned that the country continued to be "at the start of this pandemic". If infections were to resurge, which would be visible after two weeks, another shutdown would follow, an outcome which had to be prevented for the sake of the economy.

On 21 April, Bavarian State Premier Söder announced that Oktoberfest would be cancelled.

==== 27 April – 3 May ====
After a summit between Angela Merkel and state leaders on 30 April, the federal government allowed opening of museums, monuments, botanical gardens and zoos, and religious services under strict social distancing conditions.

=== May 2020 ===
==== 4–10 May ====
On 4 May, the district of Coesfeld in North Rhine-Westphalia recorded 581 infections, an increase by 53 cases from two days earlier. It was reported that a large part of this increase had come from a proactive case tracing and testing of employees at a meat factory in Coesfeld city by the district health office. The plant was allowed to continue to operate under tight supervision by the office.

On a conference call between chancellor Merkel and 16 state premiers on 6 May, Merkel stated that the goal of slowing down the virus had been achieved and that the first phase of the pandemic was over, while asking everyone to remain cautious so as not to cause a second wave. At the same time, the federal government announced the lifting of more restrictions, while contact limitations would remain until 5 June. Under the newly agreed conditions, a maximum of two different households can meet in public. All shops are allowed to open, schools and kindergartens may open in phases, people in care homes are allowed visits from one permanent contact person, outdoor sports without physical contact can resume, and Bundesliga matches may resume starting 15 May, behind closed doors (the latter practice being known in Germany as de:Geisterspiele). The decision on specific opening dates, including those for the restaurant sector, has been left to individual states. Local governments were authorised to reimpose restrictions immediately in case of a new wave of cases reaching 50 per 100,000 people within 7 days in a locality.

On 7 May, a test of 200 employees at the Coesfeld meat processing plant, where cases had first been reported on 4 May, revealed 151 were positive for COVID-19. North Rhine-Westphalia state health minister Karl-Josef Laumann stated that the shared accommodation of workers in tight quarters was a possible reason for the outbreak. He also stated that the number of new infections in Coesfeld district had been 61 per 100,000 people over the previous week. The plant was closed until further notice, while schools and day care facilities in the district were allowed to open as planned on 11 May. On 9 May, the RKI gave the number of infections in the Coesfeld district in the past week as 76 cases per 100,000, while all other districts in the state remained well below 50 cases per 100,000.

By the afternoon of 10 May, five locations in Germany reported an exceedance of the threshold: besides Coesfeld, these were the city of Rosenheim in Bavaria (the latter having had a first exceedance on 7 May); the districts Greiz and Sonneberg in Thuringia; and the district Steinburg in Schleswig-Holstein.

==== 11–17 May ====
On 12 May, the Senate of Berlin agreed to a traffic light-type warning system for a re-tightening of coronavirus restrictions. Besides the number of new infections per 100,000 residents in the preceding seven days, which had been agreed upon earlier by the federal government with the German states, it also considers the development of the reproduction number R and the capacity of intensive-care hospital beds.

On 13 May, Interior Minister Horst Seehofer announced that border controls with several neighbouring countries would be eased starting 15 May. On that day, controls at the border with Luxembourg would be scrapped, and the goal would be to have free travel to Austria, France, and Switzerland starting 15 June.

On 14 May, the German government tabled a law aimed in particular at improving the protection of risk groups and enabling a better understanding of the progress of the pandemic. It came into effect the following day. Regular contacts of persons at risk, such as in nursing homes, are to be subject to more thorough coronavirus testing, to recognise outbreaks early and to break transmission chains. Laboratories are now required to report negative test results, and to provide the probable place of infection if available; data will be reported to RKI in anonymised form. Carers in facilities for the aged, including volunteers and trainees, will be entitled to a one-off tax-free payment of up to 1,500 euros. The costs of intensive care treatment of COVID-19 patients from other European countries will be borne by Germany if the patients are unable to be treated in their home countries due to lack of capacity.

On 15 May, it was reported that Labour Minister Hubertus Heil was to present a government proposal on 18 May to Germany's "corona cabinet", aimed at improving hygiene standards in meat processing plants through measures including prohibition of subcontractors. During the days prior, several German states had reported outbreaks in meat plants.

==== 18–24 May ====
On 20 May, in response to the recent outbreaks of COVID-19 at several meat processing plants, the German government agreed on a new framework of regulations for the industry, including an effective ban on subcontracting at meat packing plants, as well as tighter supervision of any living quarters provided by the employers. The draft was to be put into a law which still required parliamentary approval.

New outbreaks at initial reception facilities (called Ankerzentren in several German states) and other housing for refugees continued to be reported in several parts of Germany. On 21 May 137 out of 580 residents at an Ankerzentrum in Geldersheim, Bavaria, were reported to have been infected. Several dozen residents had angrily demanded on 18 May that the quarantine, which by then had been in place for over seven weeks, be lifted. A spokesperson of the local government of Lower Franconia expressed his understanding for the protests.

On 23 May, local authorities in Frankfurt told a news agency that more than 40 people had tested positive for the coronavirus after attending a church service on 10 May. It was reported that the church had adhered to official social distancing and hygiene rules.

On the weekend of 23/24 May, it became known that Thuringia State Premier Bodo Ramelow intended to lift all general coronavirus related restrictions after 5 June, the expiry date of the then current set of restrictions. The announcement met with a heated debate and severe criticism from health experts including epidemiologist Karl Lauterbach, as well as the media.

==== 25–31 May ====
The plans of Thuringia State Premier Ramelow continued to be the subject of intense debate. A survey by public broadcaster ZDF found that of those polled throughout Germany, 72 per cent were against Ramelow's plans. 56 per cent of respondents deemed the restrictions currently in place as neither too tight nor too relaxed.

=== June 2020 ===
On 3 June, the German federal cabinet agreed to allow travels to all 26 EU countries, the United Kingdom, Iceland, Norway, Switzerland and Liechtenstein starting 15 June, subject to the pandemic being sufficiently under control in the destination country. Travel warnings would still be maintained with regard to countries where large-scale curfews or entry restrictions remain in place. Foreign Minister Heiko Maas stated that he anticipated Spain to open its borders to travellers on 21 June, rather than the currently set date of 1 July. Norway stated that it would consider to allow entry from certain neighbouring countries, which would include Germany.

On 9 June, the state cabinet of Thuringia agreed to lift most contact restrictions starting 13 June. In the new Grundverordnung (basic regulation), citizens are encouraged to strive to keep physical social contact with others at a low level, and to keep the group of people who they have such contact with steady. The minimum physical distance requirement of 1.5 metres is dropped for groups from at most two households. The use of face masks in public transport and in shops continues to be required. Folk festival and sports event organisers may apply for an exemption from the general prohibition of such events.

In mid June 2020, the German government launched a COVID-19 tracing app. On 23 October, the Corona-Warn-App was reported to have 16 million active users. From 19 October, it exchanged warnings with apps from Ireland and Italy, and other European countries were expected to follow. The app is anonymous and while its use is voluntary, the government later included it in its official recommendations.

On 17 June, German authorities announced that a total of 657 people had tested positive at a slaughterhouse run by meat processing firm Tönnies in the city of Gütersloh, out of 983 completed tests. Schools in the districts were closed until the start of the summer holidays on 29 June. Tönnies apologised for the outbreak. Virologist Isabella Eckerle said that a superspreading event was the likely cause. That conclusion was confirmed by a research report released in July by authors from authored by researchers from the Helmholtz Centre for Infection Research, the Medical Centre Hamburg-Eppendorf, and the Heinrich Pette Institute.

On 23 June, against the backdrop of a rise in confirmed cases in the Tönnies cluster to above 1,500, the neighbouring districts of Gütersloh and Warendorf were subject to the same contact restrictions as in March, until 30 June. Schools in Gütersloh would also close until the summer break. Extensive testing of the local population would be carried out to establish the extent of the outbreak; to that date, merely 24 positive tests had been returned from those who did not work at Tönnies. In response to the development, Bavaria issued a temporary ban for hotels to accommodate guests coming from any district which exceeded the threshold of 50 infections per 100,000 residents in the past seven days, unless travellers could produce an up-to-date negative coronavirus test. On 29 June, the lockdown of Warendorf district was announced to end on the night of 30 June, while it would be extended in Gütersloh district by another week.

On 21 September, a report from the Detmold regional government from mid May surfaced, which stated that violations of hygiene rules had been found by inspectors already before the outbreak, with no workers in the slaughter areas having worn masks at an inspection on 15 May, and canteens and toilets not being up to standards. The report also criticised that the next inspection had only been carried out two weeks after.

=== July 2020 ===
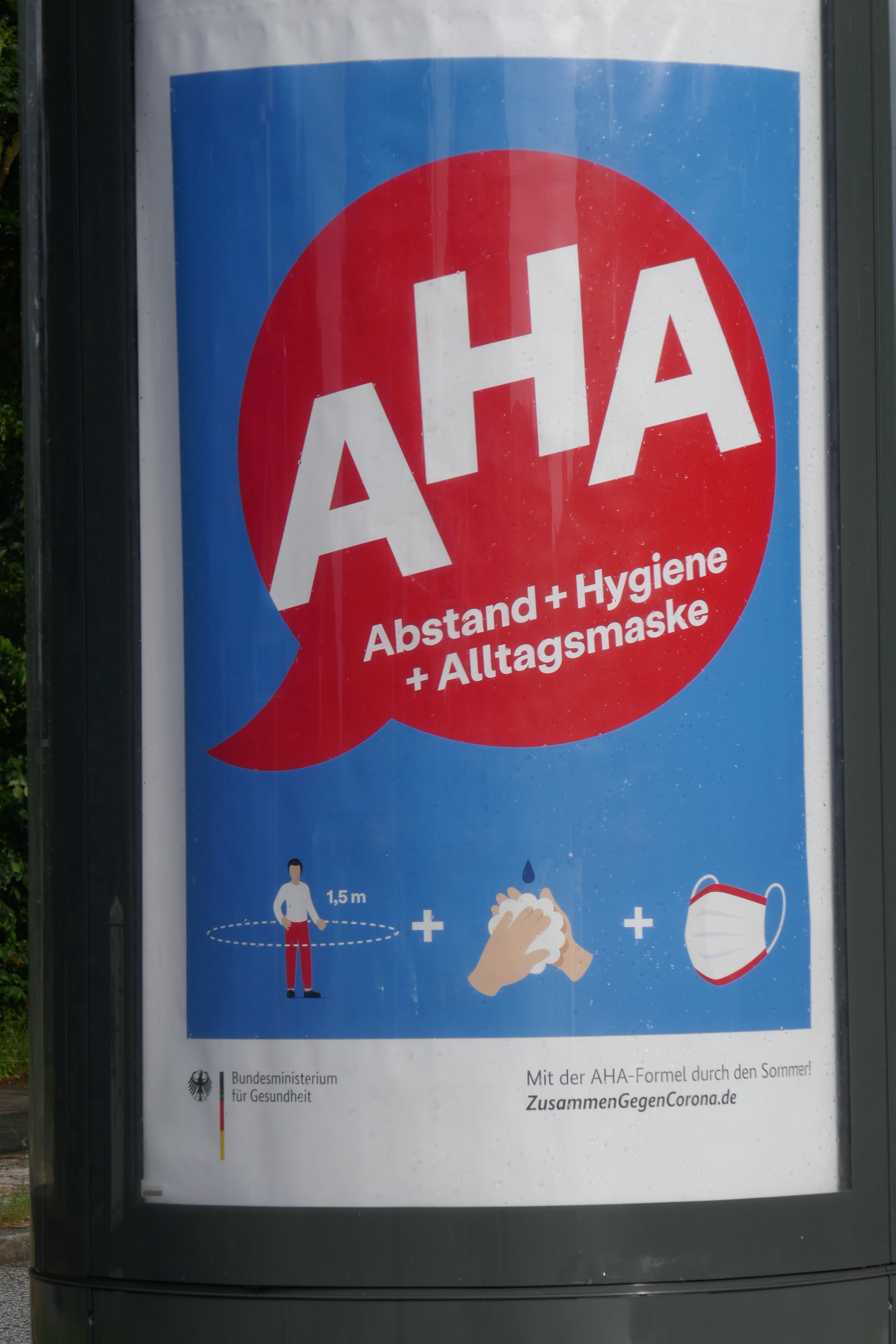
German Ministry of Health poster with recommendations in Lübeck. The acronym "AHA" translates into English as "DHM" for the initial letters of the three measures: distance, hygiene, masks.

On midnight from 1 to 2 July, in the course of implementing a recommendation of the Council of the European Union from 30 June on phasing out temporary entry restrictions, Germany allowed unrestricted entry from eleven countries outside the European Union. Extended entry possibilities from all such countries were created, with the list of "important reasons" including: healthcare workers, health researchers and geriatric care workers; skilled and highly qualified foreign workers if their employment is necessary from an economic perspective and requires presence in Germany; and foreign students whose course of study is not fully possible from abroad.

On 6 July, the supreme administrative court of North Rhine–Westphalia (Oberverwaltungsgericht für das Land Nordrhein-Westfalen) suspended the extension until 7 July of the lockdown in Gütersloh district. In its ruling, the court stated that more differentiated lockdown measures depending on the location within the district would have been appropriate and possible, given the extensive testing in the district that had taken place after the outbreak at Tönnies.

=== August 2020 ===
According to a new regulation issued by health minister Spahn that came in force on 8 August, travellers returning to Germany from designated high-risk countries were required to undergo a coronavirus test within three days of arrival, unless they are able to produce a recent negative test result when entering Germany.

On 27 August, as numbers of daily infections rose to levels of April, Merkel and the state leaders agreed on a raft of measures, including a minimum fine of €50 for not wearing a mask in shops or on public transport (not implemented in Saxony-Anhalt as premier Reiner Haseloff pointed to low infection figures in the state). Additionally, free coronavirus tests for travellers returning to Germany from non-risk areas would be ended, while an aim was formulated that travellers returning from high-risk areas would be quarantined. No restrictions were placed on the number of people meeting at private gatherings; however, Merkel and the state leaders appealed to the public to "critically weigh" the risks associated with such events.

=== September 2020 ===
On 29 September, chancellor Merkel explained that the government's guidelines to tackle the virus, encapsulated in the acronym AHA, which stands for distancing, hygiene and masks, will be extended to become AHACL. The "C" stands for the coronavirus warning app introduced in June, and "L" for Lüften or airing a room. "Regular impact ventilation in all private and public rooms can considerably reduce the danger of infection," the government's recommendation explained.

=== October 2020 ===
Early in the month, there was a sharp upturn in daily reported cases. On 8 October, 4,096 new cases were reported by the Robert Koch Institute, compared to 2,828 the day before. RKI President Lothar Wieler warned of the possibility of the number of daily cases exceeding 10,000 in the coming weeks, or of an uncontrolled spread occurring, but expressed his hopes that this could be averted. He said that experts saw larger outbreaks as well as numerous smaller ones throughout the country as contributing to the surge of cases. Health minister Spahn urged Germans to assiduously follow the AHACL formula. He said that many of the recent cases were due to youths who were socially active without giving sufficient regard to the higher risks that the virus posed to the aged.

On 17 October, chancellor Merkel used her weekly podcast to urge German residents to "refrain from any trip that is not really necessary, any celebration that is not really necessary", and to stay at home "whenever possible". Head of the Chancellery Helge Braun spoke of an "enormous" need for contact tracers. As of 31 October, the Bundeswehr had 3,200 soldiers participate in pandemic containment measures, principally in contact tracing, with plans to add a further 720 soldiers.

On 28 October, as the number of new reported infections continued to rise and the established system of tracing of contacts of confirmed positive cases was no longer possible to maintain in Berlin, Chancellor Merkel and the leaders of the 16 German states convened for an emergency video conference, after which they announced a partial lockdown, promoted by the government as "wave break", effective from 2–30 November. During the lockdown period, a maximum of ten people from at most two households would be allowed to meet; religious congregations and street protests would be subject to exemptions. Schools and kindergartens would remain open. Restaurants and cafes would only be able to sell takeaway food. Small firms would be able to access direct compensation based on their November 2019 revenue.

=== November 2020 ===
On 1 November, Spahn called for the public to prepare for "months of restrictions and abstinence". At a press conference on 2 November, Merkel also spoke of the need to "limit private contacts", saying that the measures were intended to create conditions for a "tolerable December".

Ahead of a meeting of chancellor Merkel with the state ministers-presidents on 16 November, a draft proposal by the federal government surfaced which called for a universal mask requirement in schools including during breaks, as well as other measures. After strong resistance of the state chiefs, Merkel conceded to their demand to postpone any decision until a further meeting to be held the following week.

On 25 November, as it emerged that the lockdown had to date served to stabilise daily infection numbers but not reduced them, chancellor Merkel and the leaders of the federal states agreed to an extension of the partial lockdown until at least 20 December. From 1 December, social gathering restrictions were to be tightened to allow only private gatherings of at most five people from at most two different households, down from a previous limit of ten people, not counting children up to 14 years of age. This limit was to be temporarily raised again to ten people for the period from 21 December 2020 until 1 January 2021, covering Christmas. Individual states are authorised to further tighten these restrictions in districts with more than 200 diagnosed infections per 100,000 residents in the past seven days. To reduce the transmission risk at Christmas gatherings, the start of school holidays was planned for 19 December. Retail outlets with more than 800 square metres of sales area were to be required to leave 20 square metres of space for each customer, up from the previous requirement of 10.

On 27 November, the total number of reported infections since the start of the pandemic reached one million.

=== December 2020 ===
On 2 December, the countrywide lockdown was extended until 10 January. Berlin's governing mayor Michael Müller announced that the city would not relax the gathering rules. On 6 December, Bavarian premier Markus Söder announced that his state would likewise adopt stricter measures, including a nightly curfew from 9:00 p.m. until 5:00 a.m. in hotspots. Saxony, which had become the most afflicted German state, announced on 8 December that as its hospitals were "extremely burdened", it would impose a hard lockdown in which the Christmas break at schools, daycare centres and select shops would start early on 14 December. This and other recommendations were contained in a report by the German national science academy Leopoldina issued the same day.

The RKI raised its assessment of the level of danger to the health of the general population to "very high" on 11 December.

On 13 December, chancellor Merkel and the state premiers agreed to a hard lockdown to be imposed from 16 December. Under the new regulations, schools will be closed. During the Christmas period from 24 to 26 December, social gathering rules will be relaxed to allowing one household to invite a maximum of four close family members from other households. New Year events would be banned, as would be drinking of alcohol in public places for the whole lockdown period. The latter measure ended the operations of pop-up Glühwein (mulled wine) shops, which had previously acted as a substitute for the cancelled Christmas markets in Cologne but had also drawn sharp criticism for undermining social distancing restrictions.

=== January 2021 ===
At a videoconference of chancellor Merkel with the 16 state premiers on 5 January, the lockdown was extended by three weeks until 31 January. The high number of daily infections – far above the levels allowing contact tracing – and a worryingly large number of coronavirus-related deaths were given as reasons; additionally, the uncertainties surrounding the more infectious variant of the virus originating in the United Kingdom, of which the first case had been detected in Germany on 24 December. The government also announced a toughening of physical distancing requirements, with people only being able to meet with one other person outside their own household. In districts with more than 200 infections per 100,000 inhabitants over the past seven days, people would be restricted to travel a maximum of 15 kilometres from their place of residence, unless they had a good reason for travelling further. One rationale for the latter measure had been reports of day trippers thronging popular winter destinations.

In an interview on 12 January with Deutschlandfunk, epidemiologist Krause urged for a massive step-up of the protection of residents of nursing homes and geriatric clinics to prevent a large number of deaths.

On 19 January, Merkel and the 16 state governors agreed to extend the lockdown until 14 February, and toughened it by a new requirement to wear filter masks such as FFP2 respirators. Employers are required, wherever possible, to allow employees to work from home – popularly known in Germany as the pseudo-anglicism "Homeoffice" – until 15 March.

Amidst concerns about coronavirus variants spreading in Germany, authorities on 29 January released a regulation under which – with exceptions including for those having the right to reside in Germany, as well as for those travelling in relation to urgent medical transports or for humanitarian reasons – an entry ban was imposed for travellers from "countries designated as regions with variants". The countries included were the United Kingdom, Ireland, Brazil, Portugal and South Africa, starting from 30 January, with Lesotho and Eswatini to follow on 31 January. The restrictions were set to run until 17 February.

=== February 2021 ===
The RKI reported on 4 February that the seven-day incidence had dropped to 48 in the city of Munich. Mayor Dieter Reiter nevertheless stated that only if the value could be kept below the threshold of 50 over the coming week would there be grounds to discuss relaxation of the lockdown restrictions for the city.

On 10 February, Merkel and the heads of the German states agreed on extending the lockdown until 7 March, with hairdressers to be allowed to reopen on 1 March under strict conditions. Schools and daycare centres were agreed to be "the first to gradually reopen", with the decision on the timing and the modalities left to individual states. In view of the mutations of the virus, it was agreed that the relaxation of the restrictions would be discussed only after the seven-day incidence had dropped to below 35, rather than the threshold of 50 which had been in place since May 2020.

On 12 February, health minister Spahn announced that Germany would unilaterally close its borders to neighbouring countries Czechia and Austrian province Tyrol, citing concerns about coronavirus variants. Exceptions were made for truck drivers and other essential professions, subject to a negative coronavirus test taken at most 48 hours prior to crossing the border. The European Commission wrote an official complaint letter to Germany – along with Hungary, Denmark, Sweden, and Finland –, calling for less restrictive measures. On 23 February, Minister of State Michael Roth rejected the criticism, saying that the measure did align with the Schengen Agreement.

On 26 February, Spahn confirmed that the seven-day incidence among those 80 years and over had dropped from 200 in early February to 70. He said that this was probably due to the vaccination campaign, which prioritised this age group. The RKI said that the number of active outbreaks, new outbreaks and number of affected residents had declined, and that this was "very probably" due to vaccination.

=== March 2021 ===
From 15 March until 18 March, Germany temporarily suspended the use of the AstraZeneca vaccine "as a precaution" according to the Health Ministry, and on 30 March restricted its use in patients under the age of 60 years.

On 24 March, the partial lockdown was extended until at least 18 April 2021. In a step that was considered highly unusual, Merkel withdrew her plan of a five-day period of shop closure beginning 1 April and no physical church services.

=== April 2021 ===
A national mourning day for the nearly 80,000 fatalities of the coronavirus in Germany was held on 18 April. President Steinmeier and chancellor Merkel attended a memorial service at Kaiser Wilhelm Memorial Church in the morning.

A change in the Infection Protection Act was signed into law on 22 April. Taking effect on 24 April and valid until 30 June, it curtailed the powers of individual states in the case of high incidence rates via a so-called "emergency brake". Plans for the amendment had first been announced on 9 April. The German physicians' union Marburger Bund had pressed for speedy passing of the amendment. The emergency brake mandated that if the seven-day incidence remains above 100 over three consecutive days, then local authorities must restrict personal contacts to one household and at most one other person, with exceptions; impose a curfew from 10:00 p.m. until 5:00 a.m. the following day, with exceptions for walking or jogging alone until midnight; and mandate non-essential shops to require their customers to have a negative test result, and operate on appointment basis only. If the incidence is above 150, only pre-ordered goods would be allowed to be picked up. If the incidence is above 165, close in-person teaching at school will be suspended, with exceptions possible. The discussion of the law on 21 April was accompanied by protests in Berlin, in which several thousand participated.

=== May 2021 ===
On 6 May, the German parliament decided to lift most pandemic restrictions for the fully vaccinated and previously infected, who numbered about 10 million at the time. The relaxations included the provision that members of those two groups would be treated as if having a negative COVID-19 test result for the purpose of visiting shops. The changes were expected to take effect on 8 May. The decision, which effectively introduced a two-tier system, met with criticism by some of those who still had to wait for their vaccination shot under the regulations, such as teenagers.

On 17 May, health minister Spahn announced that from 7 June, the COVID-19 vaccination prioritisation would be dropped, making everyone of age 16 and above eligible to receive a vaccine. Meanwhile, requests for vaccinations had already overrun practices. Ulrich Weigeldt, chair of the German Association of General Practitioners, asked the public to be patient.

=== June 2021 ===
The RKI lowered its assessment of the level of danger to the health of the general population from "very high" to "high" on 1 June.

=== July 2021 ===
On 5 July, in response to the spread of the more transmissible Delta variant, the Robert Koch Institute revised upwards the recommended level of vaccination necessary to prevent a fourth wave of the pandemic in autumn, to 85 per cent of those in the age range 12–59.

At a press conference on 21 July, as the daily infection numbers had begun to increase again over the past two weeks, health minister Spahn spoke about the incidence rate. He hinted that the threshold for the 7-day incidence could be increased from 50 to 200, as the proportion of serious COVID-19 cases, and thus the burden on the public health system, was expected to be lower due to the progress of the vaccination campaign. He urged citizens to continue adhering to anti-pandemic measures and to get vaccinated, to forestall the risk of the pandemic situation getting out of control in the months from September.

=== August 2021 ===
On 1 August, new rules came in force that required all unvaccinated travelers coming to Germany to present a negative test result prior to entering the country, with exceptions including transit passengers and cross-border commuters. Previously, the testing requirement had only applied to those arriving by plane. The new rules came amid concerns about the Delta variant and the possibility of infection spikes being the result of returning tourists.

=== September 2021 ===
On 13 September, in order to increase the vaccination rate which stood at close to 62 per cent fully vaccinated as of that date and had been stagnating for several weeks, the German government launched a week-long vaccination campaign. A paper published by the Heinrich Böll Foundation in December 2021 considered the effort, along with incentives such as offering free food or leisure activities in exchange for a vaccination, as having failed.

=== October 2021 ===
With effect from 1 October, the states of North Rhine-Westphalia, Bavaria and Saarland lifted most of their remaining pandemic restrictions. In North Rhine-Westphalia, the mask requirement in public outdoor spaces was changed to a formal recommendation, and football matches and concerts could now accommodate spectators according to full seating capacity, rather than half as had been the case before. Bavaria allowed the reopening of discos, clubs and brothels under the "3G" rule, with no mask requirement. There would also be no longer a mask requirement in schools. Saarland loosened its restriction subject to a change after 14 days. A government official said that the state wanted to set "a signal for more personal responsibility". Epidemiologist Karl Lauterbach warned of another wave of the pandemic in the colder season.

On 27 October, all parties in the traffic light coalition that from 8 December formed the new government said that they did not support the extension of the pandemic-related state of emergency that was set to expire on 25 November. They voiced their intention to instead amend the Infection Protection Act in order to allow states to adjust mask wearing and contact tracing requirements to their needs.

=== November 2021 ===
On 4 November, as almost 34,000 reported infections set a new record since the beginning of the pandemic, health minister Spahn spoke of a "massive pandemic of the unvaccinated". This and similar statements by other government officials in Germany and the United States were soon criticized by scientists for underrating the role of the vaccinated in the pandemic.

On 8 November, draft legislation of anti-pandemic measures by the prospective future government parties – the SPD, the Alliance 90/The Greens and the FDP – became public. The legislation, proposed to remain in force until 19 March 2022, contained a range of measures including a 3G rule for public indoor premises, but no provisions for suspension of face-to-face teaching in schools or other lockdown measures.

On 11 November, chancellor-in-waiting Olaf Scholz reiterated his intention for the epidemic situation of national significance (de:Epidemische Lage von nationaler Tragweite) to end on 25 November as scheduled. He called on the parliament to support a catalogue of new measures to replace the state of emergency. His incoming government argued that pandemic restrictions should again be debated and decided in parliament.

On 18 November, a far-reaching package of anti-pandemic measures oriented at the hospitalization rate, the new main indicator, was passed in the Bundestag as the end of the pandemic state of emergency on 25 November was confirmed. The same day, vaccination commission STIKO recommended booster shots for all adults, to be given with an mRNA vaccine and to be given six, or in case of capacity allowing five, months after the last vaccine dose.

On 19 November, Spahn said that the country was facing a "national emergency" and that a lockdown could not be ruled out. RKI president Wieler said that many hospitals were at breaking point and urged for the "vaccination gaps" to be closed. According to health officials, the COVID surge in Saxony could be attributed to the low vaccination rate, which stood at less than 58 per cent. The state and Bavaria were cancelling all Christmas markets. The health commission STIKO recommended booster shots to all adults after six months, with a reduction to five being possible subject to capacity.

From 26 November, the German Air Force started transporting COVID-19 patients requiring intensive care to less stretched hospitals. The first MedEvac flight was flying that day from Bavaria to North Rhine-Westphalia. Speaking to reporters, Spahn and RKI President Wieler warned of the entry of the Omicron variant, with Spahn welcoming a decision by the European Union to halt all air travel from South Africa and several surrounding countries.

=== December 2021 ===
Newly appointed health minister Lauterbach said that the first specific goal of the new government would be a reduction of case numbers to the degree where the government could recommend travel without putting people's health at risk.

On 9 December, the STIKO vaccination commission issued a recommendation for children aged between 5 and 11 years with pre-existing conditions, or those with close contact to vulnerable people, to be vaccinated against COVID-19. It also approved other children in that age group to receive vaccination if there was an "individual desire" to do so. Vaccination commenced by 16 December.

At a press conference on 16 December, health minister Lauterbach said that the country was racing to secure more COVID-19 vaccines, including a modification of the Pfizer–BioNTech COVID-19 vaccine geared towards the rapidly rising Omicron variant; booster shots were a central part of the government strategy to fight the variant.

On 17 December, the Bundesrat passed a decision to forbid the sale of fireworks, to forestall an additional burden on hospitals due to injuries.

=== January 2022 ===
In an interview excerpt published 8 January, health minister Lauterbach warned against leaving the Omicron variant unchecked, saying that "many people would become seriously ill with often permanent damage" and that an Omicron infection would "not necessarily make one immune to the next viral variant". Earlier the same week, he had tweeted that not curbing Omicron would be an "absolutely irresponsible experiment" for children.

At their regular conference on 10 January, the state health ministers announced that vaccination centres would remain in operation until the end of 2022.

On 11 January, at a meeting of the state chiefs with the government, a set of new anti-pandemic measures was agreed. In view of an anticipated major surge in cases due to the Omicron variant and resulting pressure on basic services, quarantine periods would be scrapped for those who were boostered, recently vaccinated twice, vaccinated and recovered, or recently recovered. For all others, isolation or quarantine would normally end after ten days if COVID-19 symptoms had ceased, or after seven days with a PCR or certified rapid test. School students who are contacts of infected persons, and medical and healthcare workers who are cases or contacts would likewise be able to shorten quarantine or isolation to respectively five and seven days with a PCR test. Access to restaurants would be tightened according to the 2G+ rule. The new rules were to take effect on 15 January.

On 21 January, Reuters reported that at a virtual meeting with state leaders, health minister Lauterbach had warned that daily case numbers could reach 400,000 by mid-February under an optimistic scenario where booster vaccinations were assumed to provide very good protection, and more than 600,000 if they were less protective.

In response to a shortage of available testing capacities, the federal government and the state health ministers agreed on 24 January to prioritize PCR tests to particularly vulnerable groups, and caregivers at hospitals and other facilities. The prioritization was criticized by the German Foundation for Patient Rights for not including family members acting as primary caregivers, and by the national teachers' association for insufficient attention to secondary school students and teachers.

=== February 2022 ===
On 3 February, vaccination commission STIKO recommended the use of the Novavax COVID-19 vaccine and a second booster shot, typically a fourth dose, of a COVID-19 vaccine for particularly at-risk groups.

On 16 February, chancellor Scholz assessed the pandemic wave as having apparently passed its peak, but warned that the pandemic was not yet over. He announced an easing of restrictions in three phases. According to the draft legislation, all major restrictions were to end on 20 March; physical distancing and mask wearing requirements would be continued beyond that date, however.

=== March 2022 ===
In what health minister Lauterbach called a "difficult compromise", the Bundestag agreed on 18 March on a revision of the Infection Protection Act that contained the lifting of most pandemic restrictions. Mask-wearing remained obligatory on public transport, hospitals and care homes. Individual states would be able to impose tougher rules in so-called 'hotspots' where both infections and hospitalizations peak. The previous rules expired on 19 March and without the revision, no more measures would have been possible after that date. Several states were to make use of a clause that allowed maintaining the previous restrictions until early April in view of the high and increasing infection numbers, and five called for an additional four weeks of restrictions beyond 2 April.

=== April 2022 ===
In the early morning of 6 April, health minister Lauterbach wrote on Twitter that the decision to make five-day isolation for those testing positive for the coronavirus non-obligatory from 1 May would be reversed as it would send a "wrong and damaging" signal. He had made statements to the same effect during a talkshow in the late hours of 5 April. Opposition leader Friedrich Merz criticized the U-turn sharply, while other politicians lauded the step.

=== June 2022 ===
In an assessment published on 8 June, the government advisory panel warned of an increase in COVID-19 cases, as well as of other respiratory infections, in autumn and winter. It projected three scenarios for the development of the pandemic; in the baseline scenario, reintroduction of large-scale measures such as mask wearing indoors would be deemed necessary to reduce economic losses due to sick leave. Recommendations included a call for comprehensive preparation on the federal and state levels for a new wave of the pandemic, and for a solid legal foundation allowing pandemic measures to be implemented quickly. Health minister Lauterbach said that the Infection Protection Act would need to be extended, in modified form. He said that at present the middle scenario was the most likely, citing the current increase in the BA.5 subvariant of the Omicron variant.

In late June 2022, several weeks after the outline of coronavirus measures for autumn planned by health minister Lauterbach had been made public, he presented a plan for the regular conference with state ministers which had seven key points: a vaccination campaign tailored to the pandemic situation from September, based on the Moderna and BioNTech vaccines; maintenance of an easily accessible infrastructure for rapid and PCR tests; optimization of treatment of COVID-19 patients; adequate protection of residents of care facilities; mandatory daily reporting by hospitals of the number of infected, as well as the load of their intensive and non-intensive care facilities; adequate protection of children and youth, with closure of day care facilities and schools being however ruled out; and a revision of the Infection Protection Act.

=== July 2022 ===
Health minister Lauterbach said in an interview on 15 July that everyone should talk about a second booster (fourth vaccination) with their doctor. In doing so, Lauterbach went beyond both the recommendation of vaccination commission STIKO (which only recommended a second booster for those aged 70 and above, and to risk groups) and of the European Medicines Agency (which had put that threshold at 60 years of age). STIKO head Thomas Mertens criticized Lauterbach, saying that he was unaware of any data supporting the general second booster, and that it was logistically impossible to vaccinate the whole population every year.

=== August 2022 ===
On 3 August, the German government presented its plans for anti-pandemic measures to be valid from October to early April 2023. Under the new rules, mask-wearing was to be made mandatory on planes and during long-distance travel, in hospitals, nursing homes, and other institutions with vulnerable people. Individual states were to be allowed to require masks also in local public transport and in schools for students from grade five, depending on the pandemic situation.

On 18 August, the vaccination commission STIKO issued a new recommendation for the general population of age 60 years and over to receive a second booster shot. At the same time, it lowered the age limit for the Novavax COVID-19 vaccine from 18 to 12 years. Health minister Lauterbach welcomed the decision, saying it had been "overdue". The STIKO also increased the recommended time interval between the primary series and the booster vaccination to at least 6 months (from previously 3 months).

On 28 August 2022, the Federal Minister of Justice Marco Buschmann proclaimed that his party (FDP) would not agree to the reintroduction of the legal instrument of the "epidemic situation of national relevance", for such a step "müsste sich schon regelrecht die Hölle unter uns auftun" ("would have to open downright hell among us").

=== September 2022 ===
On 16 September 2022, the German government made its plans for corona measures definitive for between 1 October 2022 and 7 April 2023. Any person aged 14 or above was required to wear an FFP2 mask on long-distance public transport, in hospitals and other health care facilities. Any person aged of 6 to 13 was required to wear a medical mask or an FFP2 mask on long-distance public transport, in hospitals and other health care facilities. Any person below the age of 6 was not required to wear a mask. To be able to visit a hospital or a nursing home people were required to show proof of a negative corona test.

In addition, the states of Germany were allowed impose extra corona measures at their discretion. The corona measures they were allowed to impose contained the following: the option to impose the mandate of wearing a FFP2 mask or a medical mask in public buildings, all public transport and on schools starting from fifth grade, and the option to impose a mandate for showing proof of a corona test when entering a restaurant, cafe, cinema, theater, museum or other cultural facility, doing specific sports or entering schools. Proof of a negative corona test removed the mandate to wear a mask in that specific place.

=== October 2022 ===
On 14 October, during the eighth wave of the pandemic in Germany, health minister Lauterbach called on states to tighten existing anti-pandemic rules, saying that the country was heading down "the wrong path", but that it was "not too late to act".

=== November 2022 ===
On 11 November, four German states – Baden-Württemberg, Bavaria, Hesse, and Schleswig-Holstein – announced their intention to waive the quarantine requirement on those testing positive for the coronavirus. Bavaria implemented the waiver as the first state on 18 November, requiring instead those who were testing positive to wear at least a surgical mask when leaving home if the minimum physical distance requirement of 1.5 metres to others could not be kept; exceptions were allowed for children under the age of six, holders of medical certificates, and some other groups. Access to care facilities would remain prohibited to the infected, again with exceptions. Health minister Lauterbach had expressed his strong disapproval of the plans as soon as they became public. Eugen Brysch, president of the German Foundation for Patient Rights, criticized the new regulations in Bavaria as "contradictory", and said that Bavaria was giving a "chaotic example" for other states who wanted to drop the isolation requirement. On the other hand, Klaus Reinhardt, president of the German Medical Association, said that the new regulations were justified, citing the decreasing case numbers, the predominantly mild course of the disease, and the example of other countries.

=== January 2023 ===
On 13 January, health minister Lauterbach announced that the government had decided to scrap the mask mandate on long-distance public transport with effect from 2 February. As reason for the decision, he cited that the population had "built up high immunity", that experts were now considering a big pandemic wave during winter unlikely, and that no particularly dangerous variants of the virus were expected to appear in Germany in the nearer future. He appealed to the public to nevertheless voluntary wear masks indoors and on trains. All German states agreed to end the mask requirement in local public transport by early February.

=== March 2023 ===
With effect from 1 March, the remaining requirements of a negative rapid test for access to health facilities were dropped, as was the mask requirement for residents of nursing homes. The mask requirement for visits to medical practices was to continue until 7 April.

=== April 2023 ===
On 5 April, two days before the last protective government measures came to an end, health minister Lauterbach said that the pandemic was over in Germany. He said that he made this assessment based on looking at virus variants, vaccination rates and hospital cases.
