= Elisabeth Scharfenberg =

German politician, MP

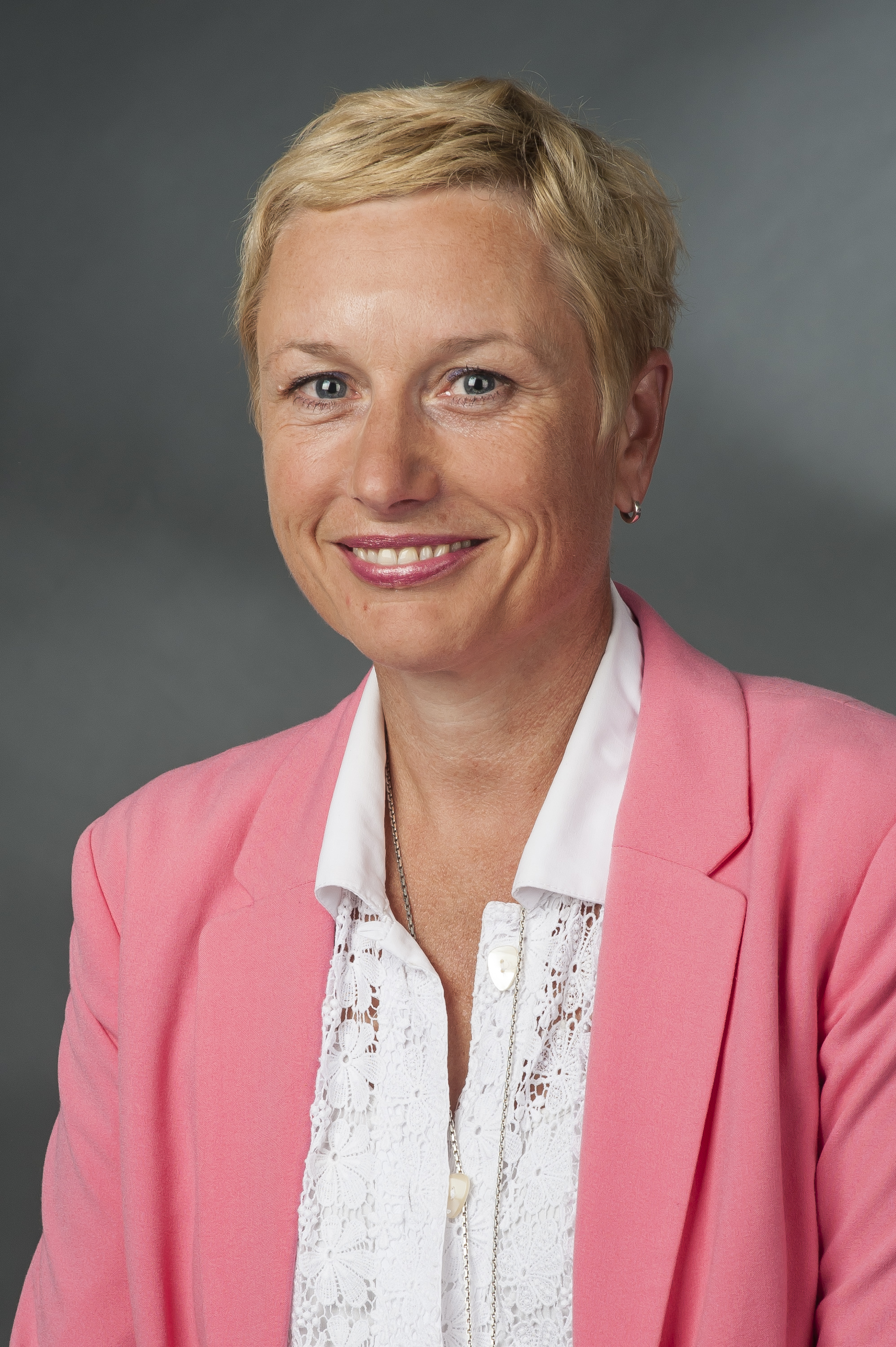
Scharfenberg in 2014

Elisabeth Scharfenberg is a German politician of the Alliance 90/The Greens Party. From 2005 to 2017, she was member of the Federal parliament, the Bundestag. A Graduate social pedagogue, her political work focussed on care and ageing policy.

== Biography ==
Scharfenberg was born on 14 March 1963 in Rüsselsheim, Hesse. There, she got her Abitur in 1982 at the Gustav-Heinemann-Schule. In Berlin, she then studied Social work/social pedagogy.

From 1997, she worked as a freelance professional carer after previously working in the field of adult education.

Scharfenberg joined the Green Party in 1999. After some time in the Upper Franconian District Assembly, she joined the Bundestag in 2005 by being elected through her State List in the 2005 German Federal Election. She was re-elected in 2009 and 2013 but announced that she did not seek further re-election in 2016.

During her time in the parliament she was a member of the Health Committee and a substitute member of the Committee for Family Affairs, Senior Citizens, Women and Youth. Furthermore, she was the spokeswoman for elderly care policy of the Alliance 90/The Greens parliamentary group in the Bundestag.

She is a member of the Kuratorium Deutsche Altershilfe, Internationaler Bund, Bund Naturschutz and Kind & Kegel e.V. - Kultur für alle Generationen (lit. 'Culture for all generations').

=== Private life ===
Scharfenberg is married and has four daughters.

== Further reading and publications ==
- Pflege ist stark: Gelebte Ideen und Zukunftsimpulse Taschenbuch. Vincentz Network. 2018. ISBN 978-3866307643.
