= Health care system of the elderly in Germany =

Health care for the elderly in Germany

The elderly population is one of the most vulnerable populations in the world of health care, mainly because of their susceptibility to contracting disease, limited access to health care insurance, limited or non-existent access to long-term care insurance, and/or reduced quality of life. In Germany, the majority of the population, including the elderly is funded by a public health care insurance system. Only employees who have an income above a cutoff point and certain other groups have the option of purchasing private insurance. (The option of not having any insurance coverage was dropped in 2009.) For the most part, Germany raises money for this health system through statutory welfare contributions.

== Increase in elderly population ==
As a result of longevity and low fertility rates, the elderly population (age 75 and older) in Germany has increased dramatically over the years, and is predicted to increase from 7% of the total population in the last century to over 10% by 2020. The population in need of care is expected to increase from over a million to over 2 million people in 2020, which is about 2% of the population in Germany. 70% of the people, who are elderly and in need of care, live in private households, with a family member being the main caregiver in 80% of these households; daughters and daughters in law being the main caregivers. The continual increase in the elderly population in Germany signifies that there will be a greater need for health care services to be provided to the elderly, notably long-term care services. This increased need places the elderly in a vulnerable position because of the potential of funds not meeting all their needs.

== Long-term care insurance ==
Long-term care insurance was established by the German welfare state in 1996 to give elderly financial resources for a caregiver. This insurance either provides care services or cash benefits to pay for a private caregiver, such as a family member. This provides families with more support from a public institution, now being responsible for financing care for the elderly, unlike formerly when the high expenses of institutional care caused most families to care for their elderly in their own households. The emergence of care insurance has encouraged the growth of private home-care agencies and new residential arrangements for elderly. If a family opted for long-term care insurance to provide care services, they could attain these services through these private agencies; otherwise, they would receive cash benefits that could be used to pay a family member or other individual for informal care services.

== Care service recipients ==
There are significant differences in the use of the long-term care services in Germany, depending on social position, ethnic background, and gender. Those with a higher social position most often utilize home-based services provided by private institutions, while those in a lower social position most often utilize cash benefits. Additionally, German elderly minorities are underrepresented in professionalized home-based services and residential care. This is attributed to the large number of people in informal family care and their different cultures leading to difficulties in adapting to the existing care services. There is also a discrepancy in the numbers of women and men that utilize the care services. 69% of service recipients are women, which is attributed to women constituting the majority of the elderly of over 80 years old, receiving lower pensions, and requiring more care dependency.

== Health care satisfaction ==
In a study conducted in 1992, Louis Harris interviewed 948 elderly people over the age of 65 from Germany in order to have a better understanding of their health care access satisfaction and quality of life. 29% of German elderly are satisfied with their health care. 54% report having fair or poor health; and 38% report having six or more physician contacts over the past six months. 6% of German elderly viewed out-of-pocket medical expenses as a serious issue, 15% viewed Germany's system of paying for medical care as “inadequate”. Overall, a significant proportion of the elderly population are satisfied with their health care, and a very small amount view out-of-pocket medical expenses as a serious issue. Taking this into account along with the long-term care services the elderly are provided, the German elderly generally have good access to short-term and long-term care insurance.

== Increase in health care expenditures ==
Despite their current access to short-term and long-term health insurance services, it is often concluded that the increasing elderly population in Germany will have negative consequences on health care expenditures, which may threaten these services. This is further emphasized by the bankruptcy of the German health insurance fund City BKK recently declared bankruptcy due to the rising number of members and costs, which exceeded its budget from the healthcare fund. There appears to be a linear relationship between the increase of age and increase of health care costs. However, a study conducted by Hilke Brockmann in 2000, suggests that as a person ages, their health care expenses decrease. The study further shows that proximity to death is what increases health costs, not age itself. Furthermore, the decrease in health expenditures as a person ages can be attributed to elderly having less expensive diseases. However, when comparing medical treatment expenses of the same diseases in young and elderly people in Germany, it was discovered that elderly people are still receiving less expensive health care, which suggests that health care is being rationed in Germany based on age, rationing being illegal and potentially responsible for the elderly not receiving the best treatment possible, ultimately, decreasing their potential for survival.

== Depression in elderly population ==
One factor that largely contributes to the costs associated with old age is the presence of mental health issues, namely depression. A study was conducted on 451 primary care patients aged 75 and older. 63 out of the 451 patients were diagnosed with depression. Depressed and non-depressed individuals had similar education levels and did not have significant differences in age and gender. It was found that 14% of depressed individuals used mental health specialist services, while 8% of non-depressed individuals used mental health specialist services were used by 2%; psychiatrists were used by 5% of the depressed elderly and 1% by the non-depressed; and psychologists were used by 2% depressed elderly and 0.5% non-depressed. Additionally, depressed elderly were admitted to hospitals for an average stay of 20.7 days while non-depressed individuals were admitted for an average of 13 days. The overall direct health care costs of depressed elderly were found to be 5422 Euros annually, and in non-depressed elderly 3624 Euros annually. Ultimately, it is unknown how much of the direct health care costs can be attributed to diagnosed and undiagnosed depression, but what is clear that the presence of depression in elderly affects their quality of life, which can potentially be improved if depression is recognized and treated promptly. In addition, prompt treatment of depression may reduce direct health care costs in the elderly population.

== Multiple chronic conditions in elderly population ==
Elderly patients with multiple chronic conditions are also associated with higher health care use and cost. Studies conducted showed that the illness level of the elderly is what directly affects health care use and costs; the illness level was measured as the number of incidences of disease.

== Reduction of health care expenditures ==
In order to reduce some of the health care expenditures associated with the medical conditions of the German elderly, which is largely due to money spent on medications for mental health or chronic conditions, the German government is strictly regulating reimbursement and pricing policies of the pharmaceutical market using cost-effective analysis. This along with the implementation of other policies may reduce health care expenditures related to the elderly, reducing the threat of eliminating some of these services, and helping them have good access to short-term and long-term health care services as well as leading a good quality of life.

== Staffing ==
The demography of Germany makes finding care staff for the increasing proportion of elderly people difficult. Jens Spahn said in 2018 that "Inviting nursing care personnel from our neighboring countries is the nearest option." He is planning a draft law to recruit 8,000 extra staff, but it has been estimated that an extra 100,000 are needed to cover immediate needs. The German Foundation for Patient Rights says that turnover in the sector is high. The German Nurses Association say that commercial providers do not keep to employer-union agreed pay rates.
