= Thomas Mertens (virologist) =

German virologist and government adviser

- Born: 10 March 1950 (age 76); Freiburg im Breisgau, West Germany
- Education: Cologne University
- Occupation: Virologist
- Website: https://www.rki.de/EN/Home/homepage_node.html

Thomas Michael Christian Mertens (born 10 March 1950 in Freiburg im Breisgau) is a German virologist and former head of the Standing Committee on Vaccination (STIKO), which as part of the Robert Koch Institute advises the German government regarding vaccines, in which role he became well-known to a wider audience during the COVID-19 pandemic in Germany.

== Career ==
From 1968 to 1976, Mertens first studied chemistry in Cologne and then medicine in Bonn, where he completed his dissertation (Dr. med.) under the supervision of de:Hans Joachim Eggers in 1976. He obtained his medical license (approbation) in 1977. In 1984 he completed his habilitation in virology. From 1985 until 1991 he was professor at the Institute of Virology in Cologne, after which he moved to University of Ulm, heading the Institute of Virology at the University Clinic there from 1998. In 2018 he retired from his position as professor of virology and medical director. In his research, Mertens worked extensively on herpes viruses, in particular HCMV.

In 2004, Mertens joined the Standing Committee on Vaccination (STIKO), and became its head in 2017. In November 2023, the Federal Ministry of Health announced that a three-term limit would be applied to STIKO members, implying that Mertens would step down at the end of his term in February 2024. In March 2024, Klaus Überla was chosen as new head of STIKO.

== COVID-19 pandemic ==
During the COVID-19 pandemic in Germany, after vaccines became available in late 2020, STIKO and Mertens moved into the focus of politics, the wider public, and the media. Mertens repeatedly criticized what he said was pressure on STIKO from politics. He himself was criticized for having allegedly confused the public on several occasions, and for having announced an upcoming STIKO recommendation for a booster shot for all adults in a talk show, rather than through standard channels, in November 2021.

In early December 2020, shortly before the rollout of the Pfizer–BioNTech COVID-19 vaccine and the Moderna COVID-19 vaccine in Germany, Mertens said that it would take over a year to vaccinate the whole population of Germany, due to capacity limits. In September 2021, Mertens expressed dissatisfaction about vaccine hesitancy in Germany particularly in the age group between 18 and 59 years, stressing the importance of the vaccination rate of that group for the evolution of the fourth wave of the pandemic and beyond.

In early December 2021, Mertens stated in a podcast by Frankfurter Allgemeine Zeitung that if he had a seven- to eight-year old child, he would "probably" refrain from having it vaccinated against the coronavirus at that time; soon after, in a 10 December interview with Die Welt, he however stated that he regretted having said anything personal at all, that any suspicions that he himself was a vaccination sceptic were "complete nonsense", and that he had never opposed vaccination. His previous comment had been taken out of context and had been completely correct and comprehensible, he said. At the time of the Die Welt interview, the STIKO had only recommended vaccination to those children between five and eleven years of age which belonged to risk groups, while also opening it to other children of that age group on the condition that parents had a discussion with a doctor. In May 2022, the RKI updated its vaccine recommendations to include a single shot of an mRNA vaccine for healthy children from the age of five years for the Pfizer–BioNTech vaccine, and from six years for Moderna.

Mertens became an inaugural member of the Corona-Expertenrat (corona advisory panel) established by the Scholz cabinet in December 2021.

In January 2022, Mertens said that he opposed a COVID-19 general vaccine mandate for all aged 18 and over, as this would "divide society". He also expressed doubt about whether such a measure would actually be effective, as even the threat of a fine would possibly not change the minds of those who did not want to be vaccinated. He also opined that the severe COVID-19 wave at that time could not be reined in by a general mandate. In April 2022, he welcomed that the push for a general vaccine mandate had been abandoned in the Bundestag parliament, saying that the "main reason" for such a mandate, namely stemming the spread of the virus, could at present not be achieved through vaccination; and that it was "more sensible to limit the vaccine mandate to vulnerable groups".

In an interview published in November 2023, Mertens said he saw "no real mistakes" in the work of STIKO during the pandemic; criticism directed at the commission had often been "simply wrong". Many decisions, however, had to be made speedily and with limited knowledge.

== Personal life ==
Mertens has four children of adult age. His hobby is playing the clarinet.

== Books (as editor) ==
- Marre, R.; Mertens, T.; Trautmann, M.; Zimmerli, W., eds. (2013). Klinische Infektiologie: Infektionskrankheiten erkennen und behandeln [Clinical Infectiology: Recognizing and Treating Infectious Diseases] (in German) (2nd ed.). Urban & Fischer, Elsevier. ISBN 978-3-437-31355-4.
- Mertens, T., ed. (2004). Diagnostik und Therapie von Viruskrankheiten: Leitlinien der Gesellschaft für Virologie; Kompendium der klinischen Virologie für Studierende und Ärzte [Diagnostics and Therapy of Viral Diseases: Guidelines of the Society of Virology; Compendium of Clinical Virology for Students and Doctors] (in German) (2nd ed.). Urban & Fischer, Elsevier. ISBN 978-3-437-21971-9.
