= Gérard Krause =

German virologist researching emergent viruses

Gérard Krause (born 1965) is a German epidemiologist. He is currently based at the Helmholtz Centre for Infection Research (HZI) in Braunschweig.

== Career ==
After obtaining a doctoral degree in tropical medicine at the University of Heidelberg and several stints as medical doctor and specialist in tropical medicine, Krause moved in 2000 to the Robert Koch Institute, where he worked as an epidemiologist. In 2005 he obtained his habilitation at the Charité in the fields of epidemiology and hygiene. He participated in the successful containment of the Western African Ebola virus epidemic of 2014/2015. As of 2017, he led the SORMAS (Surveillance, Outbreak Response Management and Analysis System) project at the HZI. SORMAS is an open source software for early recording of infectious diseases (that is, surveillance) and the steering of subsequent pandemic protection measures. It was later rolled out in other countries including France, Switzerland and Fiji, performing infection surveillance for more than 270 million people.

The SORMAS software was extended during the COVID-19 pandemic in Germany by a module specifically tailored to the disease, and was expected to help reduce the effort in contact tracing and follow-up of infection chains by health authorities at the district level.

== COVID-19 pandemic ==
During the COVID-19 pandemic in Germany, Krause joined the advisory committee of the federal government and state premiers. During that time, he became known to a wider audience through his contact with the media. The weekly Der Spiegel described him in January 2021 as an advocate of very targeted measures. Krause repeatedly called for better protection of the elderly from the disease. He has been a critic of the threshold value of 50 infections per 100,000 residents in the past seven days as indicator for anti-pandemic measures, and called for the inclusion of other indicators, such as the number of available beds in intensive care.

In an August 2020 interview with Deutschlandfunk, at a time when cases in Germany began to rise again, Krause called for particular attention to the degree of increase in serious cases and deaths, and for adequate protection of those particularly likely to become serious ill from the disease; public attention to this matter was, in his eyes, highly insufficient. Commenting in Der Spiegel on the decision of the German government on 28 October to impose a partial lockdown for November, Krause said that the protection of high-risk groups posed a challenge which society had to be ready to meet. On 19 April 2021, he doubted the benefits of the night curfew from 9:00 p.m. to 5:00 a.m. that was mulled by the federal government, citing the situation in France, where the curfew had been sidestepped through overnight stays after visits outside of the curfew times. He opined against the loosening of the vaccination prioritization before the vaccination of high-risk groups. Instead of the number of reported infections as indicator for pandemic measures, as favored by the federal and state governments, he proposed to use the number of those who fell ill – in particular those requiring intensive care –, arguing that the number of reported infections was bound to increase anyway due to the desirable ramping up of coronavirus testing.

In November 2021, Krause said that COVID-19 vaccination in the healthcare sector should be taken "for granted" to protect patients, and that it was "regrettable" that a government vaccine mandate for the sector had been necessary to achieve this.

== 2022 mpox outbreak ==
In an expert discussion session on 27 May 2022 on research regarding the monkeypox virus which had triggered the 2022–2023 mpox outbreak in Europe, Krause called for the identification of risk groups within the general population. He warned against them being stigmatized, also given that this would make it harder to collect information from some countries. He said that research on monkeypox in Nigeria, in which he had participated, was only conditionally transferable to the situation in Europe, due to the greater prevalence of animal-to-human transmission, the less well equipped health system, and the lower vaccination rate in the African country.
