= German Foundation for Patient Rights =

German patient rights organization

The German Foundation for Patient Rights (DSP) is a pressure group which campaigns to improve the quality of the German healthcare system.

Eugen Brysch is the chair of the foundation.

It focuses particularly on the care of the elderly, and on the commercial incentives which encourage unnecessary operations

It advocates a central licensing system for medical staff. Rather than the present 17 regional medical licensing chambers.

Herbert Möller is a prominent spokesperson for the organisation. He has highlighted the problems created by the quarterly payment system, which makes it difficult for state insurance patients to see doctors towards the end of the quarter. In the months of March, June, September, and December patients have to resort to emergency services because the insurance companies only reimburse the full cost of certain treatments up to particular quarterly targets.
