= Cake and Cunnilingus Day =

Satirical holiday celebrated on 14 April

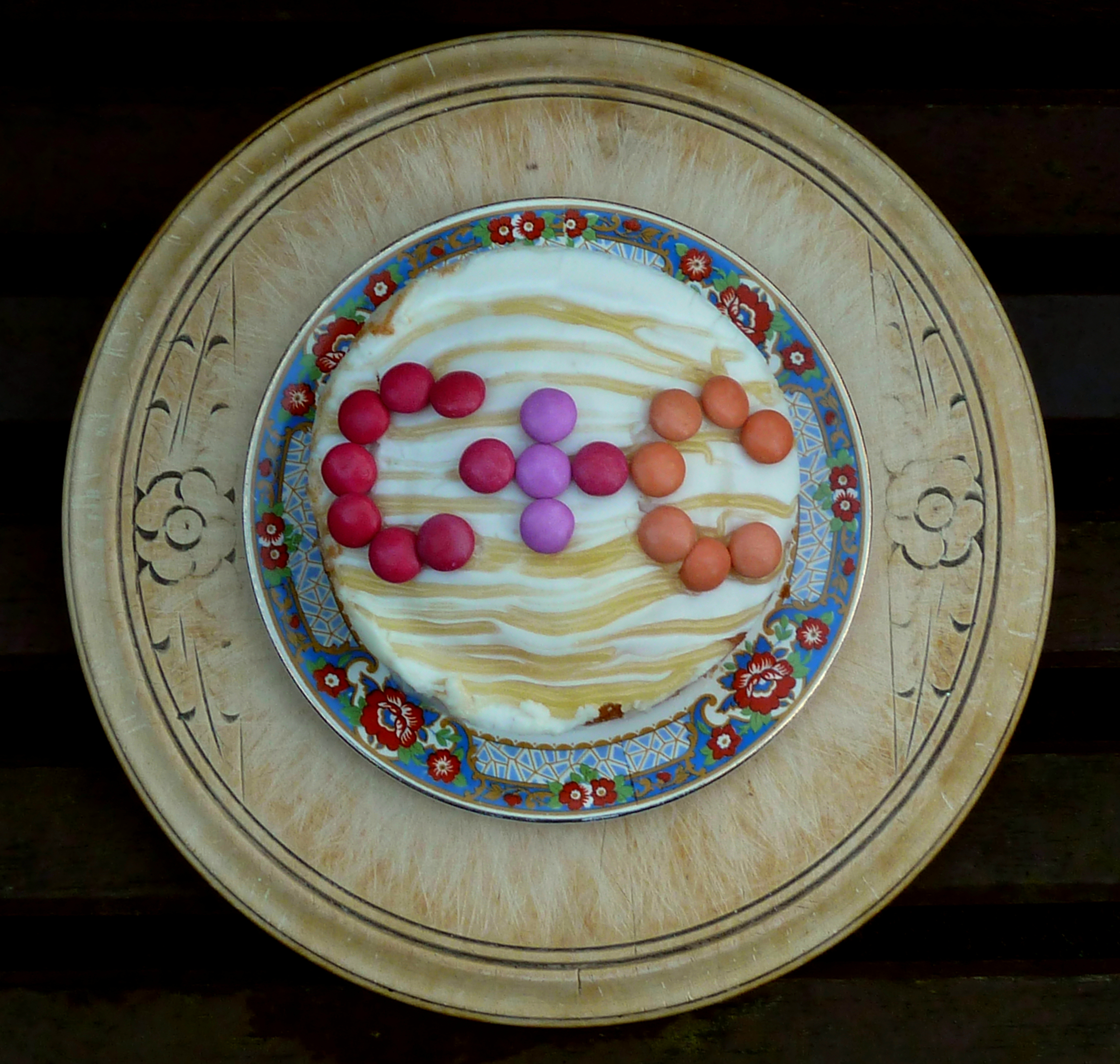
- A cake made for Cake and Cunnilingus Day
- Also called: C & C Day
- Observed by: North America, Australia, Europe, New Zealand
- Type: Unofficial
- Significance: Internet meme
- Observances: Cake, cunnilingus
- Date: April 14
- Next time: 14 April 2027
- Frequency: Annual
- Related to: Steak and Blowjob Day, Valentine's Day

Cake and Cunnilingus Day is a satirical holiday celebrated on 14 April as a female response to Steak and Blowjob Day, which is celebrated on 14 March. It was created in 2006 by web designer, writer and filmmaker Ms. Naughty and has since been adopted in multiple countries as a day to emphasize female enjoyment and honor women.

== Events ==
On this day, women are supposed to eat cake and receive oral sex (cunnilingus). The event has been created as a female response to Steak and Blowjob Day, observed one month before it, and which is itself created as a male response to Valentine's Day. In a similar fashion to Steak and Blowjob Day, which supports breast cancer awareness, Cake and Cunnilingus Day has been intended to support charities such as the Prostate Cancer Foundation.

== History ==
In 2006, web designer, writer and filmmaker Ms. Naughty made a post on her blog proclaiming the day. She wrote, "women should have a day where they get to eat as much cake as they want and enjoy getting their clit licked without hesitation.”

== Reception ==
German daily newspaper Schwarzwälder Bote considered the day to be the equivalent of Steak and Blowjob Day (or "Schnitzel und Blowjob Tag" ("Schniblo") as it is commonly known in Germany), while Stern considered it to be "revenge" for the latter. Online news portal news.de felt that "women are simply great – and therefore cannot be honored and pampered enough days a year. At least that's what they thought when they invented Cake and Cunnilingus Day". The lifestyle magazine Jolie wondered if every day should be Cake and Cunnilingus Day. Swedish night newspaper Expressen and web magazine Nyheter24 stated that it is a day to celebrate female enjoyment, while Göteborgs-Posten listed the day among the holidays celebrated in April. Tonje Olsen, writer at Nytelse.no, stated: "There is a day just for us girls too." Danish newspaper Ekstra Bladet felt that female pleasure must be prioritized. Norwegian online newspaper Nettavisen stated that "the origin of the day is a bit uncertain, but the day has been marked more or less solemnly for several years".

In Spain, ABC, El Confidencial and La Vanguardia consider the day to be International Cunnilingus Day. Russian news website Life claimed that despite it sounding silly, it can bring happiness to couples. Agency of News Unian suggested one "start with a cake, and a bouquet of flowers". Danish daily newspaper Politiken mentions "women living such joyless lives that they have to have an annual anniversary in the calendar to eat cake and feel some sexual pleasure". Ukrainian MPort suggested celebrating the day on March 20.

In Italy, various newspapers were confused about the origins of the day. Il Fatto Quotidiano named the day "festa del sesso orale per sole donne" ("oral sex party for women only").

== See also ==
- Black Day (South Korea)
