= Juno Februata =

Roman festival

A festival said to be of Juno Februata or Juno Februa, though it does not appear in Ovid's Fasti, was described by Alban Butler, famous as the author of Butler's Lives of Saints, who presented an aspect of the Roman Lupercalia as a festival of a "Juno Februata", under the heading of February 14:

To abolish the heathens' lewd superstitious custom of boys drawing the names of girls, in honour of their goddess Februata Juno, on the fifteenth of this month, several zealous pastors substituted the names of saints in billets, given on this day.

Jack Oruch, who noted Butler's inventive confusion, noted that it was embellished by Francis Douce, in Illustrations of Shakespeare, and of Ancient Manners, new ed. London, 1839, p 470, who took such a festival for the Lupercalia, which was celebrated, he asserted,

during a great art of the month of February.... in honour of Pan and Juno... On this occasion, amidst a variety of ceremonies, the names of young women were put into a box, from which they were drawn by the men as chance directed." Douce repeated Butler's description of the attempt to substitute saint's names, and concluded that "as the festival of the Lupercalia had commenced about the middle of February, [the Christians] appear to have chosen Saint Valentine's day for celebrating the new feast; because it occurred nearly at the same time.

The connection thus begun has been uncritically repeated to the modern day: but see Valentine's Day and Saint Valentine.

The epithet or divine cognomen of Juno Purified and Purifying, Juno Februata, Februlis, Februta or Februalis is noted in William Smith, (1870) 1898. Dictionary of Greek and Roman Biography and Mythology with a reference to Sextus Pompeius Festus Februarius, to Ovid's poem on the Roman festivals, Fasti, ii.441, which however refers to Juno Lucina in the context of restoring the fertility of Roman women and to Arnobius' sarcastic fourth-century attack on pagan customs, Adversus Nationes.

The adjective februata is unusual and highly specific, unlike broader, more familiar Latin terms: Ovid was at pains to elucidate februa in Fasti. "The narrowness of meaning in febrare, no synonym of purgare or even of lustrare suggests borrowing, an importation which never had a place in the popular language," Joshua Whatmough remarked. He noted that Varro considered it Sabine in origin.
