= Steak and Blowjob Day =

Satirical unofficial holiday on March 14

- Also called: Steak and Knobber Day; Steak & BJ Day
- Observed by: North America; Australia; Europe; New Zealand
- Type: Unofficial
- Significance: Internet meme
- Observances: Steak; fellatio
- Date: March 14
- Next time: 14 March 2027
- Frequency: Annual
- Related to: Valentine's Day; Cake and Cunnilingus Day

Steak and Blowjob Day (sometimes Steak & BJ Day or Steak and Knobber Day) is a satirical unofficial holiday created in the United States as a male response to Valentine's Day and celebrated a month later, on March 14. On the day, women are purportedly supposed to cook a filet steak for and perform fellatio on a man in response to cards, chocolate, flowers and other gifts given by men on Valentine's Day.

The observance has no official status, being a popular Internet meme rather than an actual holiday, but various souvenirs and video clips have been produced about it. It was conceived in 2002 by DJ Tom Birdsey on WFNX radio.

It has been suggested that Steak and Blowjob Day is a backlash against the feminist movement; the holiday has been criticized as sexist and patriarchal, though it has also been positively received by some, and used as a platform to fundraise for breast cancer research.

== History ==
Several websites claim to be the official site of Steak and Blowjob Day, but none of them identify as the creator. The sites concur that the holiday was devised by radio DJ Tom Birdsey in 2002, during a show on WFNX radio station in Boston, Massachusetts. One of the various websites competing to be the "official" page of the day stated "March 14th henceforth became 'Steak and Blowjob Day.' Simple, effective, and self-explanatory. No cards, no flowers, no special nights on the town; the name explains it all: just a steak and a BJ. That's it." The "official" websites provide guides on how best to cook steak and how to best perform fellatio.

The day of celebration is sometimes suggested to be March 20 instead of March 14, either because the former was proclaimed to be Steak and Knobber Day by another radio host Dave Rickards in 1998, or because the latter coincides with Pi Day, which observes the mathematical constant π (pi).

A female equivalent of the day is Cake and Cunnilingus Day on April 14.

== Reception ==
According to the women's historian Lois Banner, the day appeared to be part of the backlash against the feminist movement, moving toward a version of human interaction inherent to hookup culture, and that men "are really frightened because women are outperforming them". Activist Feminista Jones argues that it limits women's freedom of choice, thus being in the mainstream of traditional patriarchal restriction of female sexual behaviours. The sexual educator Walker Thornton wrote that the day, although silly, emphasized for her the issues she had with the modern worldview of Valentine's Day. Men's Health was unsure whether the holiday was actually celebrated, or whether the whole thing was a joke. Student newspaper The Brown Daily Herald discussed the gender and sexual political implications surrounding the meme, suggesting that fellatio is considered by many to be a job the giver must endure as opposed to a form of enjoyment, and in the framing of Steak and Blowjob Day as a "man’s holiday" aimed at obtaining payback for Valentine's Day, this is perpetuated. The Daily Dot considers it a "lame joke gone viral".

Lifestyle blog YourTango felt the idea of such a holiday was an enshrining of male privilege and was, like Valentine's Day, a "silly calendar filler". The Huffington Post stated that the day "made them want to gag", and FHM and the Daily Mirror noted that businesses were cashing in on the unofficial holiday.

The concept of a men's movement looking to create such a day has caused some controversy and incited opposition, being described as antifeminist or patriarchal. The men's magazine Maxim described it as the greatest holiday of all time, whereas Cosmopolitan was unsure whether it was an outdated and sexist event or a bawdy celebration of sex and food. One opinion piece on the day suggested it was Neanderthal in trying to force through the idea of a day devoted to the combination of fellatio and steak, and suggested a range of alternatives.

The holiday has drawn attention from various celebrities, including Christina Aguilera, who encouraged her fans to celebrate it in 2014.

In 2016, Instinct noted that the day is also now being used as a way to successfully raise money for breast cancer research. In Germany, Bild noted the day is known as Schnitzel und Blowjob Tag, or Schniblo for short, and in France, female-targeted magazine MadmoiZelle noted it was a day targeted at men, while Le Bonbon said it was a "most American holiday". In Spain, daily newspaper El Mundo noted in Spain it would be called Día del Solomillo y el Sexo Oral and that the day joined food and sex, which it opined were two of the greatest pleasures in the world.

== See also ==
- Cake and Cunnilingus Day

Same date

- Pi Day
- White Day
