= Valentine's Day =

Holiday observed on February 14

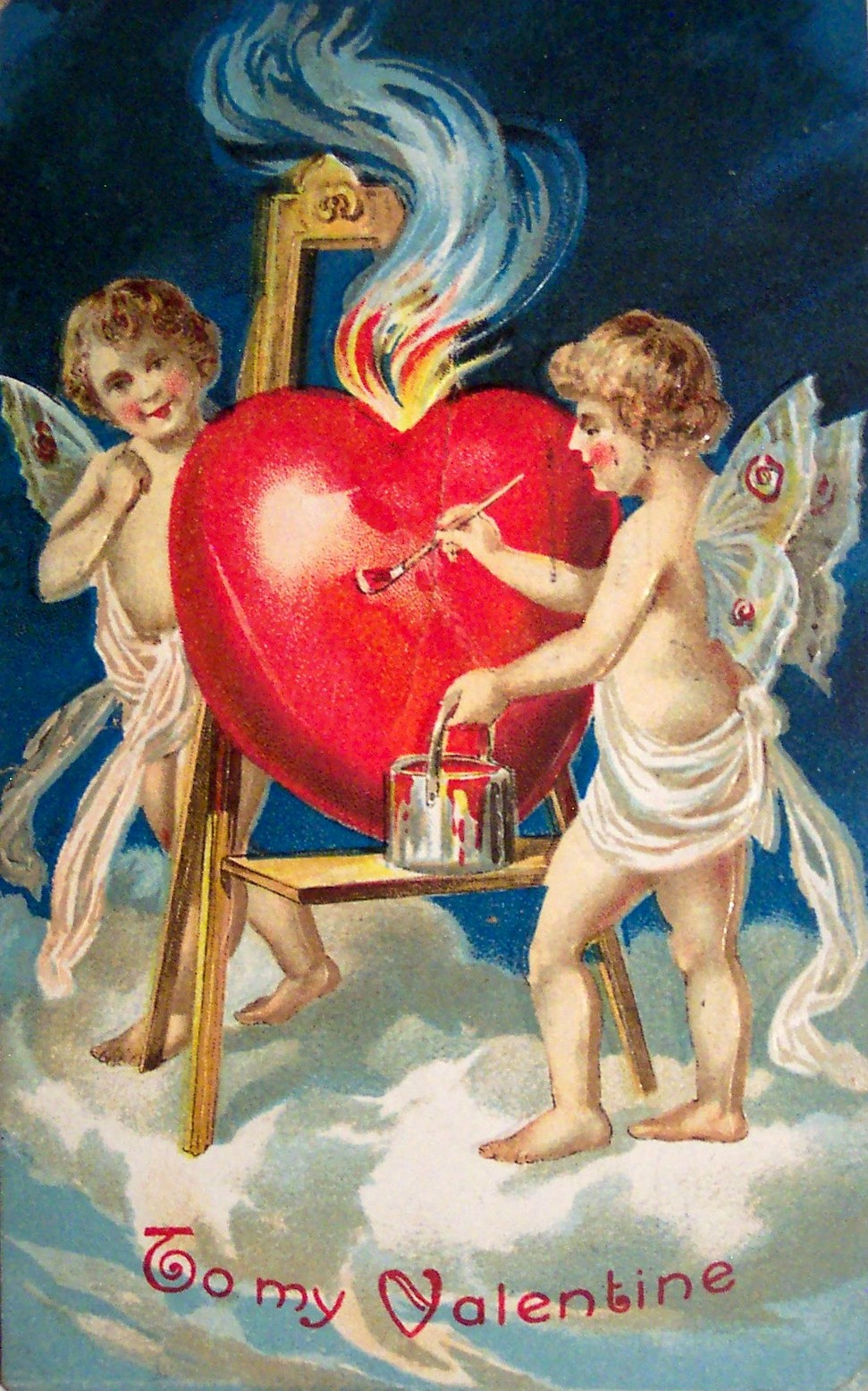
- A Valentine's card, c. 1909
- Also called: Saint Valentine's Day or the Feast of Saint Valentine
- Observed by: People in many countries; Anglican Communion (see calendar); Lutheran Churches (see calendar); Catholic Church (see calendar) (Note: St. Valentine's February 14 feast day was removed by the Catholic Church from the General Roman Calendar in 1969 due to historical uncertainty about the saint (It was replaced with the feast day of Saints Cyril and Methodius). However, Saint Valentine's feast day remains celebrated on February 14 in some local liturgical calendars and by traditionalist Catholics who use the pre-Vatican II General Roman Calendar. The Roman Martyrology also remembers him on February 14.)
- Type: Christian, romantic, cultural, commercial observance
- Significance: Feast day of Saint Valentine; the celebration of love and affection
- Observances: Sending greeting cards and gifts, dating, church services, novenas
- Date: February 14 (fixed by Western Christianity); July 6 (fixed by the Eastern Orthodox Church); July 30 (fixed by the Eastern Orthodox Church)
- Frequency: Annual

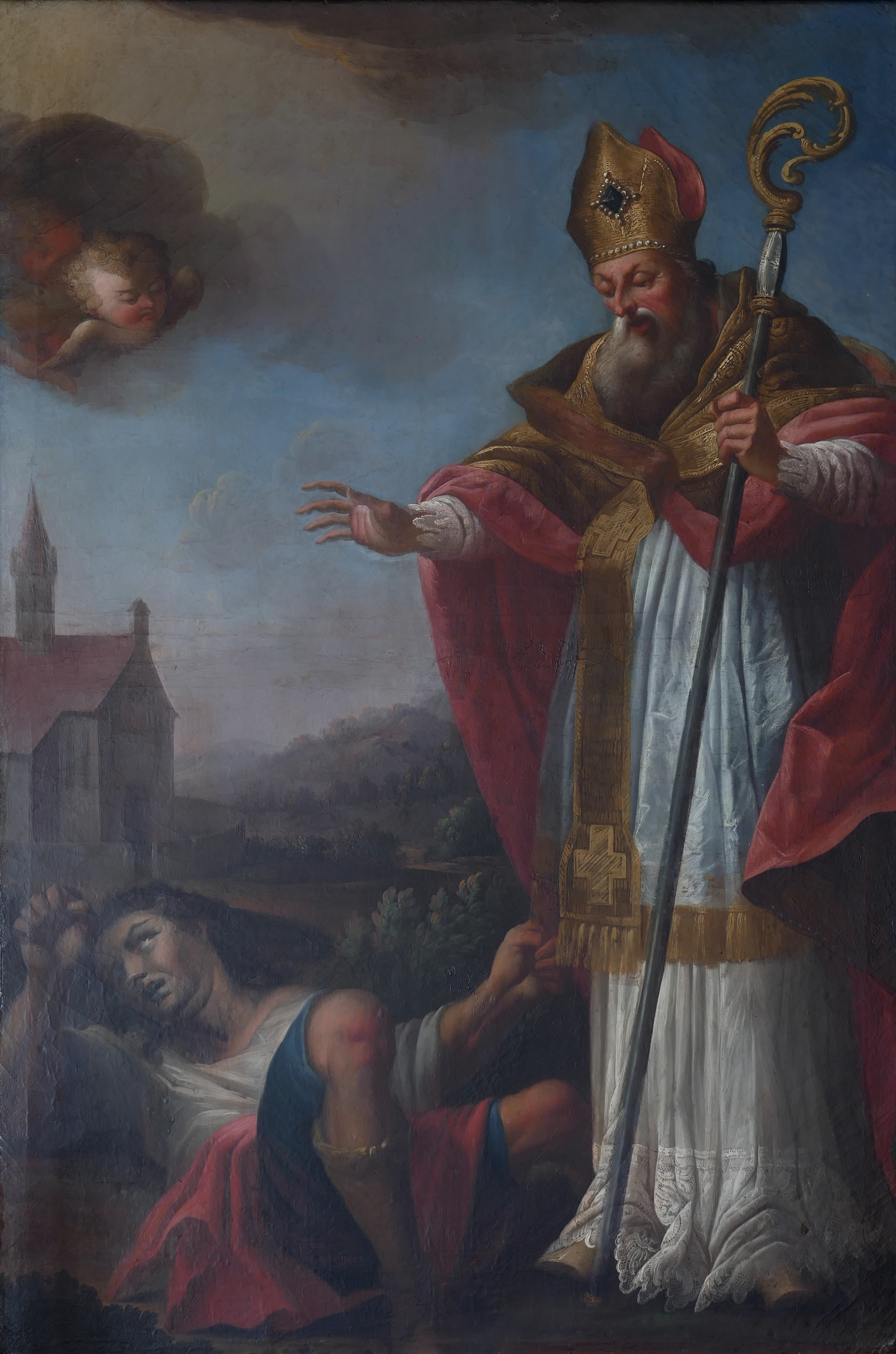
Saint Valentine

Valentine's Day, also called Saint Valentine's Day or the Feast of Saint Valentine, is celebrated annually on February 14. It originated as a Christian feast day honoring a martyr named Valentine, and through later folk traditions it has also become a significant cultural, religious and commercial celebration of romance, commitment, and love in many regions of the world.

There are a number of martyrdom stories associated with various Saint Valentines connected to February 14, including an account of the imprisonment of Saint Valentine of Rome for ministering to Christians persecuted under the Roman Empire in the third century. According to an early tradition, Saint Valentine restored sight to the blind daughter of his jailer. Numerous later additions to the legend have better related it to the theme of love: tradition maintains that Saint Valentine performed weddings for Christian soldiers who were forbidden to marry by the Roman emperor; an 18th-century embellishment to the legend claims he wrote the jailer's daughter a letter signed "Your Valentine" as a farewell before his execution.

The 8th-century Gelasian Sacramentary recorded the celebration of the Feast of Saint Valentine on February 14. The day became associated with romantic love in the 14th and 15th centuries, when notions of courtly love flourished, apparently by association with the "lovebirds" of early spring. In 18th-century England, it grew into an occasion for couples to express their love for each other by presenting flowers, offering confectionery, and sending greeting cards (known as "valentines"). Valentine's Day symbols that are used today include the heart-shaped outline, doves, and the figure of the winged Cupid. In the 19th century, handmade cards gave way to mass-produced greetings. In Italy, Saint Valentine's keys are given to lovers "as a romantic symbol and an invitation to unlock the giver's heart", as well as to children to ward off epilepsy (called Saint Valentine's Malady).

The Feast of Saint Valentine is a day of commemoration in the Lutheran Church, being listed in the calendar of saints, as well as in the Anglican Communion. Many parts of the Eastern Orthodox Church celebrate Saint Valentine's Day on July 6 in honor of Roman presbyter Saint Valentine, and on July 30 in honor of Hieromartyr Valentine, the Bishop of Interamna (modern Terni).

== Saint Valentine ==
=== History ===
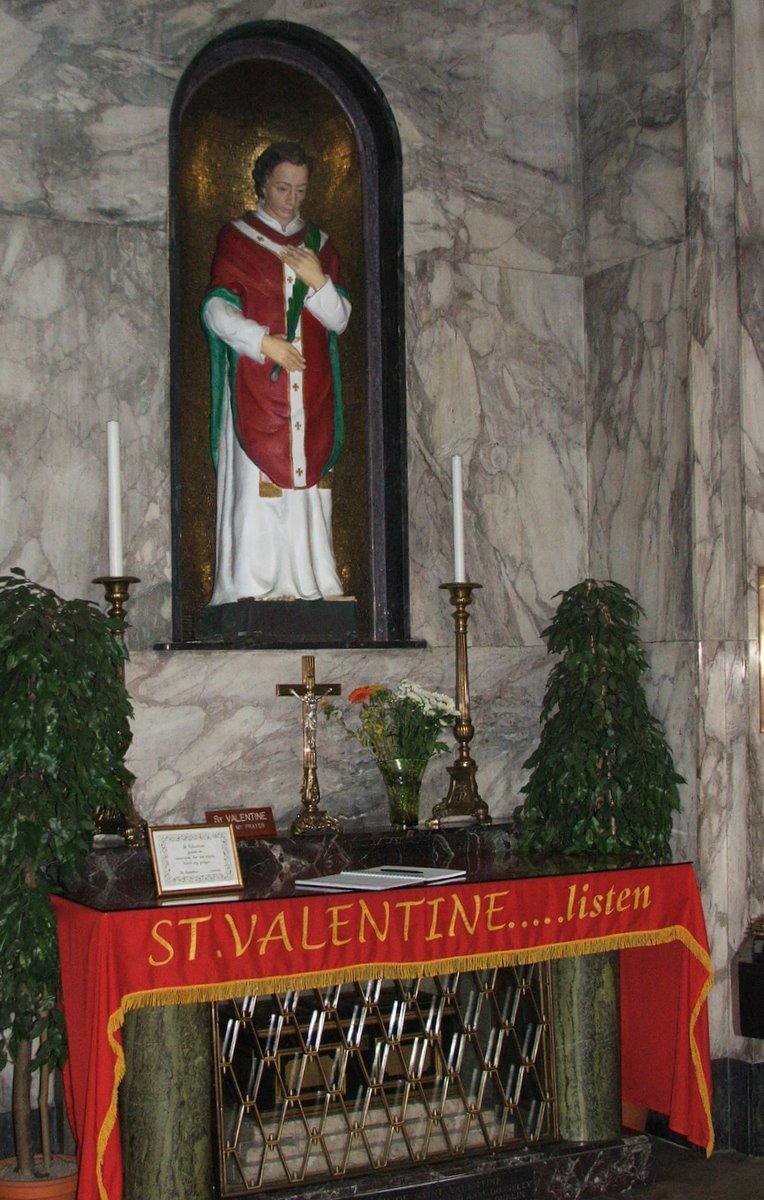
Shrine of St. Valentine in Whitefriar Street Carmelite Church in Dublin, Ireland

Numerous early Christian martyrs were named Valentine. The Valentines honored on February 14 are Valentine of Rome (Valentinus presb. m. Romae) and Valentine of Terni (Valentinus ep. Interamnensis m. Romae). Valentine of Rome was a priest in Rome who was martyred in 269 and was buried on the Via Flaminia. The relics of Saint Valentine were kept in the Church and Catacombs of San Valentino in Rome, which "remained an important pilgrim site throughout the Middle Ages until the relics of Saint Valentine were transferred to the church of Santa Prassede during the pontificate of Nicholas IV [1288–1292]". The flower-crowned skull of Saint Valentine is exhibited in the Basilica of Santa Maria in Cosmedin, Rome. Other relics are found at Whitefriar Street Carmelite Church in Dublin, Ireland.

Valentine of Terni became bishop of Interamna (now Terni, in central Italy) and is said to have been martyred during the persecution under Emperor Aurelian in 273. He is buried on the Via Flaminia, but in a different location from Valentine of Rome. His relics are at the Basilica of Saint Valentine in Terni (Basilica di San Valentino). Professor Jack B. Oruch of the University of Kansas notes that "abstracts of the acts of the two saints were in nearly every church and monastery of Europe." A relic claimed to be Saint Valentine of Terni's head was preserved in the abbey of New Minster, Winchester, and venerated.

The Catholic Encyclopedia speaks of a third saint named Valentine who was mentioned in early martyrologies under the date of February 14. He was martyred in Africa with several companions, but nothing more is known about him.

February 14 is celebrated as Saint Valentine's Day in various Christian denominations; it has, for example, the rank of "commemoration" in the calendar of saints in the Anglican Communion. The feast day of Saint Valentine is given in the calendar of saints of the Lutheran Church. In the 1969 revision of the Roman Catholic Calendar of Saints, the feast day of Saint Valentine on February 14 was relegated from the General Roman Calendar to particular (local or even national) calendars for the following reason: "Though the memorial of Saint Valentine is ancient, it is left to particular calendars, since, apart from his name, nothing is known of Saint Valentine except that he was buried on the Via Flaminia on February 14." Therefore, as he remains within the Roman Martyrology, he may be recognised optionally during mass outside of Christmastide and Eastertide.

The feast day is still celebrated in Balzan (Malta), where relics of the saint are claimed to be found, and also throughout the world by Traditionalist Catholics who follow the older, pre-Second Vatican Council calendar (see General Roman Calendar of 1960).

In the Eastern Orthodox Church, Saint Valentine is recognized on July 6, on which Saint Valentine, the Roman presbyter, is honoured; in addition, the Eastern Orthodox Church observes the feast of Hieromartyr Valentine, Bishop of Interamna, on July 30.

=== Legends ===
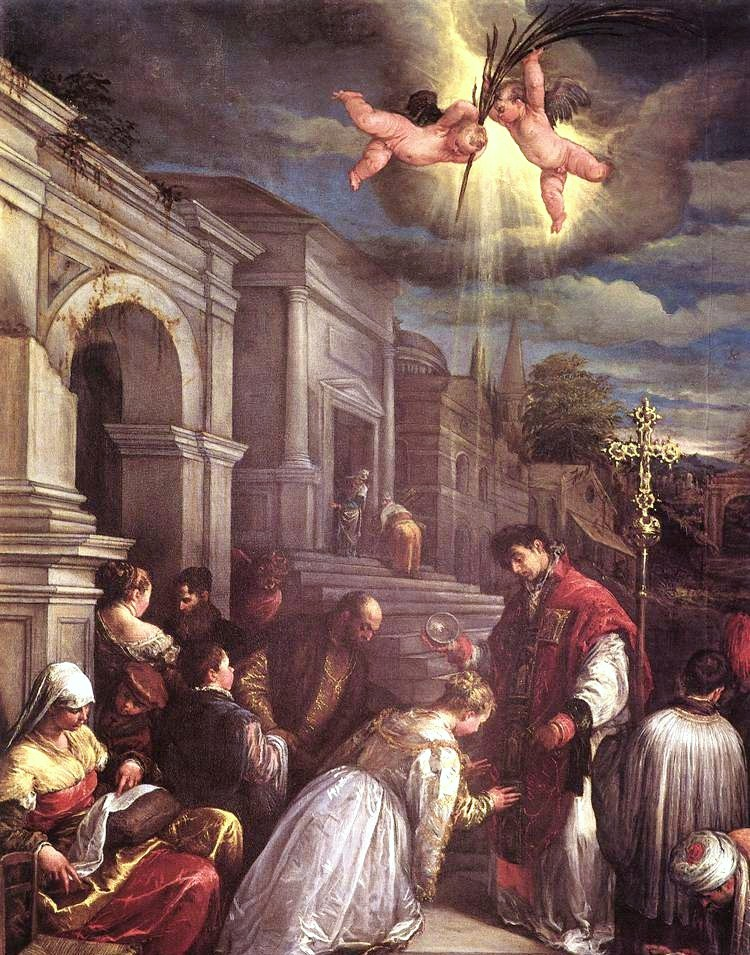
St Valentine baptizing St Lucilla, Jacopo Bassano

J.C. Cooper, in The Dictionary of Christianity, writes that Saint Valentine was "a priest of Rome who was imprisoned for succouring persecuted Christians." Contemporary records of Saint Valentine were most probably destroyed during this Diocletianic Persecution in the early 4th century. In the 5th or 6th century, a work called Passio Marii et Marthae published a story of martyrdom for Saint Valentine of Rome, perhaps by borrowing tortures that happened to other saints, as was usual in the literature of that period.

The same events are found in Bede's Martyrology, which was compiled in the 8th century. It states that Saint Valentine was persecuted as a Christian and interrogated by Roman Emperor Claudius II in person. Claudius was impressed by Valentine and had a discussion with him, attempting to get him to convert to Roman paganism in order to save his life. Valentine refused and tried to convert Claudius to Christianity instead. Because of this, he was executed. Before his execution, he is reported to have performed a miracle by healing Julia, the blind daughter of his jailer Asterius. The jailer's daughter and his forty-six member household, family members and servants, came to believe in Jesus and were baptized.

A later Passio embellished the legend by claiming Pope Julius I built a basilica over the saint's sepulchre; this account likely confuses the martyr with a 4th-century tribune named Valentino, who donated land for a church during Julius's pontificate. The legend was picked up as fact by later martyrologies, starting with Bede's martyrology in the 8th century. It was repeated in the 13th century, in The Golden Legend.

There is an additional embellishment to The Golden Legend, which according to Henry Ansgar Kelly, was added in the 18th century and widely repeated. On the evening before Valentine was to be executed, he is supposed to have written the first "valentine" card himself, addressed to the daughter of his jailer Asterius, who was no longer blind, signing as "Your Valentine." The expression "From your Valentine" was later adopted by modern Valentine letters. This legend has been published by both American Greetings and The History Channel.

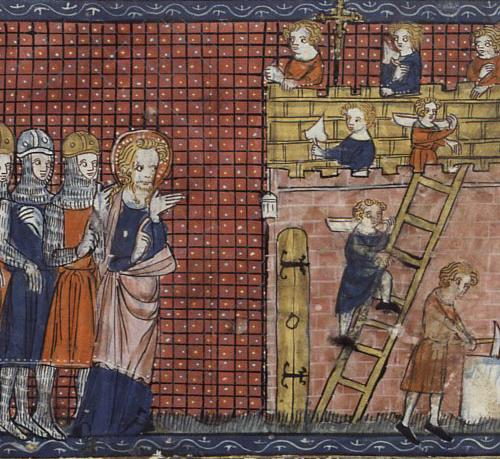
Saint Valentine of Terni and his disciples

John Foxe, a 16th-century English historian, and the Order of Carmelites state that Saint Valentine was buried in the Church of Saint Praxedes in Rome, located near the cemetery of Saint Hippolytus. This order says that according to legend, "Julia herself planted a pink-blossomed almond tree near his grave. Today, the almond tree remains a symbol of abiding love and friendship."

Another embellishment suggests that Saint Valentine performed clandestine Christian weddings for soldiers who were forbidden to marry. The Roman Emperor Claudius II supposedly forbade this in order to grow his army, believing that married men did not make for good soldiers. However, George Monger writes that this marriage ban was never issued and that Claudius II told his soldiers to take two or three women for themselves after his victory over the Goths.

According to legend, in order "to remind these men of their vows and God's love, Saint Valentine is said to have cut hearts from parchment", giving them to these soldiers and persecuted Christians, a possible origin of the widespread use of hearts on Saint Valentine's Day.

Saint Valentine supposedly wore a purple amethyst ring, customarily worn on the hands of Christian bishops with an image of Cupid engraved in it, a recognizable symbol associated with love that was legal under the Roman Empire; Roman soldiers would recognize the ring and ask him to perform marriage for them. Probably due to the association with Saint Valentine, amethyst has become the birthstone of February, which is thought to attract love.

== Folk traditions ==
While the European folk traditions connected with Saint Valentine and Saint Valentine's Day have become marginalized by modern customs connecting the day with romantic love, there are still some connections with the advent of spring.

While the custom of sending cards, flowers, chocolates and other gifts originated in the UK, Valentine's Day still remains connected with various regional customs in England. In Norfolk, a character called "Jack" Valentine knocks on the rear door of houses, leaving sweets and presents for children. Although he was leaving treats, many children were scared of this mystical person.

In Slovenia, Saint Valentine or Zdravko was one of the saints of spring, the saint of good health and the patron of beekeepers and pilgrims. A proverb says that "Saint Valentine brings the keys of roots". Plants and flowers start to grow on this day. It has been celebrated as the day when the first work in the vineyards and in the fields commences. It is also said that birds propose to each other or marry on that day. Another proverb says "Valentin – prvi spomladin" ('Valentine – the first spring saint'), as in some places (especially White Carniola), Saint Valentine marks the beginning of spring. Valentine's Day has only recently been celebrated as the day of love. The day of love was traditionally March 12, Saint Gregory's day, or February 22, Saint Vincent's Day. The patron of love was Saint Anthony, whose day has been celebrated on June 13.

== Connection with romantic love ==
=== Possible ancient origins ===
The "Feast" (Latin: in natali, lit. 'on the birthday') of Saint Valentine originated in Christendom and has been marked by the Western Church of Christendom in honour of one of the Christian martyrs named Valentine, as recorded in the 8th-century Gelasian Sacramentary. In Ancient Rome, Lupercalia was observed February 13–15 on behalf of Pan and Juno, pagan gods of love, marriage and fertility. It was a rite connected to purification and health, and had only slight connection to fertility (as a part of health) and none to love. The celebration of Saint Valentine is not known to have had any romantic connotations until Chaucer's poetry about "Valentine's Day" in the 14th century, some seven hundred years after celebration of Lupercalia is believed to have ceased.

Lupercalia was a festival local to the city of Rome. The more general Festival of Juno Februa, meaning "Juno the purifier" or "the chaste Juno", was celebrated on February 13–14. Although the Pope Gelasius I (492–496) article in the Catholic Encyclopedia says that he abolished Lupercalia, theologian and Methodist minister Bruce Forbes wrote that "no evidence" has been demonstrated to link Saint Valentine's Day and the rites of the ancient Roman purification festival of Lupercalia, despite claims by many authors to the contrary. (Note: For example, one source claims incorrectly that "Pope Gelasius I muddled things in the 5th century by combining St. Valentine's Day with Lupercalia to expel the pagan rituals." Seipel, Arnie, The Dark Origins Of Valentine's Day, National Public Radio, February 13, 2011)

Some researchers have theorized that Gelasius I replaced Lupercalia with the celebration of the Purification of the Blessed Virgin Mary and claim a connection to the 14th century's connotations of romantic love, but there is no historical indication that he ever intended such a thing. (Note: Ansgar, 1976, pp. 60–61. The replacement of Lupercalia with Saint Valentine's celebration was suggested by researchers Kellog and Cox. Ansgar says "It is hardly credible, then, that Pope Gelasius could have introduced the feast of the Purification to counteract the Lupercalia, and in fact the historical records of his pontificate give no hint of such an action.") Also, the dates do not fit because at the time of Gelasius I, the feast was only celebrated in Jerusalem, and it was on February 14 only because Jerusalem placed the Nativity of Jesus (Christmas) on January 6. (Note: Ansgar, 1976, pp. 60–61. This feast is celebrated 40 days after the Nativity. In Jerusalem the Nativity was celebrated on January 6, and this feast in February 14. But, in the West and even in Eastern places such as Antioch and Alexandria, Nativity was celebrated on December 25, and this Purification was not celebrated. When this feast was introduced to Rome, it was directly placed in February 2. Around that time, Jerusalem adopted the Nativity date of December 25 and moved the Purification to February 2.) Although it was called "Purification of the Blessed Virgin Mary", it also dealt with the presentation of Jesus at the temple. Jerusalem's Purification of the Blessed Virgin Mary on February 14 became the Presentation of Jesus at the Temple on February 2 as it was introduced to Rome and other places in the sixth century, after Gelasius I's time.

While sometimes repeated uncritically by modern sources that men or boys drew names of women or girls from a jar to couple for the duration of Lupercalia, there is no ancient evidence for any kind of lottery or sortition scheme pairing couples for sex. The first descriptions of this fictitious lottery appeared in the 15th century in relation to Valentine's Day, with a connection to the Lupercalia first asserted in 18th century antiquarian works, such as those by Alban Butler (The Lives of the Fathers, Martyrs, and Other Principal Saints, 1756–1759) and Francis Douce. These modern sources claimed that the fictional Lupercalia was the source of the practice of sending valentines.

The practice of sending valentines originated in the Middle Ages, with no link to Lupercalia, with boys drawing the names of girls at random. This custom was combated by priests, for example by Frances de Sales around 1600, apparently by replacing it with a religious custom of girls drawing the names of apostles from the altar. However, this religious custom is recorded as early as the 13th century in the life of Saint Elizabeth of Hungary, so it could have a different origin.

=== Chaucer's Parliament of Fowls ===
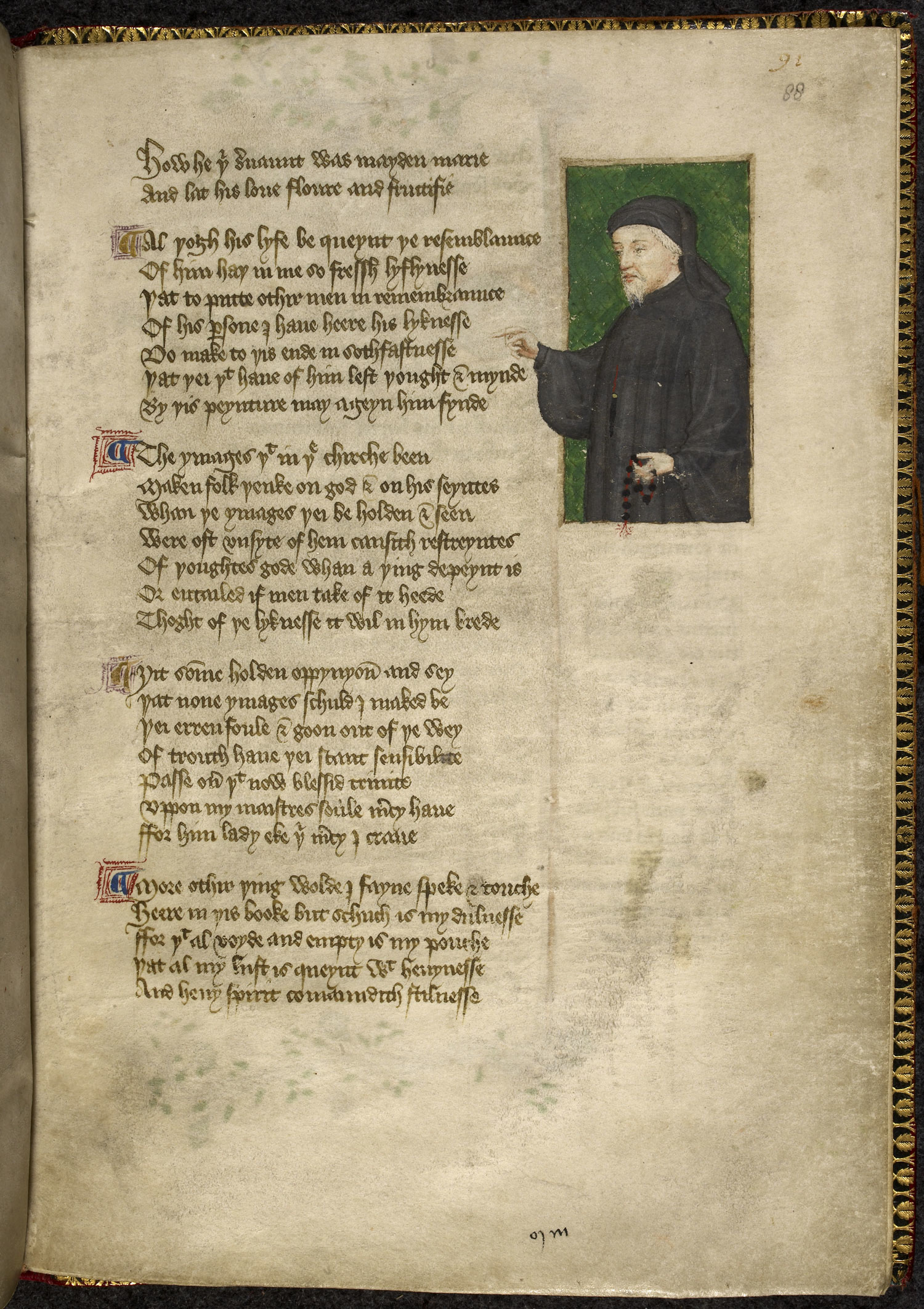
Geoffrey Chaucer by Thomas Hoccleve (1412)

The first recorded association of Saint Valentine's Day with romantic love is believed to be in the Parliament of Fowls (1382) by Geoffrey Chaucer, a dream vision portraying a parliament for birds to choose their mates. Honouring the first anniversary of the engagement of fifteen-year-old King Richard II of England to fifteen-year-old Anne of Bohemia, Chaucer wrote (in Middle English):

"For this was on seynt Valentynes day
Whan every foul cometh there to chese his make
Of every kynde that men thynke may
And that so huge a noyse gan they make
That erthe, and eyr, and tre, and every lake
So ful was, that unethe was there space
For me to stonde, so ful was al the place."

In modern English:

"For this was on Saint Valentine's Day
When every fowl comes there to choose his match
Of every kind that men may think of
And that so huge a noise they began to make
That earth and air and tree and every lake
Was so full, that not easily was there space
For me to stand—so full was all the place."

Readers have uncritically assumed that Chaucer was referring to February 14 as Saint Valentine's Day. Henry Ansgar Kelly has observed that Chaucer might have had in mind the feast day of St. Valentine of Genoa, an early bishop of Genoa who died around AD 307; it was probably celebrated on May 3. A treaty providing for Richard II and Anne's marriage, the subject of the poem, was signed on May 2, 1381.

Jack B. Oruch notes that the date on which spring begins has changed since Chaucer's time because of the precession of the equinoxes and the introduction of the more accurate Gregorian calendar only in 1582. On the Julian calendar in use in Chaucer's time, February 14 would have fallen on the date now called February 23, a time when some birds have started mating and nesting in England.

Chaucer's Parliament of Fowls refers to a supposedly established tradition, but there is no record of such a tradition before Chaucer. The speculative derivation of sentimental customs from the distant past began with 18th-century antiquaries, notably Alban Butler, the author of Butler's Lives of Saints, and have been perpetuated even by respectable modern scholars. Most notably, "the idea that Valentine's Day customs perpetuated those of the Roman Lupercalia has been accepted uncritically and repeated, in various forms, up to the present".

Three other authors who made poems about birds mating on St. Valentine's Day around the same years: Otton de Grandson from Savoy, John Gower from England, and a knight called Pardo from Valencia. Chaucer most probably predated all of them; but due to the difficulty of dating medieval works, it is not yet known which of the four may have influenced the others.

=== Court of love ===
The earliest description of February 14 as an annual celebration of love appears in the Charter of the Court of Love. The charter, allegedly issued by Charles VI of France at Mantes-la-Jolie in 1400, describes lavish festivities to be attended by several members of the royal court, including a feast, amorous song and poetry competitions, jousting and dancing. Amid these festivities, the attending ladies would hear and rule on disputes from lovers. No other record of the court exists, and none of those named in the charter were present at Mantes except Charles's queen, Isabeau of Bavaria, who may well have imagined it all while waiting out a plague.

=== Valentine poetry ===
The earliest surviving valentine is a 15th-century rondeau written by Charles, Duke of Orléans to his wife, which commences.

"Je suis desja d'amour tanné
Ma tres doulce Valentinée..."

— Charles d'Orléans, Rondeau VI, lines 1–2

At the time, the duke was being held in the Tower of London following his capture at the Battle of Agincourt, 1415.

The earliest surviving valentines in English appear to be those in the Paston Letters, written in 1477 by Margery Brews to her future husband John Paston "my right well-beloved Valentine".

Saint Valentine's Day is mentioned ruefully by Ophelia in William Shakespeare's Hamlet (1600–1601):

"To-morrow is Saint Valentine's day,
All in the morning betime,
And I a maid at your window,
To be your Valentine.
Then up he rose, and donn'd his clothes,
And dupp'd the chamber-door;
Let in the maid, that out a maid
Never departed more."

— William Shakespeare, Hamlet, Act IV, Scene 5

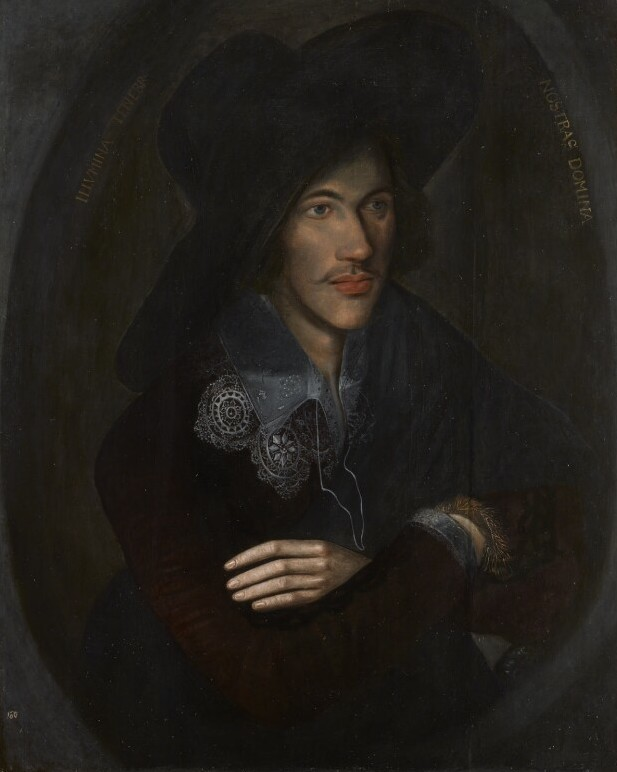
Noted poet John Donne, c. 1595

John Donne used the legend of the marriage of the birds as the starting point for his epithalamion celebrating the marriage of Elizabeth, daughter of James I of England, and Frederick V, Elector Palatine, on Valentine's Day:

"Hayle Bishop Valentine whose day this is

All the Ayre is thy Diocese
And all the chirping Queristers
And other birds ar thy parishioners
Thou marryest every yeare
The Lyrick Lark, and the graue whispering Doue,
The Sparrow that neglects his life for loue,
The houshold bird with the redd stomacher
Thou makst the Blackbird speede as soone,
As doth the Goldfinch, or the Halcyon
The Husband Cock lookes out and soone is spedd
And meets his wife, which brings her feather-bed.
This day more cheerfully than ever shine

This day which might inflame thy selfe old Valentine."

— John Donne, Epithalamion Vpon Frederick Count Palatine and the Lady Elizabeth marryed on St. Valentines day

The verse "Roses are red" echoes conventions traceable as far back as Edmund Spenser's epic The Faerie Queene (1590):

"She bath'd with roses red, and violets blew,
And all the sweetest flowres [sic], that in the forrest grew."

The modern cliché Valentine's Day poem can be found in Gammer Gurton's Garland (1784), a collection of English nursery rhymes published in London by Joseph Johnson:

"The rose is red, the violet's blue,

The honey's sweet, and so are you.
Thou art my love and I am thine;
I drew thee to my Valentine:
The lot was cast and then I drew,

And Fortune said it shou'd be you."

=== Modern times ===
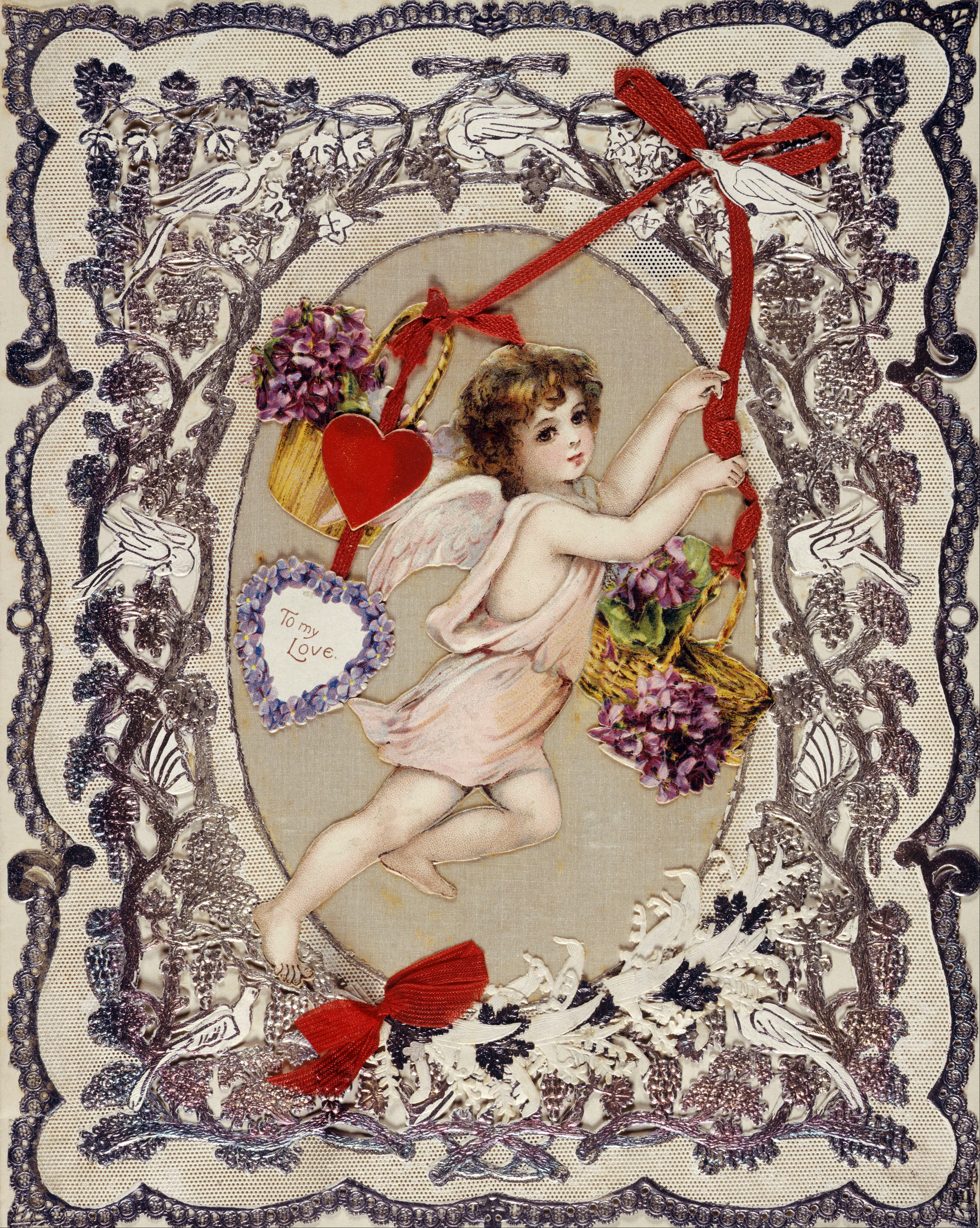
An English Victorian era Valentine card located in the Museum of London

In 1797, a British publisher issued The Young Man's Valentine Writer, which contained scores of suggested sentimental verses for the young lover unable to compose his own. Printers had already begun producing a limited number of cards with verses and sketches, called "mechanical valentines". Paper Valentines became so popular in England in the early 19th century that they were assembled in factories. Fancy Valentines were made with real lace and ribbons, with paper lace introduced in the mid-19th century. In 1835, 60,000 Valentine cards were sent by post in the United Kingdom, despite postage being expensive. Charles Dickens incorporates a Valentine into his first novel The Pickwick Papers (1836) with the Cockney shoeshiner Sam Weller crafting a Valentine to his would-be-lover Mary.

A reduction in postal rates following Sir Rowland Hill's postal reforms with the 1840 invention of the postage stamp (Penny Black) saw the number of Valentines posted increase, with 400,000 sent just one year after its introduction, and ushered in the less personal but easier practice of mailing Valentines. That made it possible for the first time to exchange cards anonymously, which is taken as the reason for the sudden appearance of racy verse in an era otherwise prudishly Victorian. Production increased, "Cupid's Manufactory" as Charles Dickens termed it, with over 3,000 women employed in manufacturing. The Laura Seddon Greeting Card Collection at Manchester Metropolitan University gathers 450 Valentine's Day cards dating from early 19th century Britain, printed by the major publishers of the day. The collection appears in Seddon's book Victorian Valentines (1996).

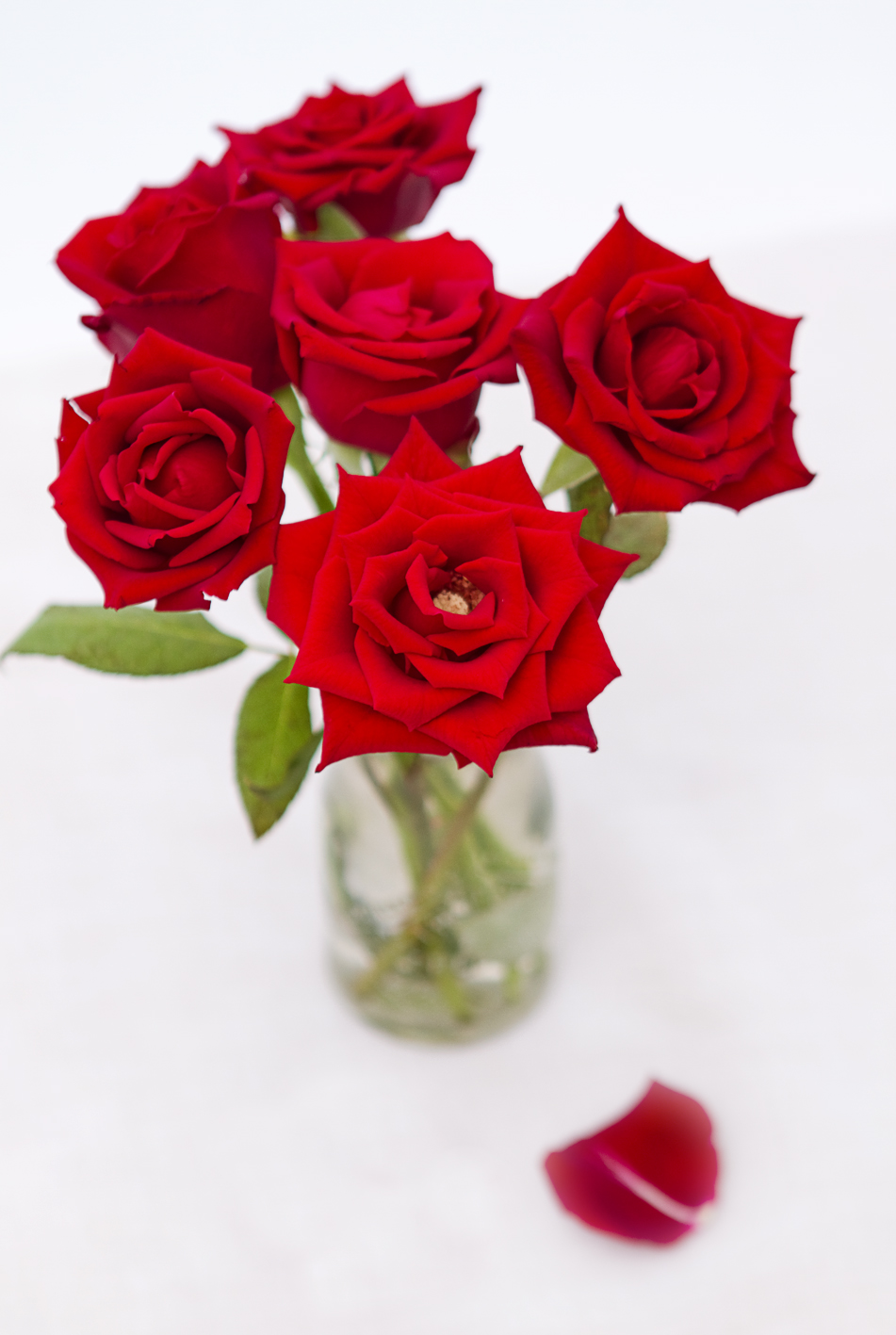
Flowers, such as red roses (pictured), are often sent on Valentine's Day.

In the United States, the first mass-produced Valentines of embossed paper lace were produced and sold shortly after 1847 by Esther Howland (1828–1904) of Worcester, Massachusetts. Her father operated a large book and stationery store, but Howland took her inspiration from an English Valentine she had received from a business associate of her father. Intrigued with the idea of making similar Valentines, Howland began her business by importing paper lace and floral decorations from England.

A writer in Graham's American Monthly observed in 1849, "Saint Valentine's Day ... is becoming, nay it has become, a national holyday." The English practice of sending Valentine's cards was established enough to feature as a plot device in Elizabeth Gaskell's Mr. Harrison's Confessions (1851): "I burst in with my explanations: 'The valentine I know nothing about.' 'It is in your handwriting', said he coldly." Since 2001, the Greeting Card Association has been giving an annual "Esther Howland Award for a Greeting Card Visionary".

Since the 19th century, handmade cards have given way to mass-produced greeting cards. In the UK, just under half of the population spend money on their Valentines, and around £1.9 billion was spent in 2015 on cards, flowers, chocolates, and other gifts. The mid-19th century Valentine's Day trade was a harbinger of further commercialized holidays in the U.S. to follow.

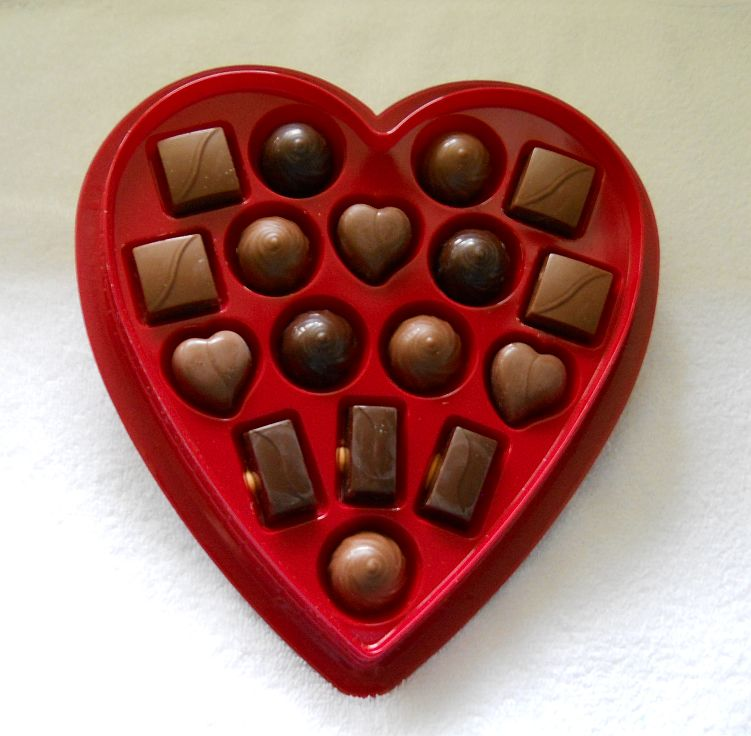
A gift box of chocolates, which is a common gift for Valentine's Day

In 1868, the British chocolate company Cadbury created Fancy Boxes – a decorated box of chocolates – in the shape of a heart for Valentine's Day. Boxes of filled chocolates quickly became associated with the holiday. In the second half of the 20th century, the practice of exchanging cards was extended to all manner of gifts, such as giving jewelry.

The U.S. Greeting Card Association estimates that approximately 190 million valentines are sent each year in the US. Half of those valentines are given to family members other than husband or wife, usually to children. When the valentine-exchange cards made in school activities are included the figure goes up to 1 billion, and teachers become the people receiving the most valentines.

The increase in use of the Internet around the turn of the millennium is creating new traditions. Every year, millions of people use digital means of creating and sending Valentine's Day greeting messages such as e-cards, love coupons and printable greeting cards. Valentine's Day is considered by some to be a Hallmark holiday due to its commercialization.

In 2016, the Catholic Bishops of England and Wales established a novena prayer "to support single people seeking a spouse ahead of St Valentine's Day."

== Celebration and status worldwide ==
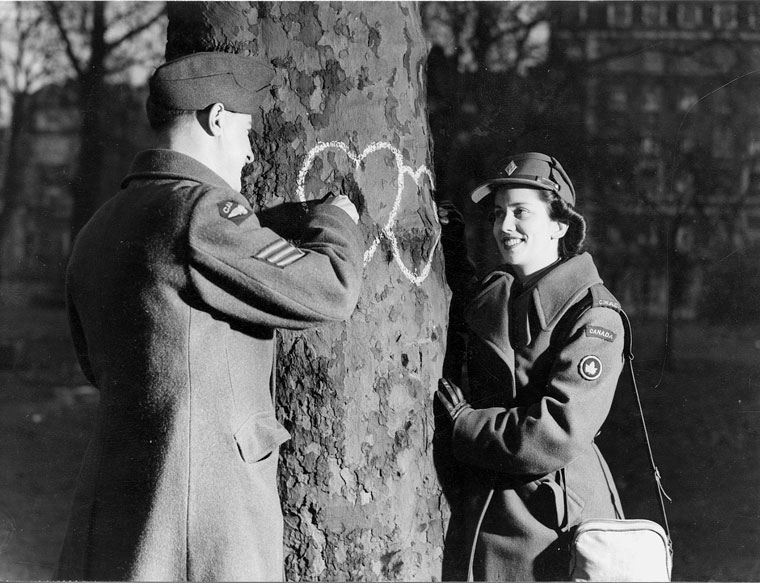
A Canadian Women's Army Corps member and a man in the Canadian Air Force chalk hearts on a tree on Valentine's Day 1944.

Valentine's Day customs—sending greeting cards (known as "valentines"), offering confectionery and presenting flowers—developed in early modern England and spread throughout the English-speaking world in the 19th century. In the later 20th and early 21st centuries, these customs spread to other countries, like those of Halloween, and aspects of Christmas (such as Santa Claus).

Valentine's Day is celebrated in many East Asian countries, with Singaporeans, Chinese, and South Koreans spending the most money on Valentine's gifts.

=== Americas ===
==== Latin America ====
In most Latin American countries—for example, Costa Rica, Mexico, and the U.S. territory of Puerto Rico—Saint Valentine's Day is known as Día de los Enamorados ('Lovers' Day') or as Día del Amor y la Amistad ('Love and Friendship Day'). It is also common to see people perform "acts of appreciation" for their friends.

In Guatemala it is known as Día del Cariño ('Affection Day'). Some countries, in particular the Dominican Republic and El Salvador, have a tradition called Amigo secreto ('secret friend'), which is a game similar to the Christmas tradition of Secret Santa.

==== Brazil ====
In Brazil, the Dia dos Namorados ('Lovers' Day', or 'Boyfriends/Girlfriends Day') is celebrated on June 12, probably because that is the day before Saint Anthony's day—a saint recognized for blessing young couples with happy and prosperous marriages—when traditionally many single women perform popular rituals called simpatias in order to find a good husband or boyfriend. Couples exchange gifts, chocolates, cards, and flower bouquets. The February 14 Valentine's Day is not celebrated at all because it is usually too close to Brazilian Carnival, which can fall anywhere from early February to early March and lasts almost a week.

==== Colombia ====
Colombia celebrates Día del amor y la amistad ('Love and Friendship Day') on the third Saturday in September instead. Amigo Secreto is also popular there.

==== United States ====
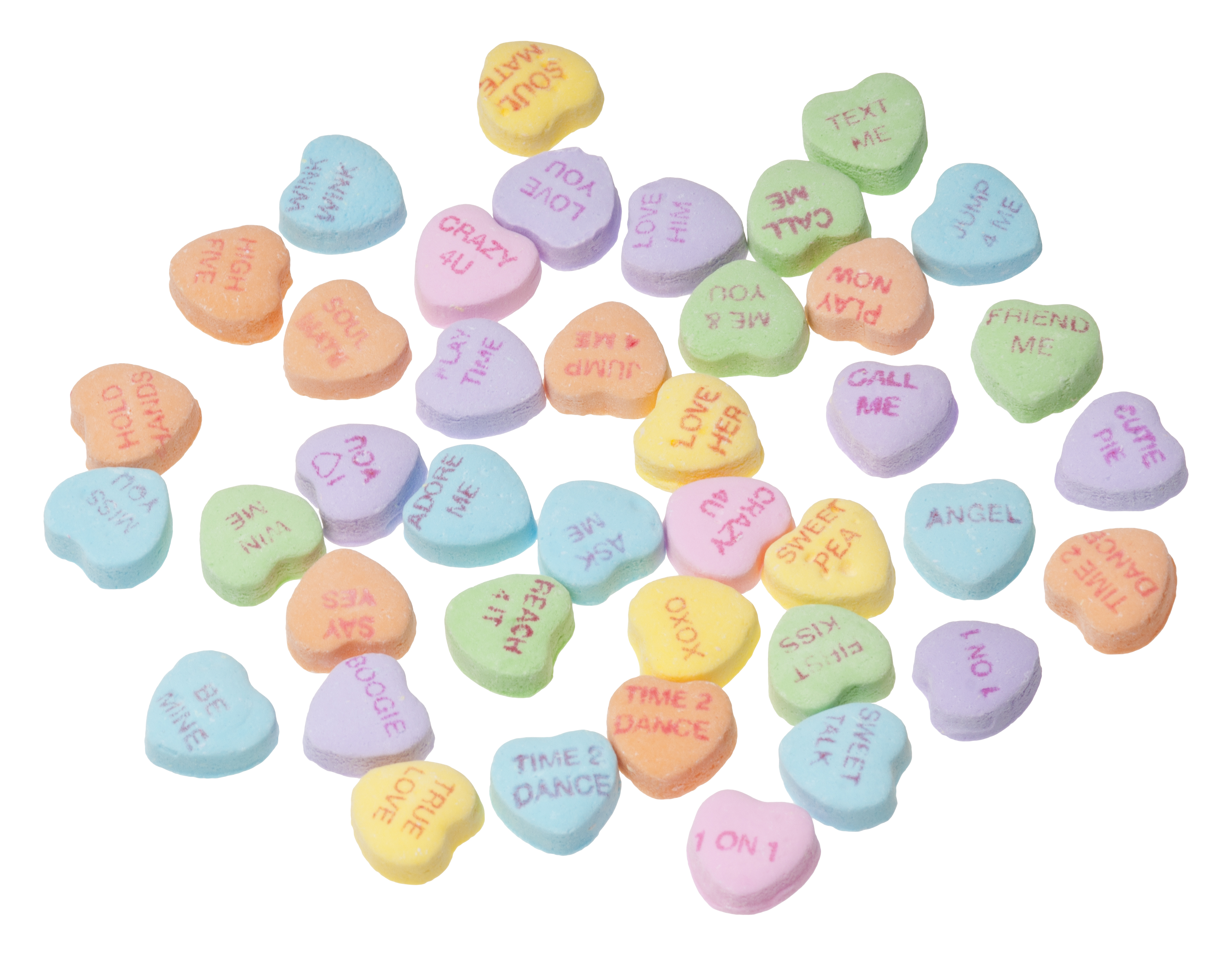
Conversation hearts, candies with messages on them, are strongly associated with Valentine's Day in the United States.

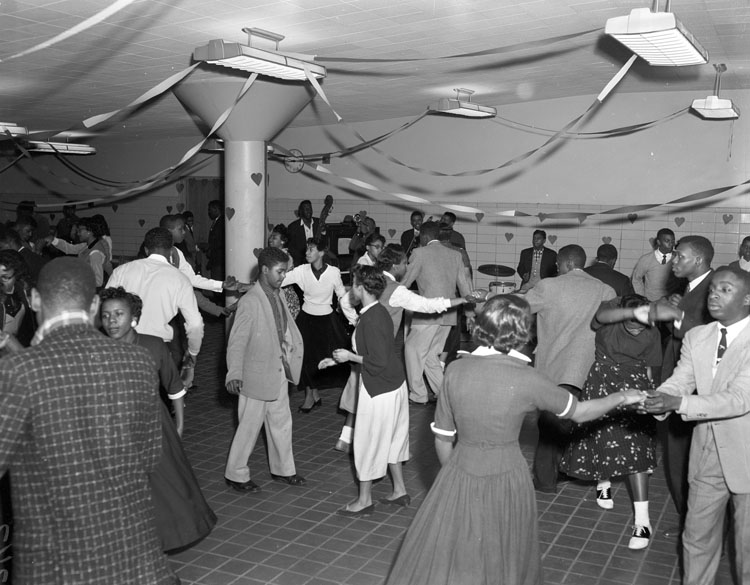
Valentine's Day school dance, Richmond, Virginia 1956

On the United States mainland, about 190 million Valentine's Day cards are sent each year, not including the hundreds of millions of cards school children exchange.

Valentine's Day is a major source of economic activity, with total expenditure topping $18.2 billion in 2017, or over $136 per person. This was an increase from $108 per person in 2010. Purchases include jewellery, flowers, chocolates, candy, and greeting cards. Roses, especially red roses, are the most popular flower. In the US, roses are generally imported via refrigerated airplanes from Colombia and Ecuador. The most popular locally grown and seasonally compatible flowers are early spring tulips.

In 2019, a survey by the National Retail Federation found that over the previous decade, the percentage of people who celebrate Valentine's Day had declined steadily. From their survey results, they found three primary reasons: over-commercialization of the holiday, not having a spouse or significant other to celebrate it with, and not being interested in celebrating it.

=== Asia ===
==== Afghanistan ====
In pre-Taliban years, Koch-e-Gul-Faroushi ('Flower Street') in downtown Kabul used to be adorned with innovative flower arrangements, to attract the Valentine's Day-celebrating youth. In the Afghan tradition, love is often expressed through poetry. A new generation of budding poets such as Ramin Mazhar and Mahtab Sahel express themselves through poetry, using Valentine's Day as a theme to voice concerns about the erosion of freedoms. In one of Mazhar's poems showcasing this topic, he stated "I kiss you amid the Taliban".

==== Bangladesh ====
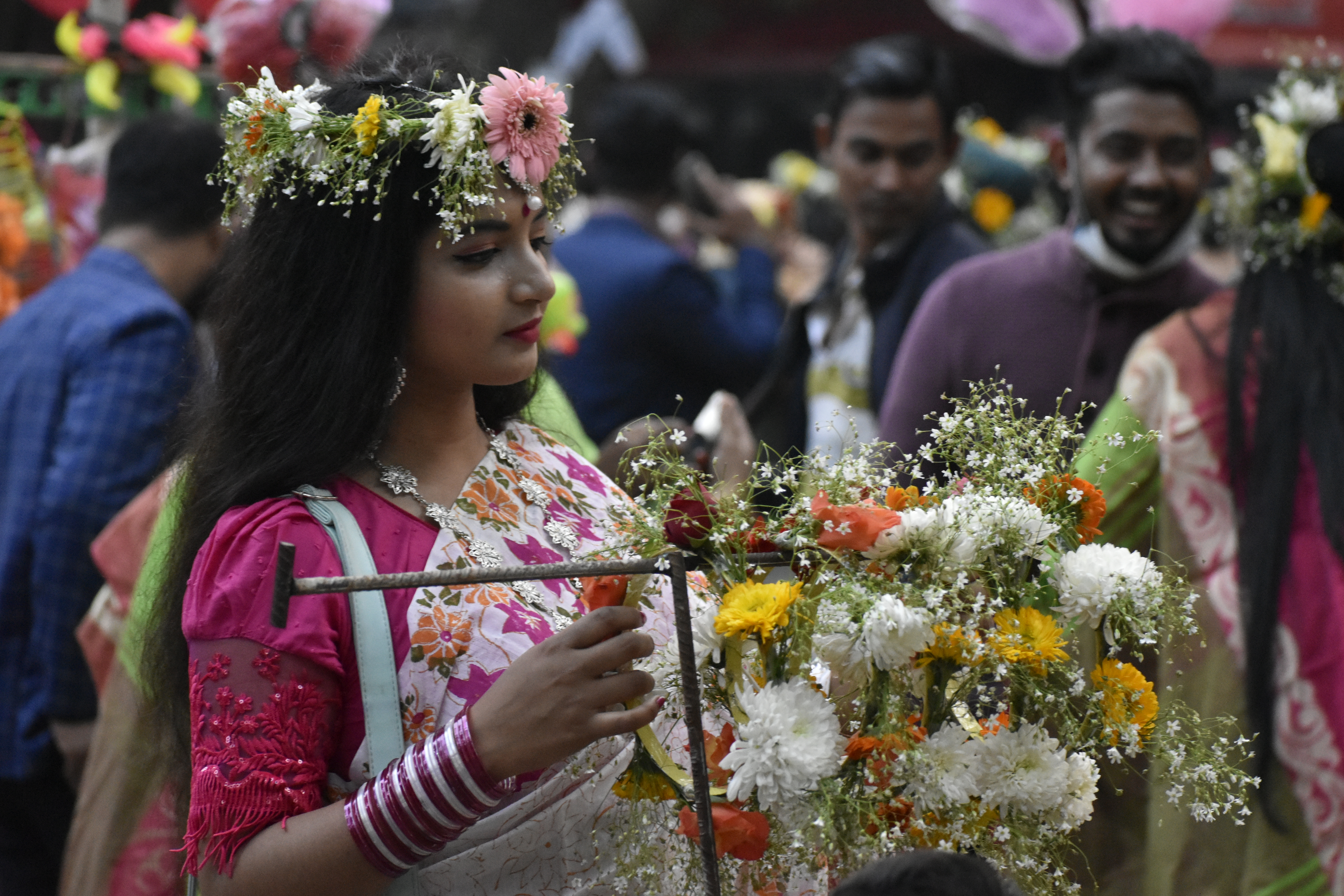
A girl buying flowers in the occasion of Valentine's Day and Pohela Falgun at the University of Dhaka

Valentine's Day was first publicly celebrated in Bangladesh by Shafik Rehman, a journalist and editor of the newspaper Jaijaidin, in 1993. He was acquainted with Western culture from studying in London. He highlighted Valentine's Day to the Bangladeshi people through Jaijaidin, due to which he is called the "father of Valentine's Day in Bangladesh". On this day, people in various types of relationship, including lovers, friends, couples, parents and children, students and teachers, express their love for each other with flowers, chocolates, cards and other gifts. Various parks and recreation centers of the country are full of people. Some in Bangladesh, however, feel that celebrating this day is not acceptable from a cultural and Islamic point of view. No public holiday is declared on this day in Bangladesh.

Before the widespread celebration of Valentine's Day, February 14 was celebrated as the "Authoritarianism Resistance Day" in Bangladesh. However, that day has been largely disregarded due to the popularity of Valentine's Day.

==== China ====
In Chinese, Valentine's Day is called "lovers' festival" (simplified Chinese: 情人节; traditional Chinese: 情人節; Mandarin: Qīng Rén Jié; Hokkien: Chêng Lîn Chiat; Cantonese: Chìhng Yàhn Jit; Shanghainese Xin Yin Jiq). The "Chinese Valentine's Day" is the Qixi Festival (meaning "The Night of Sevens"; Chinese: 七夕; pinyin: Qi Xi), celebrated on the seventh day of the seventh month of the lunar calendar. According to the legend, the Cowherd star and the Weaver Maid star are normally separated by the Milky Way (silvery river) but are allowed to meet by crossing it on the seventh day of the seventh month of the Chinese calendar.

In recent years, celebrating White Day (wherein men who received a gift during Valentine's Day return the favor to the women who gave them the gift) has also become fashionable among some young people.

==== India ====
In ancient India, there was a tradition of adoring Kamadeva, the lord of love – exemplified by the erotic carvings in the Khajuraho Group of Monuments and by the writing of the Kamasutra. This tradition was lost around the Middle Ages, when Kamadeva was no longer celebrated, and public displays of sexual affection became frowned upon. This repression of public affections began to loosen in the 1990s.

Valentine's Day celebrations did not catch on in India until around 1992. It was spread due to the programs in commercial TV channels, such as MTV, dedicated radio programs, and love letter competitions, in addition to an economical liberalization that allowed the explosion of the valentine card industry. The celebration has caused a sharp change on how people have been displaying their affection in public since the Middle Ages.

On a 2018 online survey, it was found that 68% of the respondents did not wish to celebrate Valentine's Day. It can be also observed that different religious groups, including Hindu, Muslim and Christian people of India do not support Valentine's Day.

In modern times, Hindu and Islamic traditionalists have considered the holiday to be cultural contamination from the West, a result of globalization in India. Shiv Sena and the Sangh Parivar have asked their followers to shun the holiday and the "public admission of love" because of them being "alien to Indian culture". Although these protests are organized by political elites, the protesters themselves are middle-class Hindu men who fear that the globalization will destroy the traditions in their society: arranged marriages, Hindu joint families, full-time mothers, etc. Despite these obstacles, Valentine's Day is becoming increasingly popular in India.

Valentine's Day has been strongly criticized from a postcolonial perspective by intellectuals from the Indian left. The holiday is regarded as a front for "Western imperialism", "neocolonialism", and "the exploitation of working classes through commercialism by multinational corporations". It is claimed that as a result of Valentine's Day, the working classes and rural poor become more disconnected socially, politically, and geographically from the hegemonic capitalist power structure. They also criticize mainstream media attacks on Indians opposed to Valentine's Day as a form of demonization that is designed and derived to further the Valentine's Day agenda. Right wing Hindu nationalists are also hostile. In February 2012, Subash Chouhan of the Bajrang Dal warned couples: "They cannot kiss or hug in public places. Our activists will beat them up". He said "We are not against love, but we criticize vulgar exhibition of love at public places".

According to The Hindu in February 2023, the Animal Welfare Board of India appealed to Indians to celebrate February 14 as "Cow Hug Day" for "emotional richness" and to increase "individual and collective happiness." The newspaper referenced the sacredness of cows as being equivalent to one's mother in Indian culture, and further rued: ".. Vedic traditions are almost on the verge of extinction due to the progress of Western culture over time. The dazzle of Western civilization has made our physical culture and heritage almost forgotten".

According to Rhea Mogul of CNN, a 2017 photo series Indian women sporting cow masks by activist Sujatro Ghosh portrays a society in which cows are more valued than women. Mogul says authorities had advanced the idea to rebrand Valentine's Day as "Cow Hug Day". Mogul says, "But the move seems to have failed and later retracted after it prompted a rush of internet memes, cartoons and jokes by TV hosts about the importance of consent." Media outlets like NDTV mocked the government's plan by underlining the importance of the consent of cows before hugging them. Mogul says critics say cow-worship has been politically manipulated by cow vigilante motivated by conservative BJP's majoritarian politics to harass minorities with allegations of disrespect of cows or cow slaughter.

==== Iran ====
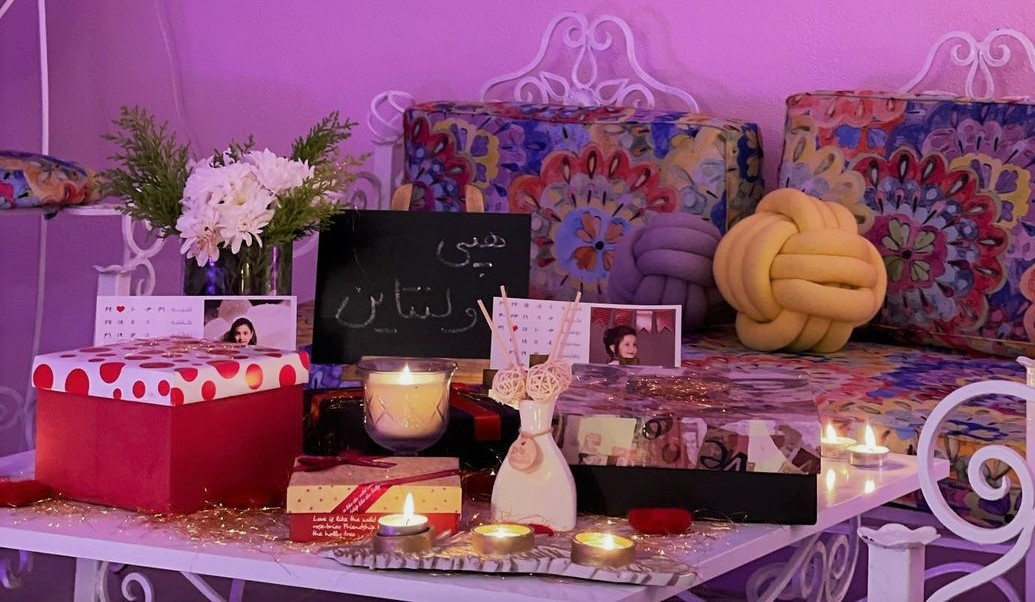
Part of a celebration of Valentine's Day in Tehran

The history of Valentine's Day in Iran dates back to the Qajar era of the latter half of the 19th century. Naser al-Din Shah Qajar did not take his wife with him during his trip to Europe and he sent her a greeting card from distance on Valentine's Day. This greeting card is available in Iranian museums.

Since the mid-2000s, Valentine's Day has become increasingly popular in Iran, especially among young people. However, it has also been the subject of heavy criticism from Iranian Conservatives, who see it as part of the spread of "decadent" Western culture. Since 2011, authorities have attempted to discourage celebrations and impose restrictions on the sale and production of Valentine's Day-related goods, although the holiday remains popular as of 2018. Additionally, there have been efforts to revive the ancient Persian festival of Sepandārmazgān, which takes place around the same time, to replace Valentine's Day. However, as of 2016, this has also been largely unsuccessful. Since 2009, certain practices pertaining to Valentine's Day (such as giving flowers, cards, or other gifts suggestive of Valentine's Day) are banned in Iran. Iran's Law Enforcement Force prosecutes distributors of goods with symbols associated with Valentine's Day. In 2021, the Prosecutor's Office of Qom, Iran, stated that it would prosecute those who disseminate and provide anti-cultural symbols like those of Valentine's Day. Although Valentine's Day is not accepted or approved by any institution in Iran and has no official status, it is highly accepted among a large part of the population. One of the reasons for Valentine's Day acceptance since the 2000s by the general population is the change in relations between the sexes, and because sexual relationships are no longer strictly limited to be within marriage.

==== Israel ====
In Israel, the Jewish tradition of Tu B'Av has been revived and transformed into the Jewish equivalent of Valentine's Day. It is celebrated on the 15th day of the month of Av (usually in late August). In ancient times girls would wear white dresses and dance in the vineyards, where the boys would be waiting for them (Mishna Taanith, end of Chapter 4). Today, Tu B'Av is celebrated as a second holiday of love by secular people (along with Valentine's Day), and it shares many of the customs associated with Saint Valentine's Day in Western societies. In modern Israeli culture Tu B'Av is a popular day to proclaim love, propose marriage, and give gifts like cards or flowers.

==== Japan ====
In Japan, Morozoff Ltd. introduced the holiday for the first time in 1936, when it ran an advertisement aimed at foreigners. Later, in 1953, it began promoting the giving of heart-shaped chocolates; other Japanese confectionery companies followed suit thereafter. In 1958, the Isetan department store ran a "Valentine sale". Further campaigns during the 1960s popularized the custom.

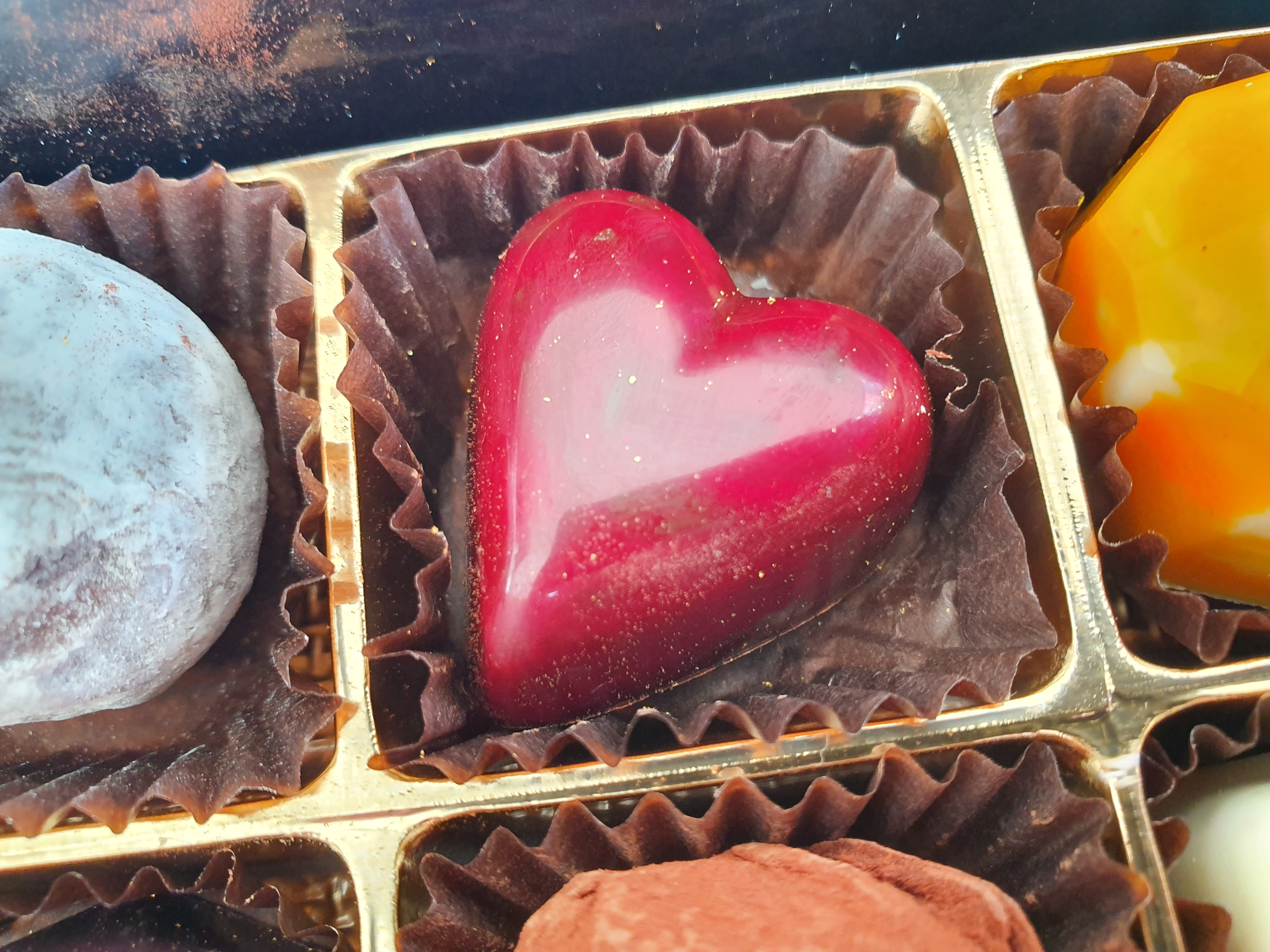
Valentine's chocolates in Japan

The custom that only women give chocolates to men may have originated from the translation error of a chocolate-company executive during the initial campaigns. In particular, office ladies give chocolate to their co-workers. Unlike western countries, gifts such as greeting cards, candies, flowers, or dinner dates are uncommon, and most of the gifts-related activity is about giving the right amount of chocolate to each person. Japanese chocolate companies make half their annual sales during this time of the year.

Many women feel obliged to give chocolates to all male co-workers, except when the day falls on a Sunday, a holiday. This is known as giri-choko (義理チョコ), from giri ('obligation') and choko, ('chocolate'), with unpopular co-workers receiving only "ultra-obligatory" (超義理チョコ, chō-giri choko) cheap chocolate. This contrasts with honmei-choko (本命チョコ, lit. "true feeling chocolate"), chocolate given to a loved one. Friends, especially girls, may exchange chocolate referred to as tomo-choko (友チョコ, from 'tomo' meaning "friend").

In the 1980s, the Japanese National Confectionery Industry Association launched a successful campaign to make March 14 a "reply day", on which men are expected to return the favour to those who gave them chocolates on Valentine's Day, calling it White Day for the color of the chocolates being offered. A previous failed attempt to popularize this celebration had been done by a marshmallow manufacturer who wanted men to return marshmallows to women.

In Japan, the romantic "date night" associated with Valentine's Day is celebrated on Christmas Eve.

==== Malaysia ====
Islamic officials in West Malaysia warned Muslims against celebrating Valentine's Day, linking it with vice activities. Deputy Prime Minister Muhyiddin Yassin said the celebration of romantic love was "not suitable" for Muslims. Wan Mohamad Sheikh Abdul Aziz, head of the Malaysian Islamic Development Department (Jakim), which oversees the country's Islamic policies said that a fatwa (ruling) issued by the country's top clerics in 2005 noted that the day "is associated with elements of Christianity," and "we just cannot get involved with other religions' worshipping rituals." Jakim officials planned to carry out a nationwide campaign called "Awas Jerat Valentine's Day" ("Mind the Valentine's Day Trap"), aimed at preventing Muslims from celebrating the day on February 14, 2011. Activities included conducting raids in hotels to stop young couples from having unlawful sex and distributing leaflets to Muslim university students warning them against the day.

On Valentine's Day 2011, West Malaysian religious authorities arrested more than 100 Muslim couples concerning the celebration ban. Some of them would be charged in the Shariah Court for defying the department's ban against the celebration of Valentine's Day.

In East Malaysia, the celebrations are much more tolerated among young Muslim couples, although some Islamic officials and Muslim activists from the West side have told younger generations to refrain from such celebration by organising da'wah and tried to spread their ban into the East. In both the states of Sabah and Sarawak, the celebration is usually common with flowers.

==== Pakistan ====
The concept of Valentine's Day was introduced into Pakistan during the late 1990s with special TV and radio programs. The Jamaat-e-Islami political party has called for the banning of Valentine's Day celebration. Despite this, the celebration is becoming popular among urban youth and the florists expect to sell a great number of flowers, especially red roses. The case is the same with card publishers.

In 2016, the local governing body of Peshwar officially banned the celebration of Valentine's Day in the city. The ban was also implemented in other cities such as Kohat by the local governments.

In 2017, the Islamabad High Court banned Valentine's Day celebrations in public places in Pakistan. More than 80% of Dawn readers polled on its website agreed with this decision.

In 2018, because of a petition by a citizen, Abdul Waheed, the Pakistan Electronic Media Regulatory Authority advised broadcasters and newspapers against airing any Valentine's Day celebrations.

==== Philippines ====
In the Philippines, Valentine's Day is called Araw ng mga Puso in much the same manner as in the West. It is usually marked by a steep increase in the price of flowers, particularly red roses. It is the most popular day for weddings, with some localities offering mass ceremonies for no charge.

==== Saudi Arabia ====
In Saudi Arabia, in 2002 and 2008, religious police banned the sale of all Valentine's Day items, telling shop workers to remove any red items, because the day is considered a Christian holiday. This ban has created a black market for roses and wrapping paper. In 2012, the religious police arrested more than 140 Muslims for celebrating the holiday, and confiscated all red roses from flower shops. Muslims are not allowed to celebrate the holiday, and non-Muslims can celebrate only behind closed doors.

"Saudi cleric Sheikh Muhammad Al-'Arifi said on Valentine's Day Eve that celebrating this holiday constitutes bid'a – a forbidden innovation and deviation from religious law and custom – and mimicry of the West."

However, in 2017 and 2018, after a fatwa was widely circulated, the religious police did not prevent Muslims from celebrating the day. In 2018, Sheikh Ahmed Qasim Al-Ghamdi, a Saudi cleric and former president of the Committee for the Promotion of Virtue and Prevention of Vice, said that Valentine's Day is not haram and is compatible with Islamic values.

==== Singapore ====
According to findings, Singaporeans are among the biggest spenders on Valentine's Day, with 60% of Singaporeans indicating that they would spend between $100 and $500 during the season leading up to the holiday.

==== South Korea ====
In South Korea, women give chocolate to men on February 14, and men give non-chocolate candy to women on March 14 (White Day). On April 14 (Black Day), those who did not receive anything on February or March 14 go to a Chinese-Korean restaurant to eat black noodles (짜장면; jajangmyeon) and lament their "single life". Koreans also celebrate Pepero Day on November 11, when young couples give each other pepero cookies. The date "11/11" is intended to resemble the long shape of the cookie. The 14th of every month marks a love-related day in Korea, although most of them are obscure. From January to December, the sequence of these days is Candle Day, Valentine's Day, White Day, Black Day, Rose Day, Kiss Day, Silver Day, Green Day, Music Day, Wine Day, Movie Day, and Hug Day. Korean women give a much higher amount of chocolate than Japanese women.

==== Taiwan ====
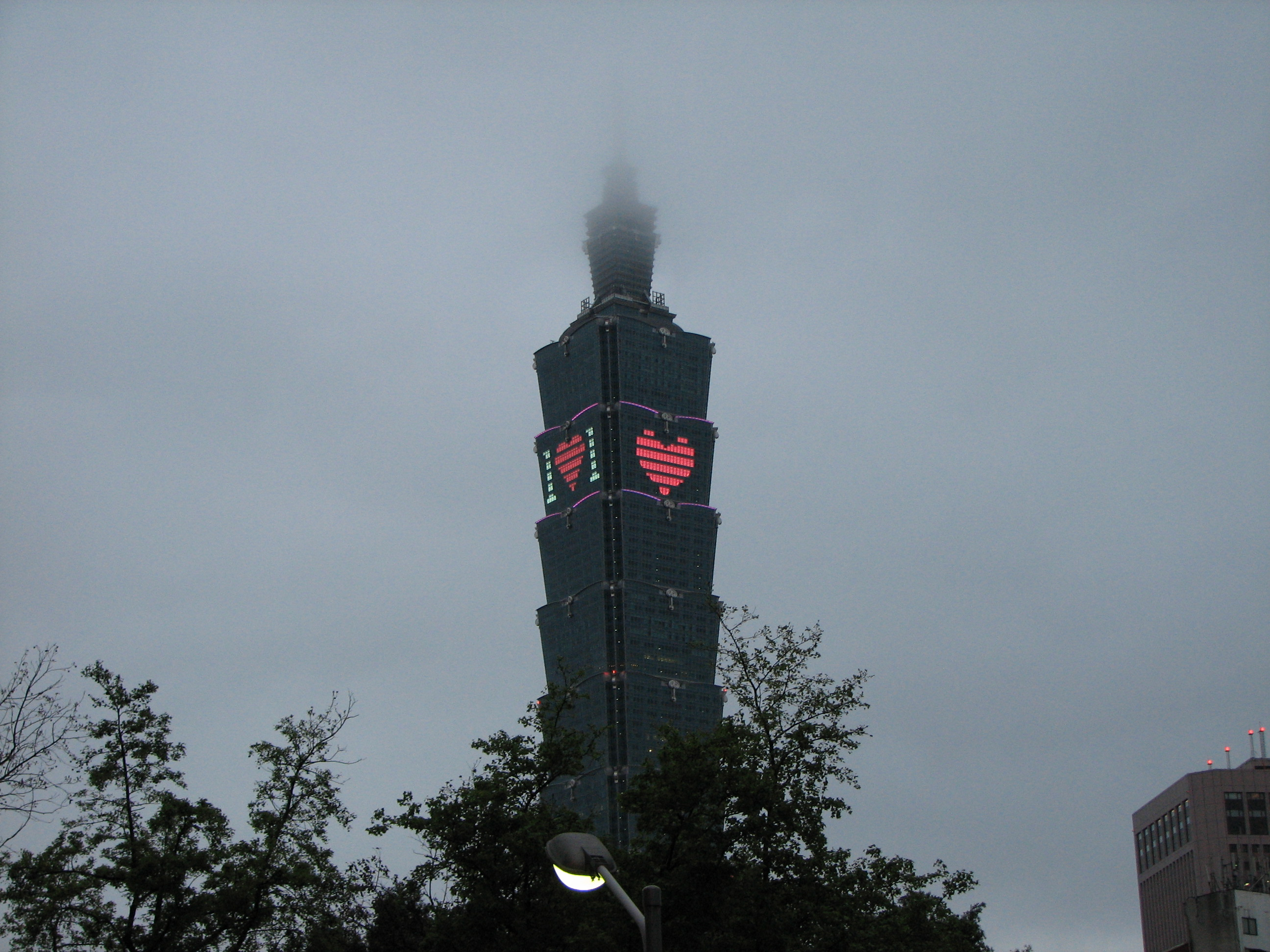
Taipei 101 in Valentine's Day 2006

In Taiwan, traditional Qixi Festival, Valentine's Day and White Day are all celebrated. However, the situation is the reverse of Japan's. Men give gifts to women on Valentine's Day, and women return them on White Day.

=== Europe ===
==== Estonia and Finland ====
In Finland, Valentine's Day is called ystävänpäivä ('Friend's Day'). As the name indicates, this day is more about remembering friends, not significant others. In Estonia, Valentine's Day was originally called valentinipäev and later also sõbrapäev ('Friend's Day') as a calque of the Finnish term.

==== France ====
In France, a traditionally Catholic country, Valentine's Day is known simply as "Saint Valentin", and is celebrated in much the same way as other Western countries. The relics of Saint Valentin de Terni, the patron of the St Valentine's Day, are in the Catholic church of Saint-Jean-Baptiste and Saint-Jean-l’Evangéliste, located in the southern France town of Roquemaure, Gard. The celebrations of "Fête des Amoureux" takes place every two years on the Sunday closest to February 14. The village gets dressed in its 19th-century costume and put on the program with over 800 people.

==== Greece ====
Saint Valentine's Day, or Ημέρα του Αγίου Βαλεντίνου in Greek tradition, was not associated with romantic love. In the Eastern Orthodox church there is another saint who protects people who are in love, Hyacinth of Caesarea (feast day July 3); but this was not widely known until the late 1990s. In contemporary Greece, Valentine's Day is generally celebrated as in the common western tradition.

==== Ireland ====
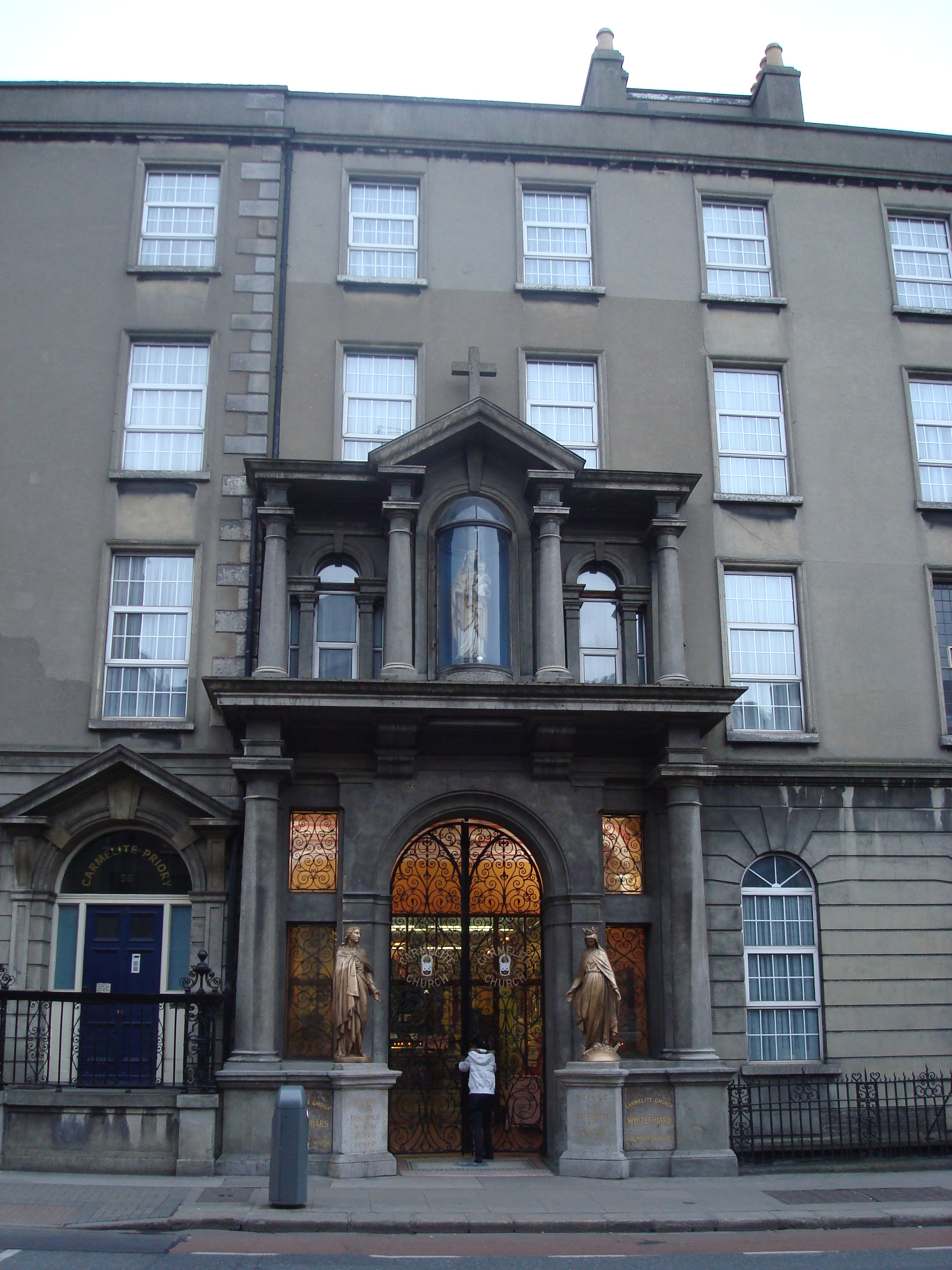
Many Christians make a pilgrimage to Whitefriar Street Carmelite Church in Dublin on Saint Valentine's Day to implore the intercession of Saint Valentine in their prayers, with the hope of finding true love.

On Saint Valentine's Day in Ireland, many individuals who seek true love make a Christian pilgrimage to the Shrine of St. Valentine in Whitefriar Street Carmelite Church in Dublin, which is said to house relics of Saint Valentine of Rome; they pray at the shrine in hope of finding romance. There lies a book in which foreigners and locals have written their prayer requests for love.

==== Poland ====
Saint Valentine's Day was introduced to Poland together with the cult of Saint Valentine via Bavaria and Tyrol. However, it rose in popularity in the 1990s. The only public celebration in Poland is held annually from 2002 in Chełmno under the name "Walentynki Chełmińskie" (Chełmno Valentine's). Because Chełmno's parish church of the Assumption of the Blessed Virgin Mary has been holding the relic of Saint Valentine since the Middle Ages, local cult of the saint has been combined with the Anglo-Saxon tradition.

==== Portugal ====
In Portugal, the holiday is known as "Dia dos Namorados" (Lovers' Day / Day of the Enamoured). As elsewhere, couples exchange gifts, but in some regions, women give a lenço de namorados ("lovers' handkerchief"), which is usually embroidered with love motifs.

==== Romania ====
In recent years, Romania has also started celebrating Valentine's Day. This has drawn backlash from several groups, institutions, and nationalist organizations like Noua Dreaptă, who condemn Valentine's Day for being superficial, commercialist, and imported Western kitsch. In order to counter the perceived denaturation of national culture, Dragobete, a spring festival celebrated in parts of Southern Romania, has been rekindled after having been ignored during the Communist years as the traditional Romanian holiday for lovers. The holiday is named after a character from Romanian folklore who was supposed to be the son of Baba Dochia. Its date used to vary depending on the geographical area, however nowadays it is commonly observed on February 24.

==== Scandinavia ====
In Denmark and Norway, February 14 is known as Valentinsdag, and is celebrated in much the same manner as in the United Kingdom. In Sweden it is called Alla hjärtans dag ("All Hearts' Day") but is not widely celebrated. A 2016 survey revealed that fewer than 50% of men and women were planning to buy presents for their partners. The holiday has only been observed since the 1960s.

==== Spain ====
The holiday was first introduced in Spain through a 1948 advertisement campaign by the department store chain Galerías Preciados, and had become widespread by the 1970s.

Known as "San Valentín", the holiday is celebrated the same way as in the rest of the West. However, in Catalonia, the celebration is overshadowed by the highly popular Saint George's Day (Catalan: Diada de Sant Jordi), a Catalan tradition established in the late Middle Ages which already serves to the same romantic purpose of Valentine's Day.

==== United Kingdom ====
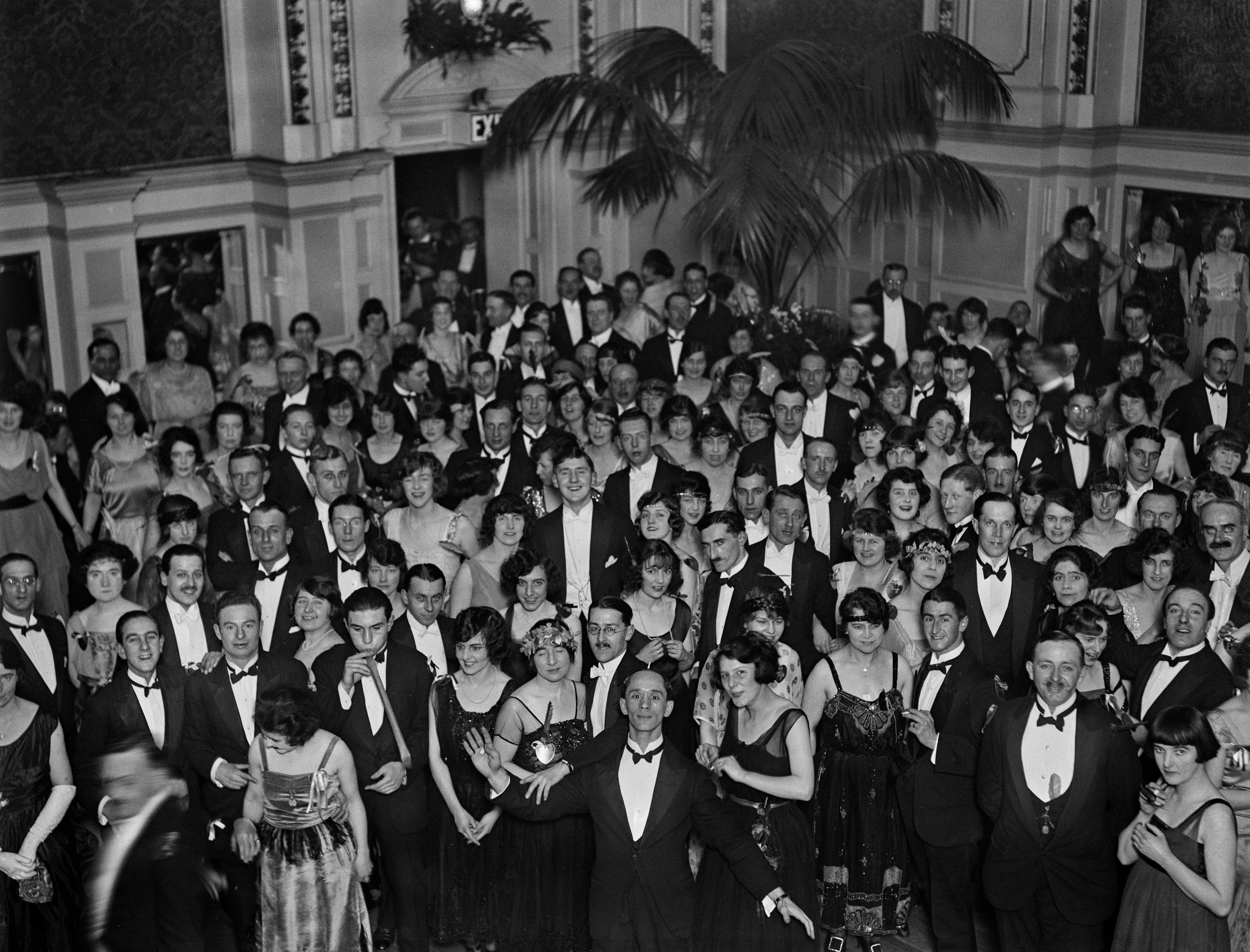
Valentine's dance and ballroom dancing competition at the Royal Palace Hotel in Kensington, London, Valentine's Day 1921

In the UK, just under half of the population spends money on their valentines. Around £1.3 billion is spent yearly on cards, flowers, chocolates, and other gifts, with an estimated 25 million cards sent.

In Wales, some people celebrate Dydd Santes Dwynwen (Saint Dwynwen's Day) on January 25 instead of (or as well as) Valentine's Day. The day commemorates St Dwynwen, the Welsh patron saint of love. The Welsh name for Saint Valentine is Sant Ffolant.

In a 2016 poll conducted by Channel 4 for Valentine's Day, Jane Austen's line, "My heart is, and always will be, yours", from her novel Sense and Sensibility as said by Edward Ferrars (Hugh Grant) to Elinor Dashwood (Emma Thompson) in the acclaimed 1995 film adaptation, was voted the most romantic line from literature, film, and TV by thousands of women.

== Restrictions on Valentine's Day in some countries ==
Valentine's Day has also faced restrictions or official discouragement in several other countries. In Indonesia and Uzbekistan, authorities in some regions have discouraged or limited celebrations due to concerns about Western cultural influence and religious values. In Brunei, officials have warned Muslims against celebrating the holiday, though non-Muslims may observe it privately. In Qatar, Kuwait and Oman, celebrations are generally low-key or private because of cultural and religious sensitivities. In Somalia, the holiday has been opposed or banned in some areas by religious authorities who consider it contrary to Islamic teachings.

== See also ==
- Galentine's Day
- Palentine's Day
- World Kiss Day
- Dia dos Namorados
- Sailor's valentine
- Saint Valentine's Day Massacre
- Singles Awareness Day
- Steak and Blowjob Day
- Valentine's Day (2010 film)
- V-Day, the global movement to end violence against women and girls.
- Women's Memorial March, held on Valentine's Day in Vancouver, British Columbia.
- Cake and Cunnilingus Day
- National Boyfriend Day
