= National Boyfriend Day =

Unofficial October observance

- Observed by: Primarily United States; now globally
- Type: Informal / Social media holiday
- Significance: Day dedicated to boyfriends
- Date: October 3
- Frequency: Annual

National Boyfriend Day is an unofficial event celebrated annually on October 3 in many countries. It is a day dedicated to boyfriends and appreciating their role in relationships.

The event gained popularity in the 2010s largely from social media platforms.

== History ==
National Boyfriend Day, formerly known as Boyfriend's Day, is thought to have originated around October 4, 2014, but it only gained widespread popularity in March 2016, when there was a significant boost of over 46,000 tweets celebrating the day.

== See also ==
- Valentine's Day
- Singles Awareness Day
