= Palentine's Day =

Annual holiday observed on February 13

- Significance: The celebration of platonic love
- Observances: Expressing gratitude to and spending time with friends
- Date: February 13
- Frequency: Annual

Palentine's Day is a global holiday celebrating friendships and every other form of platonic love. It is celebrated annually on February 13, but can be observed on February 14 as well, and complements Valentine's Day, which celebrates romantic love.

== Etymology and origin ==
The term Palentine originates from the combination of the words "pal", which is another word for friend, and "valentine". Palentine's Day emerged as a gender-neutral version of Galentine's Day, which focuses on women's friendships.

In 2020, the online dating service Plenty of Fish published an online survey of 2,000 singles pointing out four personalities around Valentine’s Day, one of whom are Palentines, who celebrate friendship and Palentine’s Day rather than romance and Valentine's Day. The specific benefits for singles, for whom Valentine’s Day can be associated with mourning and feelings of misery, are increasingly recognised and the need for a reinvention of Valentine's Day is acknowledged. In addition, a growing amount of attention is being paid to the benefits for those excluded from Galentine's Day, like men and non-binary people. In 2023, a study of viewers' perceptions of the portrayal of single fathers in the TV series Single Parents concluded that viewers responded overwhelmingly positive, praising two of the main male characters for celebrating Palentine's Day together, which "suggests a shift in norms around masculinity". Megan Carroll, an assistant professor at California State University, pointed out the importance of Palentine's Day for asexual and aromantic people, "and others who don’t live up to what she says are society’s ideals of romance and sex". Friendships have a great influence even beyond private life, for example on employee retention and job satisfaction, as recognised in a small survey published by the Society for Human Resource Management highlighting “the power of friendship in the workplace” in a 2023 Palentine’s Day infographic.

== Discussion ==
In light of the benefits of friendships and the importance to celebrate them, Palentine's Day is recognized, discussed, and publicly celebrated by a variety of players including bookstores, libraries, hotels, movie theaters, restaurants, academic institutions, books, and TV series. Several TV series even feature episodes titled “Palentine's Day” and Palentine's Day is beginning to be established as a marketing tool. The focus group approach in a 2022 study examining LGBTQ2S evaluation with youth benefited from improved marketing by being reframed as Palentine's Day focus group.

== Activities ==
There is a wide range of activities to celebrate Palentine's Day with one or more friends, including media marathons, hiking, or karaoke. The main focus is on spending quality time with one's platonic loved ones and on letting "those around you know how much you appreciate them and that you are thankful they are in your life." In 2022, a comment in The Herald emphasised that our stories of platonic friendships are love stories and deserve to be celebrated, and that Palentine's Day is an opportunity to do so.
