= Boyfriend =

Regular male companion in a platonic, romantic or sexual relationship

A boyfriend is a man who is a friend or acquaintance to the speaker, often specifying a regular male companion with whom a person is platonically, romantically or sexually involved.

A boyfriend can also be called an admirer, beau, suitor and sweetheart. The analogous term for women is "girlfriend", and analogous terms that are gender-neutral include "partner" for sexual relationships, or "friend" for friendships.

== Scope ==
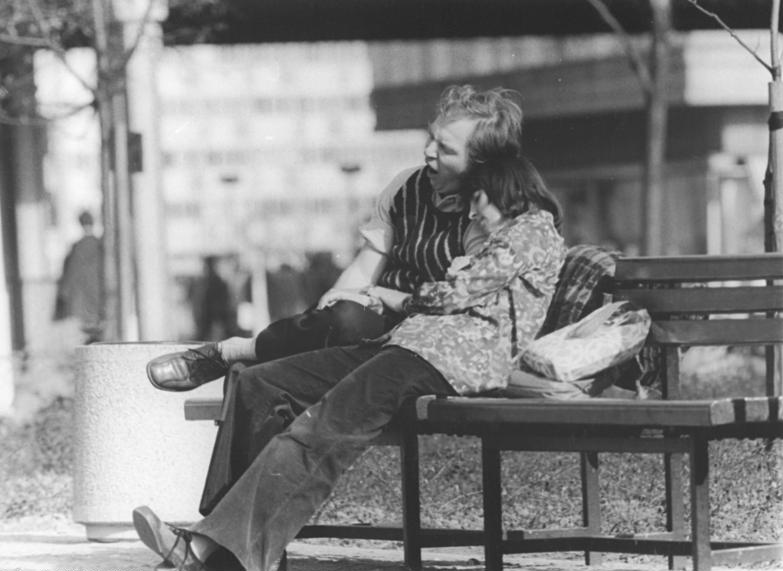
A woman with her boyfriend at Alexanderplatz in March 1975

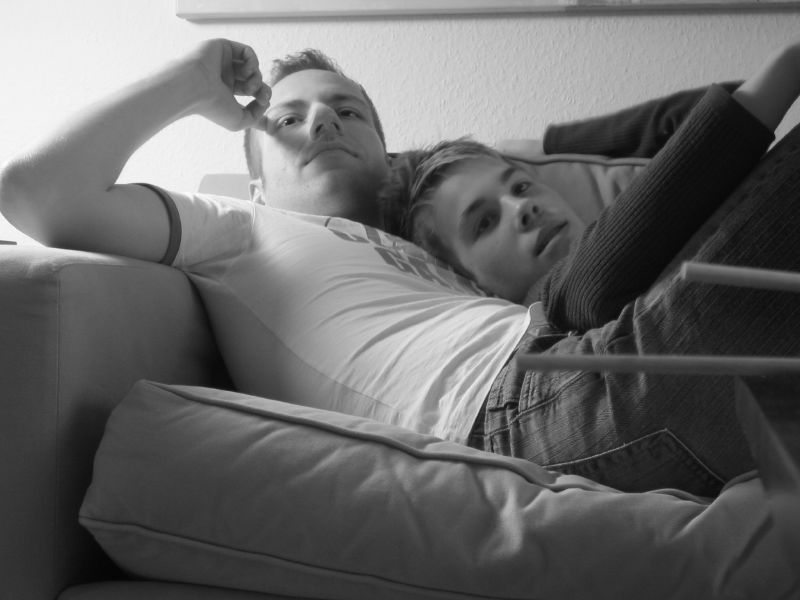
A man with his boyfriend

Partners in committed non-marital relationships are also sometimes described as a significant other or partner, especially if the individuals are cohabiting.

A 2005 study of 115 people ages 21 to 35 who were either living with or had lived with a romantic partner notes that the lack of proper terms often leads to awkward situations, such as someone upset over not being introduced in social situations to avoid the question.

== Word history ==
The word dating entered American English during the Roaring Twenties. Prior to that, courtship was a matter of family and community interest. Starting around the time of the American Civil War, courtship became a private matter for couples. In the early- to mid-19th century United States, women often had "gentleman callers", single men who would visit the home of a young woman with the hopes of beginning a courtship. The era of the gentleman caller ended in the early 20th century and the modern idea of dating developed.

In literature, the term is discussed in July 1988 in Neil Bartlett's Who Was That Man? A Present for Mr Oscar Wilde. On pages 108–110, Bartlett quotes from an issue of The Artist and Journal of Home Culture, which refers to Alectryon as "a boyfriend of Mars".

== Synonyms ==
- An older man may be referred to as a sugar daddy, a well-to-do man who financially supports or lavishly spends on a mistress, girlfriend, or boyfriend.
- In popular culture, slang, internet chat, and cellphone texting, the truncated acronym bf is also used.
- Leman, an archaic word for "sweetheart, paramour," from Medieval British leofman (c.1205), from Old English leof (cognate of Dutch lief, German lieb) "dear" + man "human being, person" was originally applied to either gender, but usually means mistress.
- The term young man was at some periods used with a similar connotation. For example, in the 1945 film My Name Is Julia Ross the female protagonist, seeking a secretarial job, is asked if she has "a young man" – where in later films a similar question would have referred to "a boyfriend".

== See also ==
- Domestic partnership
- National Boyfriend Day
