= Dia dos Namorados =

National holiday in Brazil

Liza Sapova in a Dia dos Namorados photo shoot

Dia dos Namorados (Brazilian Portuguese: [ˈdʒiɐ duz namoˈɾadus], Lovers' Day) is a special date celebrated on June 12 in Brazil, usually with gifts, romantic activities, decorations and festivities.

The 12th day of June was chosen because it foregoes the day of Saint Anthony, who is traditionally associated with love, lovers and marriage in that country's predominantly Catholic culture. The term "Dia dos Namorados" is also used in other Portuguese-speaking countries to refer to Valentine's Day.

== Background ==
Anthony of Padua, venerated as Saint Anthony, died on June 13, 1231, in Padua, Italy. In addition to having been canonized as a saint by the Catholic Church, Anthony of Padua is symbolically and reverently recognized as a general of the Brazilian Army, though not a patron thereof. In Brazil, Lovers' Day is celebrated on June 12, which is Saint Anthony's Eve. The saint is said to bless young couples' marriages with joy and prosperity. Celebrations for the day in Brazil are similar to those for Valentine's Day in most other countries: typically, couples exchange romantic gifts, such as chocolates or flowers, and they may also participate in a nightly date; in addition, beautifying home decorations is also common. The day is festive, with colorful street decorations, and sometimes parades and carnivals. Common folk-musical celebrations include samba and live rock concerts, among others. In the years 2011, 2012 and 2017, Google celebrated the date with doodles.

Dia dos Namorados as a celebration for lovers is closely related to observances of Saint Anthony's Day. Although said day is celebrated in some countries on January 17 in association with Anthony the Great, Saint Anthony (of Padua)'s Eve, also known simply as Saint Anthony's Day, is a day of religious observance for many in Brazil and Portugal. Single women traditionally perform folk rituals, called simpatias (lit. 'sympathies', i.e., "meant to obtain the sympathy of the saint"), in order to find a good husband or boyfriend. In addition to prayer on the Eve, one might conceal a love letter in a pot of basil to pass to a prospective suitor.

February 14's Valentine's Day is not celebrated in Brazil at all because it usually falls close to the Carnival, which is celebrated in most other countries annually during the four days before Ash Wednesday, falling between February 4 and March 10 depending on the year.

In other Portuguese-speaking countries, Valentine's Day is also referred to as Dia dos Namorados, but is celebrated on February 14.
