= Galentine's Day (observance) =

Holiday celebrating women's friendship

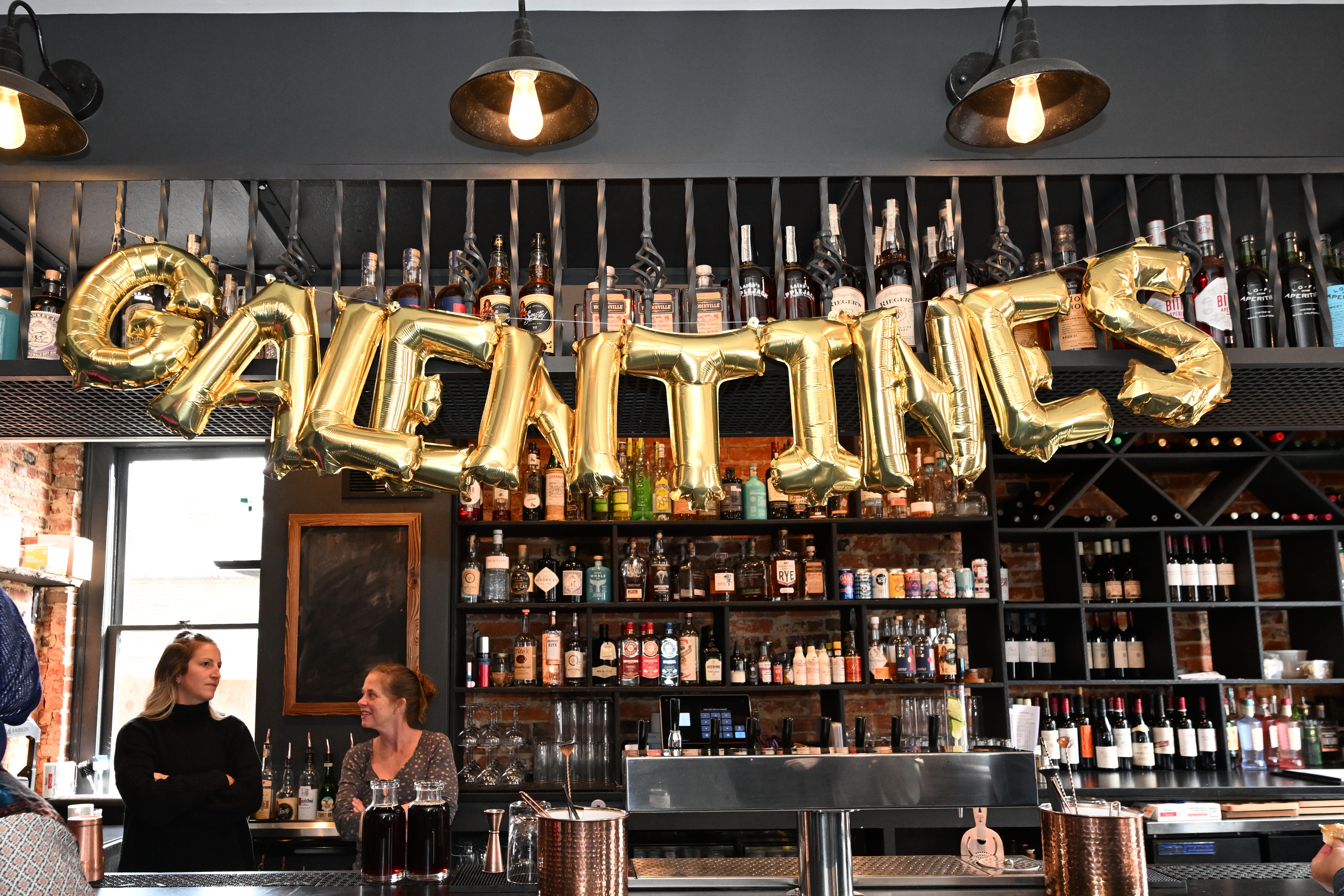
- A Galentine's Day luncheon in Maryland in 2024
- Type: Cultural
- Significance: Celebrating women's friendships
- Date: 13 February (traditionally)
- Frequency: Annual
- Started by: Parks and Recreation

Galentine's Day is an American cultural holiday that celebrates women's friendship. Galentine's Day is typically marked as February 13, but can be observed any day. Galentine's Day events are typically all-female occasions of mutual "empowerment...a reminder for women to support and uplift one another." Galentine's is a portmanteau of the words gal (a variation of the word girl) and Valentine's.

== Origin ==
Galentine's Day originated from the NBC sitcom Parks and Recreation, where the sitcom's main character Leslie Knope (played by Amy Poehler) states that it's a holiday for "ladies celebrating ladies." The holiday made its first appearance in the show's second season episode "Galentine's Day", written by Michael Schur.

== Observance ==
Since the episode first aired in 2010, the once-fictional holiday has increasingly found itself in the mainstream. The occasion is well known enough that Galentine's Day merchandise is now sold at mainstream outlets like Target, Walmart, Party City, Amazon, and Etsy. Retailers also use the holiday as a pretext for organizing pop-up shops marketing products to female customers. Many resorts and restaurants offer Galentine's themed package deals.

Michelle Obama, along with numerous celebrities, posted a photo on her Instagram and Twitter celebrating Galentine's Day in 2020. The caption read,

This #GalentinesDay, I want to shout out my girlfriends who help me stay sane and grounded through all of life's ups and downs...Whether we're catching up over the phone, venting over a cup of coffee, or laughing it out during an 80s-themed workout, I know I can lean on these ladies—and that's made all the difference.

The official Parks & Recreation Twitter account replied with a GIF of Leslie Knope expressing approval.

Since 2023, Massachusetts Senate President Karen Spilka has hosted an annual Galentine's Day celebration for the state's most powerful women. Previous attendees have included Poehler, Maura Healey, Ayanna Pressley, and Anne Klibanski.

== See also ==
- Homosociality
- Palentine's Day
- Womance
