= Schwarzwälder Bote =

German regional daily newspaper

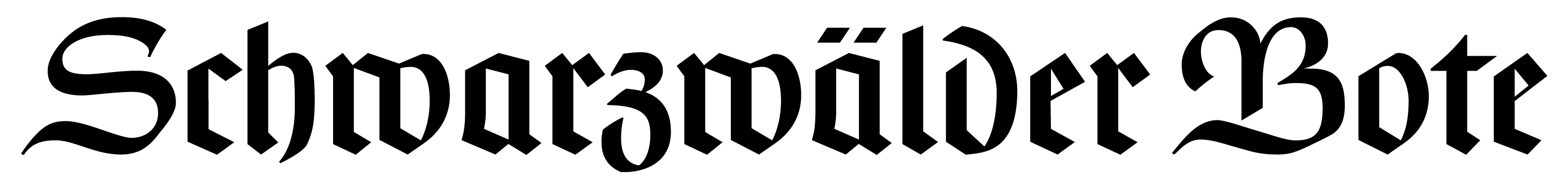
- Logo
- Type: Daily newspaper
- Founded: 1835
- Website: www.schwarzwaelder-bote.de

Schwarzwälder Bote is a German regional daily newspaper for the Black Forest and Upper Neckar region.

Schwarzwälder Bote operates a network of 9 branches and 11 local editorial offices. The main circulation area, including the partner brands Oberbadische Zeitung and Lahrer Zeitung, extends from Calw and Bad Herrenalb in the north to Lörrach in the south, from Lahr in the west to Balingen and Albstadt in the East. The sold circulation is 105,265 copies, a decrease of 23.9 percent since 1998.

Since 2001 the national and international content is received from Stuttgarter Nachrichten.

== History ==
The Schwarzwälder Bote was founded in Sulz am Neckar in 1835. In the same year, Wilhelm Brandecker from Oberndorf acquired the company. He published the Schwarzwälder Bote as an “official and intelligentsia newspaper” and ran the company together with his wife Amalie until 1884. In 1837 the publishing house was moved to Oberndorf am Neckar. To expand the distribution area, Brandecker sent a “Black Forest messenger” in person from city to city in 1842. He distributed the newspaper: in 1844 5,000 copies were already published.

In Nazi Germany the Schwarzwälder Bote was not banned but cooperated with other newspapers. In 1945 the brand was changed to Schwarzwälder Post and in 1949 back to Schwarzwälder Bote.

The traditional printing manufacturing of the newspaper was at the head editorial office in Oberndorf. Since 2003 the newspaper has been printed in the Southwest Printing Center in Villingen.

In 2011 there was a historic strike at the regional newspaper. In order to prevent the collective agreements from being abolished, the editors of the Schwäbsichen Zeitung went on strike for 96 days. It was the longest journalists' strike in post-war German history. The strike was successful and became known nationwide.

CEO and editor-in-chief became in summer 2021 Constantin Blaß. Blaß had the same positions before at Express. Blaß get fired in early 2023. His successor was Christoph Reisinger, who is also editor-in-chief of the Stuttgarter Nachrichten. He took up this position on April 1, 2023.

== Ownership structure ==
The newspaper is published by the Schwarzwälder Bote Mediengesellschaft mbH publishing house (HRB 480886 AG Stuttgart), in which the Stuttgart-based Medienholding Süd GmbH (MSG) holds 90% and the Württemberger Zeitung GmbH 10% of the capital. Carsten Huber is the managing director.

On October 15, 2008, a profit and loss transfer agreement was concluded with MSG. With holdings in other publishing houses and media companies, the publishing house forms the Schwarzwälder Bote Mediengruppe division of Südwestdeutsche Medien Holding GmbH (SWMH).

Under the umbrella of the Schwarzwälder Bote Mediengruppe, the publisher brings together not only its daily newspaper titles, but also companies for advertising and online services, telephone marketing and company publications, printing and distribution.

The administration and editorial team is based at the publishing location in Oberndorf am Neckar. In 2015, the offer within the media group was expanded to include the radio station Das neue Radio Neckarburg.

The company Black Bote GmbH & Co. KG (HRA 480264 AG Stuttgart) acts as the heirs of the founder of the Black Forest messenger Wilhelm Brandecker and with 18% of the capital of the media holding Süd GmbH (MSG) as a minority owner of the parent company of Black Bote media mbH involved. As a member of the Württemberg publishers group, she holds a capital share in Südwestdeutsche Medien Holding GmbH (SWMH). SWMH is the majority owner of MSG with 82% of the capital.

Richard Rebmann is a partner in the Schwarzwälder Bote GmbH & Co. KG and publisher of the Schwarzwälder Boten.
