= Jolie (magazine) =

German fashion magazine

- August 2010 cover
- Editor-in-chief: Anja Müller-Lochner
- Categories: Fashion
- Frequency: Monthly (2003-2023); Bimonthly (2024-present)
- Publisher: Vision Media
- Total circulation: 375,642 (2010)
- First issue: 30 September 2003; 22 years ago
- Company: Axel Springer SE
- Country: Germany
- Based in: Munich
- Language: German
- Website: Jolie

Jolie is a monthly German fashion magazine published in Munich, Germany.

== History and profile ==
Jolie was first published on 30 September 2003. The magazine is part of Axel Springer SE and is published on a monthly basis by Vision Media. The headquarters of the monthly is in Munich. Anja Müller-Lochner is the editor-in-chief.

In 2010 Jolie had a total circulation of 375,642 copies.
