= Zons =

- Quarter of Dormagen
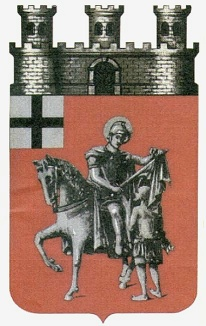
- Coat of arms
- Interactive map of Zons
- Location within Germany Location within North Rhine-Westphalia
- Coordinates: 51°07′19″N 6°50′34″E
- Country: Germany
- State: North Rhine-Westphalia
- District: Rhein-Kreis Neuss
- Town: Dormagen

Area
  - Total: 18.09 km^{2} (6.98 sq mi)

Population (2020)
  - Total: 5,452
  - Density: 301.4/km^{2} (780.6/sq mi)
- Time zone: UTC+01:00 (CET)
  - Summer (DST): UTC+02:00 (CEST)
- Postal codes: 41541
- Dialling codes: 02133
- Vehicle registration: NE

Zons (German pronunciation: [tsons]), formerly known as Feste Zons (Fortress Zons), today officially called Stadt Zons (Zons Town) is an old town in Germany on the west bank of the Lower Rhine between Cologne and Düsseldorf. It has been a part (Stadtteil) of the town of Dormagen since 1975. In 2020 its population was 5,452.

== Geography ==
The east border of Zons is the river Rhine. The river can be crossed by ferry. On the opposite bank a 3-kilometre-long (1.9-mile) road leads to Düsseldorf-Urdenbach northeast of Zons. South of Zons is fields and a few Populus trees. The southern road passes two farms and leads to another part of Dormagen, Rheinfeld. West of Zons is extensive meadows with the willows here and there. At some distance the small hamlet Nachtigall lies at the Bundesstraße 9. Northwest of Zons is the Zons Heath. The northern road leads to Stürzelberg, another part of Dormagen. North of ferry slip and ship pier begins the nature reserve Zonser Grind on the western bank of the Rhine.

== History ==
=== Middle Ages ===
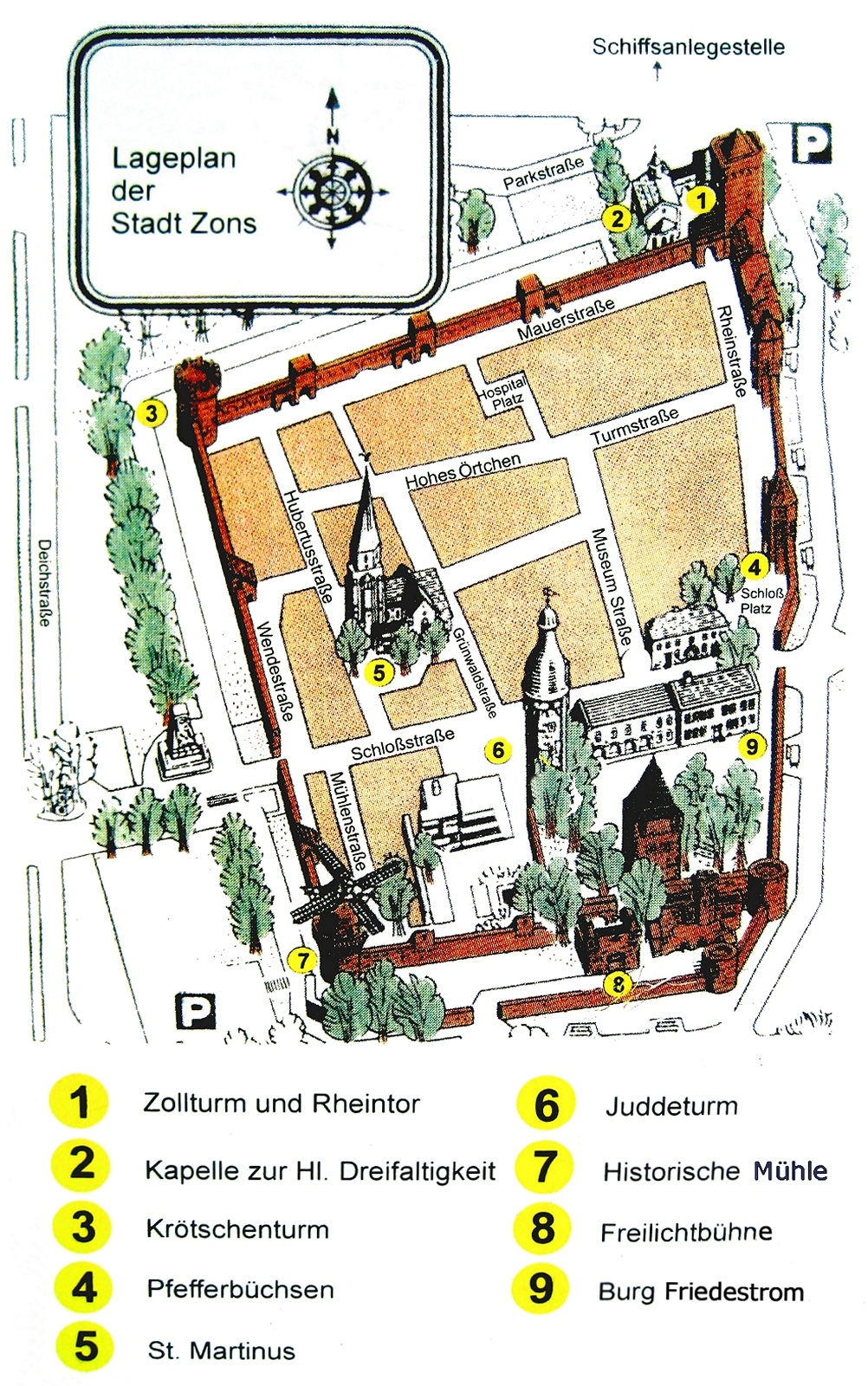
Plan of Zons Town with historical buildings: 1 Toll Tower and Rhine Gate, 2 Holy Trinity Chapel, 3 Krötschen Tower, 4 Pepper Pots, 5 St. Martinus, 6 Judde Tower, 7 Historic Mill, 8 Open Air Theatre, 9 Friedestrom Castle

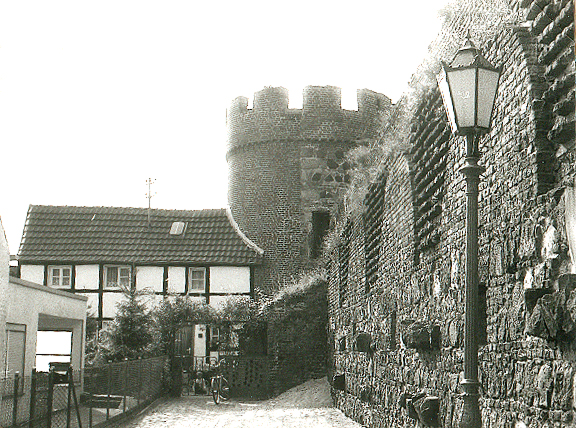
Town wall Zons with „Krötschenturm“ (Krötschen Tower) (1977)

The first time Zons was mentioned in a document is in the so-called last will and testament of Cunibert, Bishop of Cologne, which was written in the middle of the seventh century but is only known in a version of the late eleventh century. In the document the names of Zuonizo or Zuonize are mentioned with their origin still unclear until today. In a deed of gift of Archbishop Heribert of Cologne the name of Zons appears in a location reference, „Burgula bei Zünce“ (Burgula near Zünce)., Burgula being the site of today's Haus Bürgel, an old mansion built on the ruins of a Roman settlement.

Archaeological finds indicate that there was a Merovingian settlement in Zons in the seventh century, yet its exact location is not determined. Documents verify a Fronhof of the archbishop of Cologne (Fronhof = estate of a feudal lord receiving socage) existing in Zons at least since the beginning of the twelfth century . In the 1980s archaeological excavations in the castle area uncovered foundations of buildings which are regarded as remains of the proprietary church of the lord of the manor which was part of the building complex of the Fronhof.

At about the middle of the thirteenth century Zons castrum (castle) was fortified. The location of the older rural settlement of Zons can only be presumed based on field-names and topography. The field-name „Im Hofstädtchen“ at today's Aldenhovenstraße near the Old Town could reference to this settlement with the crossing paths at this spot being a possible additional indicator.

In 1372 the Archbishop of Cologne Friedrich III von Saarwerden moved the Rhine toll castle from Neuss upstream to Zons protecting it with walls and moats and granting Zons the town privileges in 1373. At the centre of the fortress was the thick fortified Friedestrom Castle which served the administration and protection of the toll and housed the administration of the new parish Zons. The obviously planned building of the toll fortress with town walls was finished probably in the 15th century.

The rectangular to trapeziform town layout is surrounded by a wall strengthened with basalt stones. The wall stretches in north–south direction over about 300 metres (330 yd) and in west–east direction over 250 metres (270 yd). At the corners are towers built in different shapes: to the northeast the rectangular Rhein-, Zoll- or Peters-Turm (Rhine, Toll or Peters Tower); to the northwest the circular Krötschenturm (Krötschen Tower); to the southwest the circular Mühlenturm (Mill Tower), which was converted from a defensive tower to a tower mill as late as the Late Middle Ages; to the southeast the Schlossturm (Palace Tower) and in town at the castle wall the circular Juddeturm (Judde Tower: 35 metres (115 ft) high, roof starts at 24 metres (79 ft) height, baroque roof 11 metres (36 ft)). The name Juddeturm probably refers to the patrician family Jude in Cologne.

Two public gates gave access to the town: in the north the Rheintor (Rhine Gate), in the west the Feldtor (Field Gate). During the 19th century the first was partly, the latter almost entirely dismantled. A third outer gate, the Südtor (South Gate), which is preserved best, is the entrance from the zwinger (enclosed killing ground) to the Vorburg (lower ward).

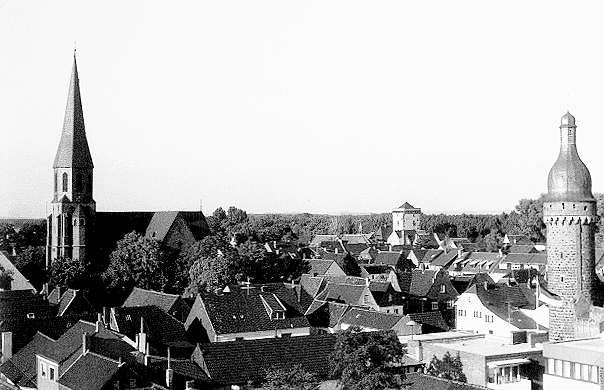
View on the Old Town of Zons (1977)

The small town had only 124 plots for houses. The parish Zons comprised also the village Stürzelberg, part of the village Horrem and the village of Haus Bürgel, which is nowadays located on the opposite banks of the river Rhine. Regarding church and court of justice matters Haus Bürgel and Zons originally belonged together. The canon law for the parish Bürgel/Zons was governed by Brauweiler Abbey. Already in 1374 Bürgel was moved from the west banks to east banks of the Rhine, probably due to a shift of the river. Zons, the Rhine toll town of the Prince-elector of Cologne is regarded as one of the best preserved Lower Rhine planned towns of the Late Middle Ages. Until 1794 the parish Zons belonged to the Electorate of Cologne and was bordered in the south by Dormagen, an enclave ruled by the Duchy of Jülich; in the south-west by Hackenbroich, a lordship within the Electorate of Cologne; in the west by Nievenheim, a parish within the Electorate of Cologne; in the north-west by Uedesheim, another lordship within the Electorate of Cologne. On the opposite banks of the Rhine were Urdenbach and Baumberg, Honschaften (lowest level administrative units similar to hundreds in England and Wales) within the Duchy of Berg.

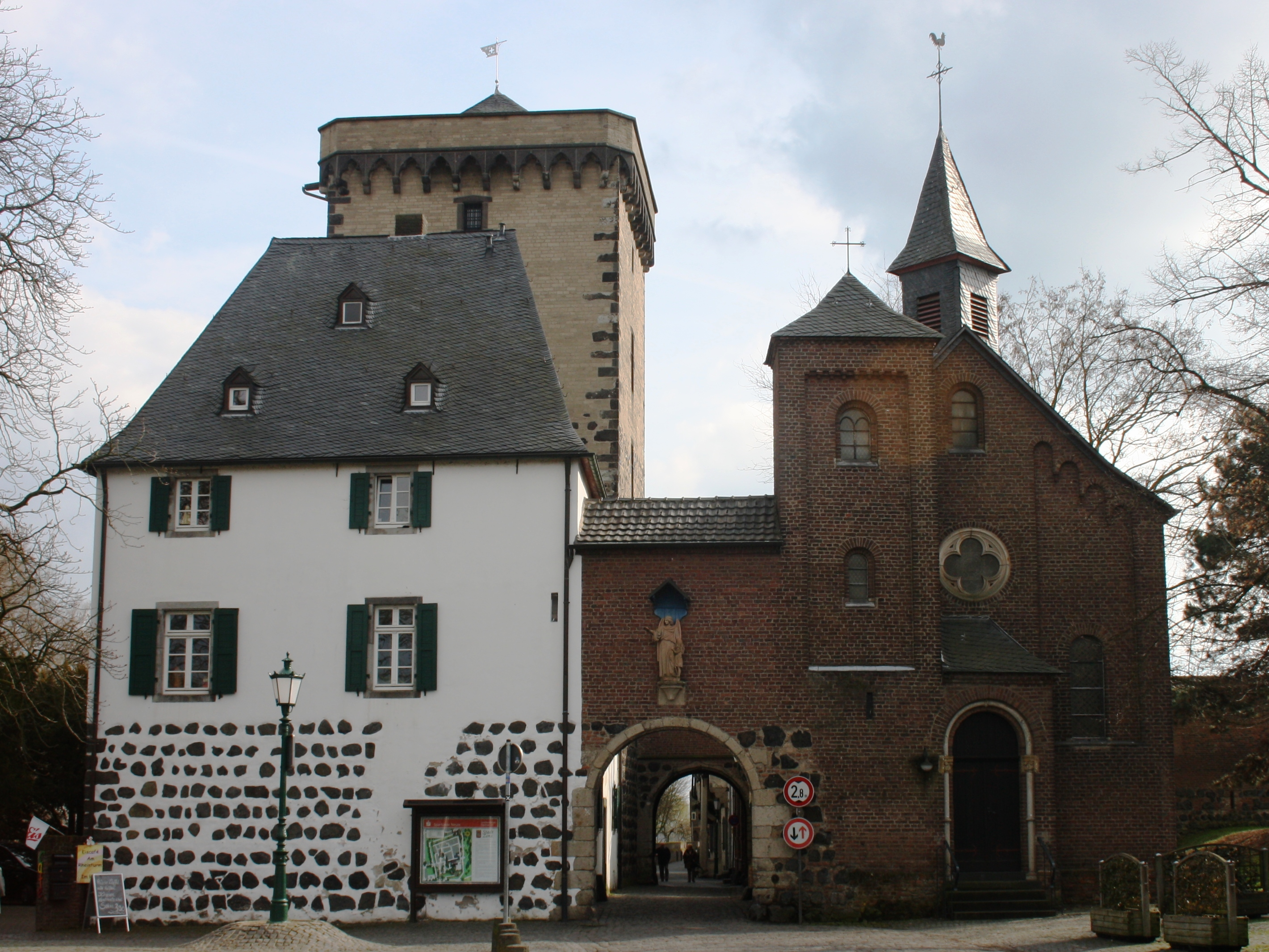
Rheintor (Rhine Gate) with Zollturm (Toll Tower) in the northeast

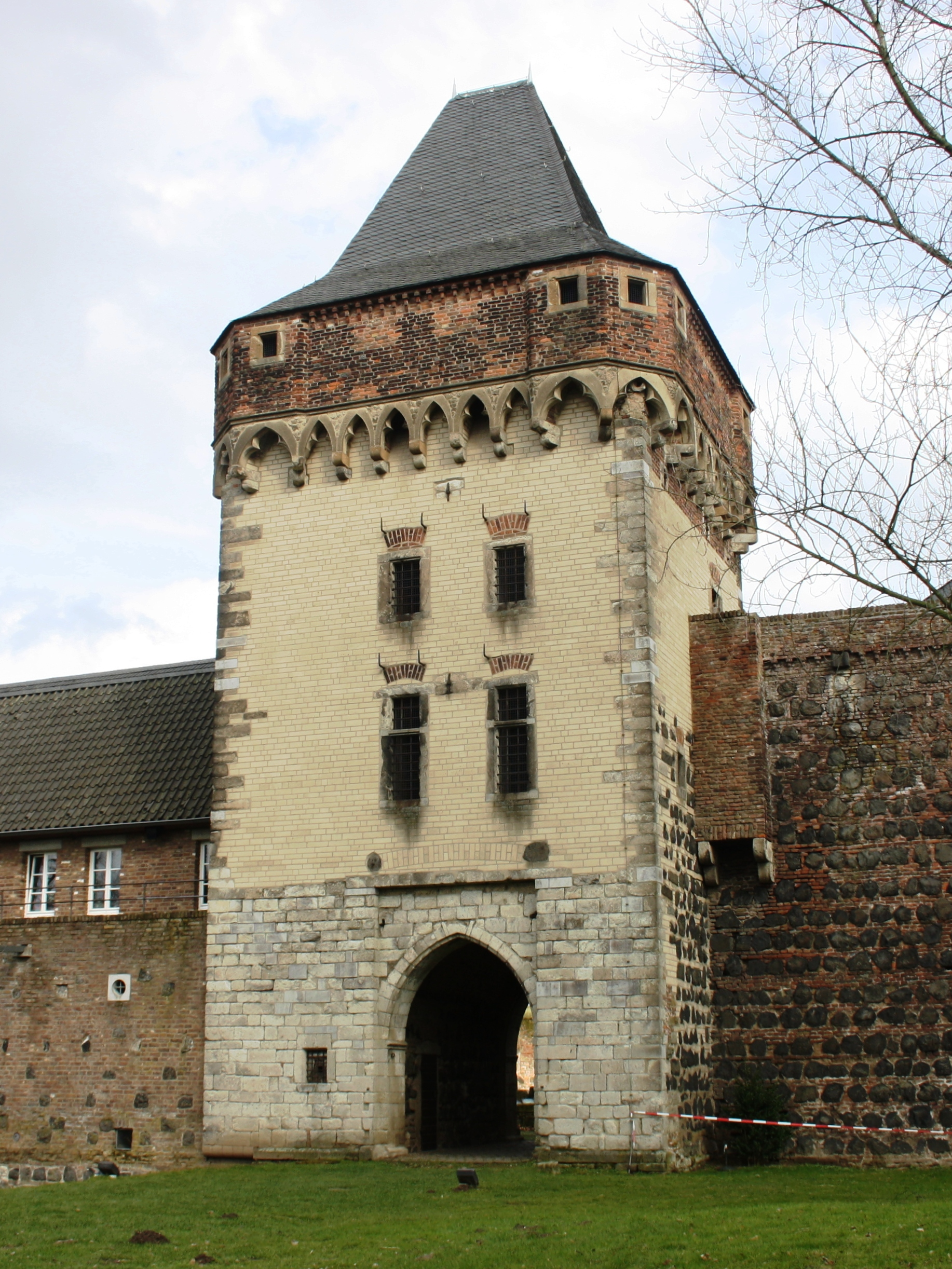
Gate tower of Friedestrom Castle

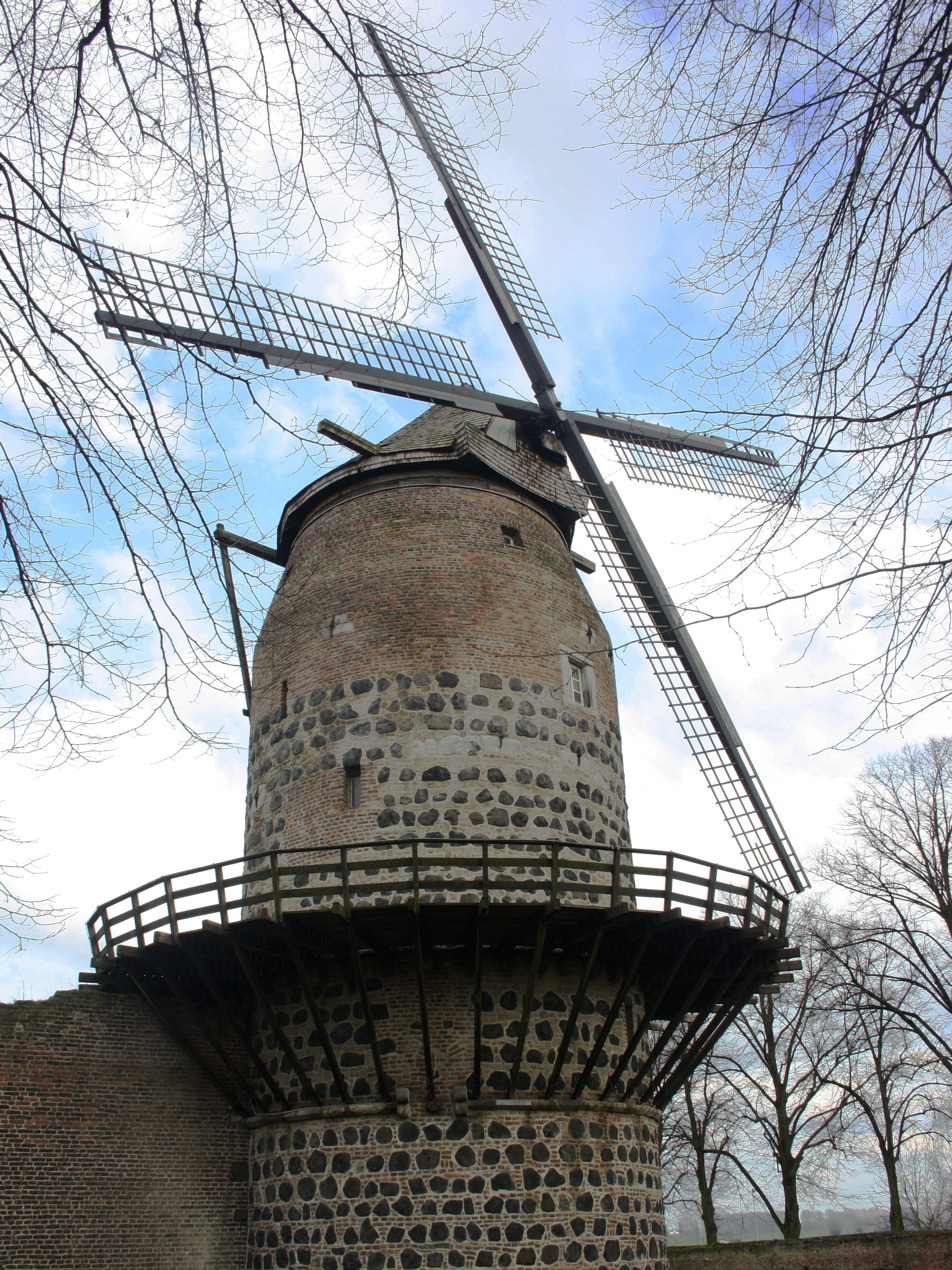
Mühlenturm (Mill Tower) in the southwest

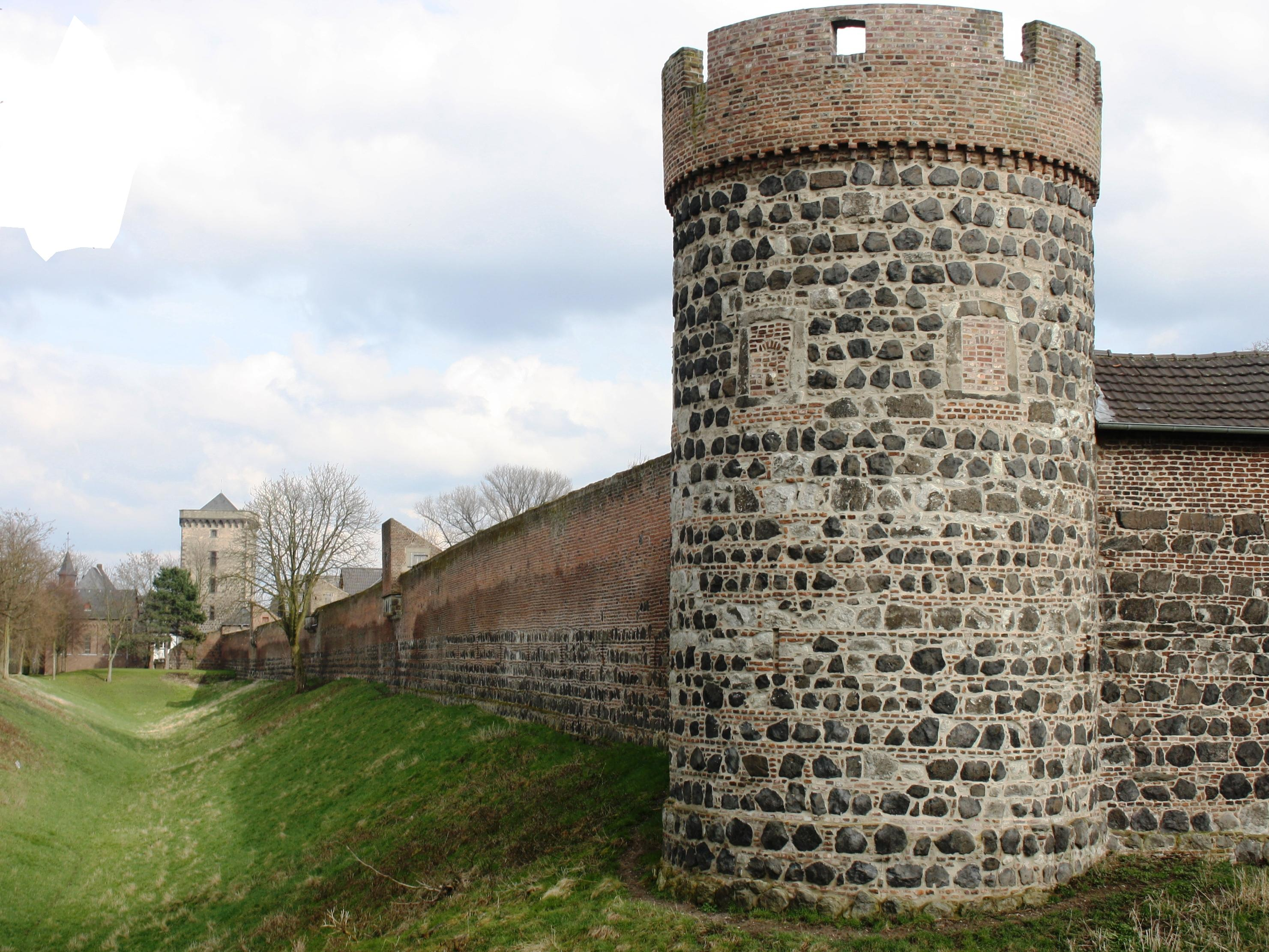
Krötschenturm (Krötschen Tower) in the northwest

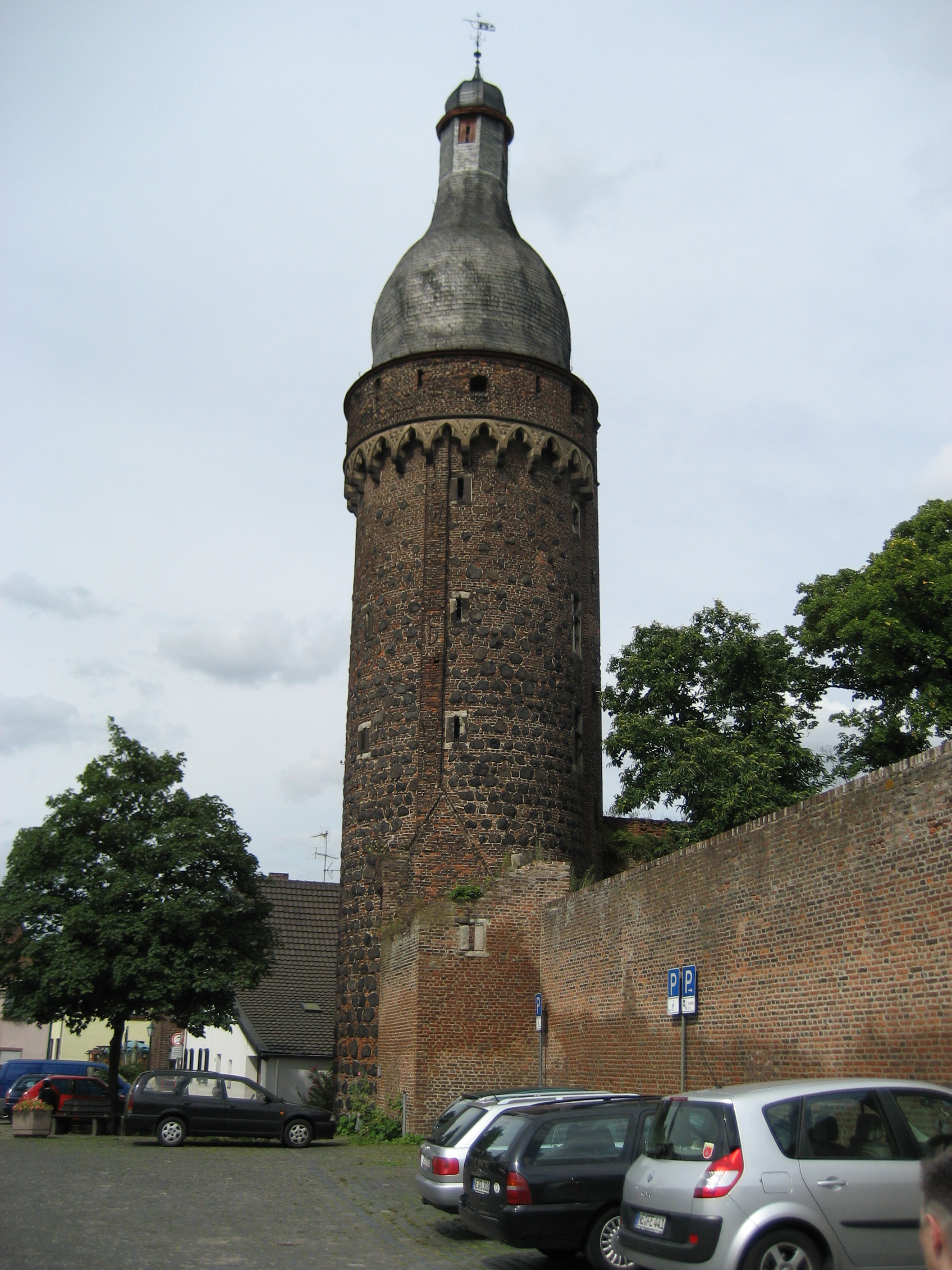
Juddeturm (Judde Tower)

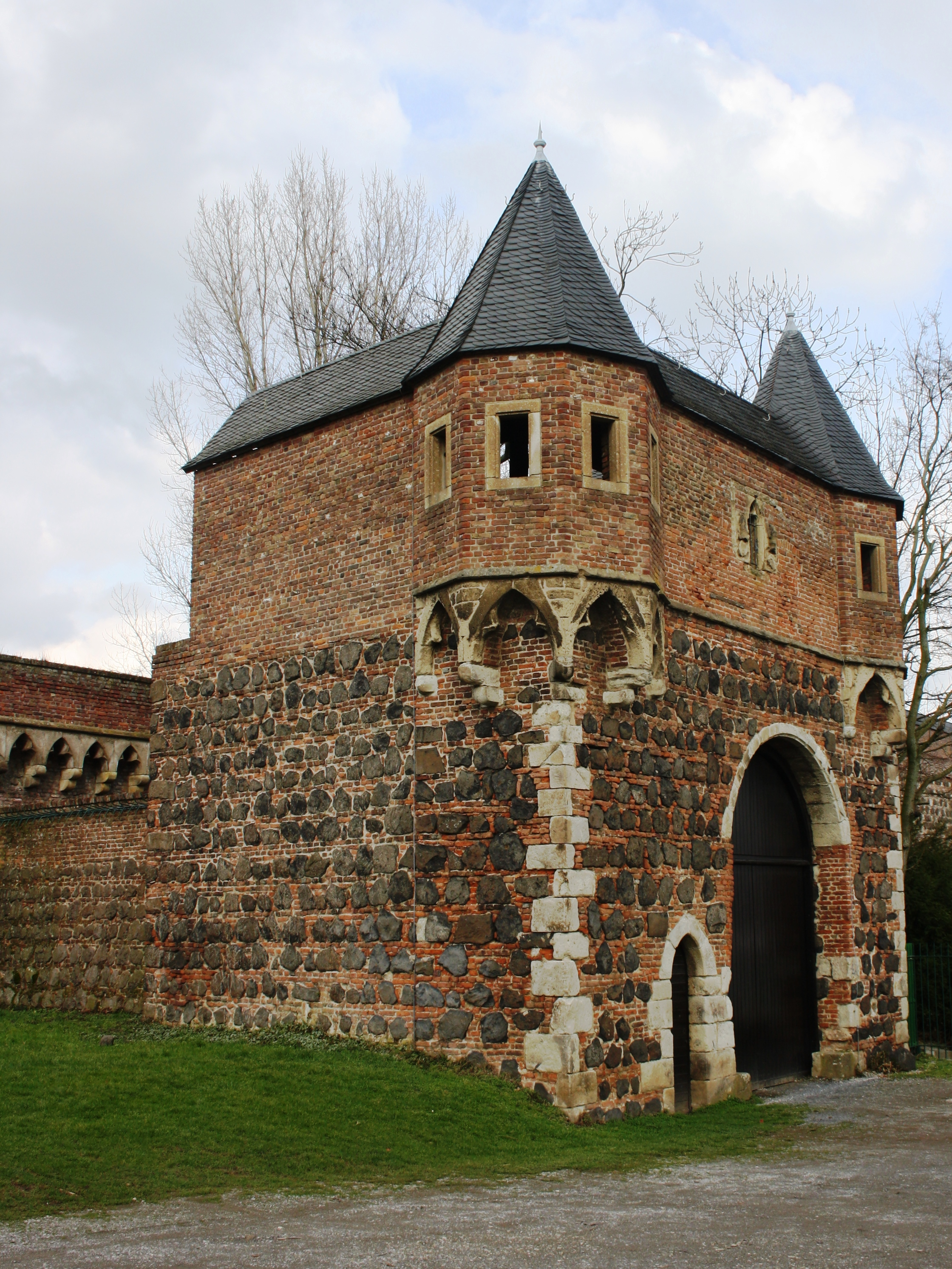
Südtor (South Gate)

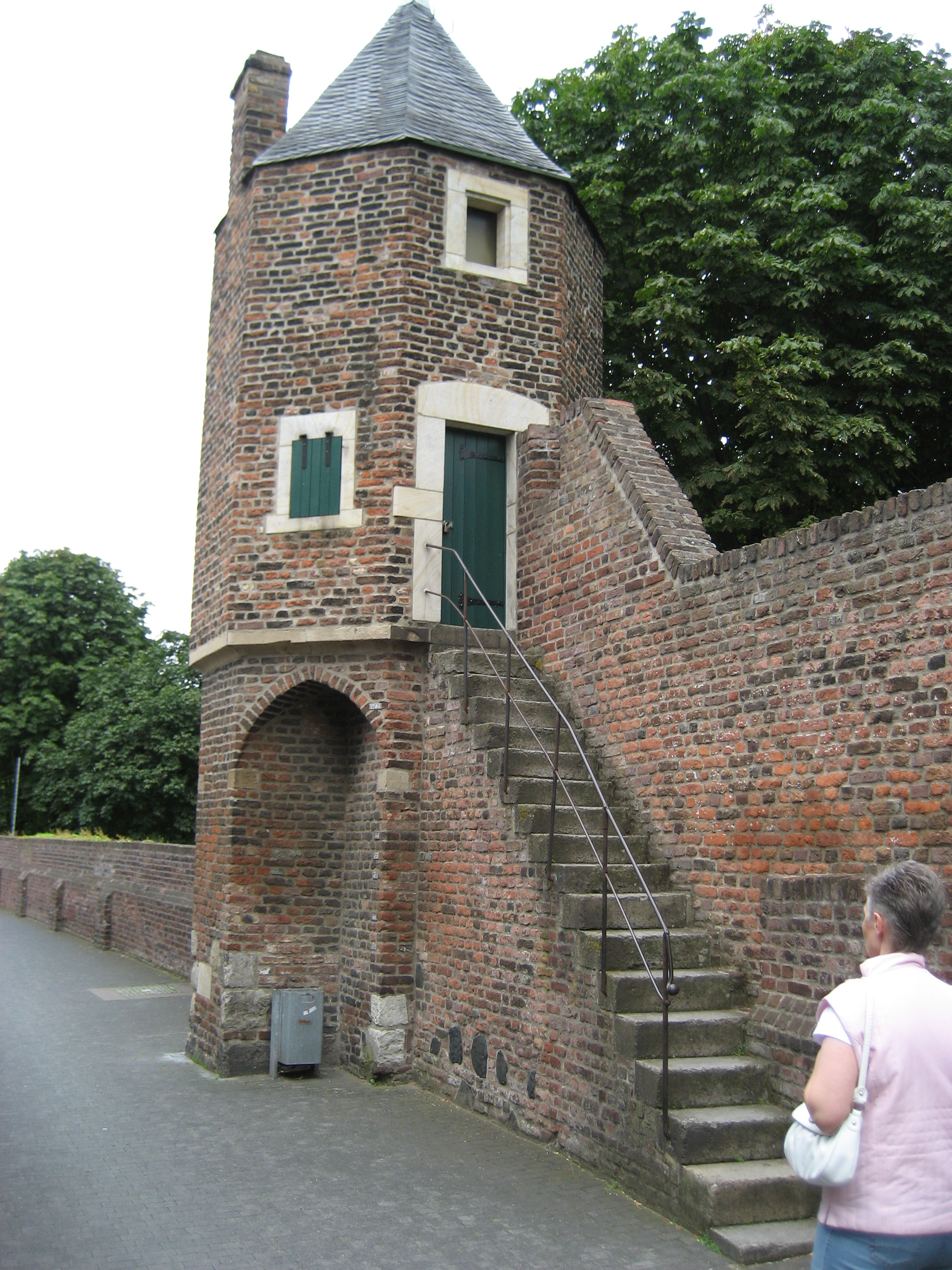
Bartizan on the eastern town wall; in German popularly called Pfefferbüchse (Pepper pot)

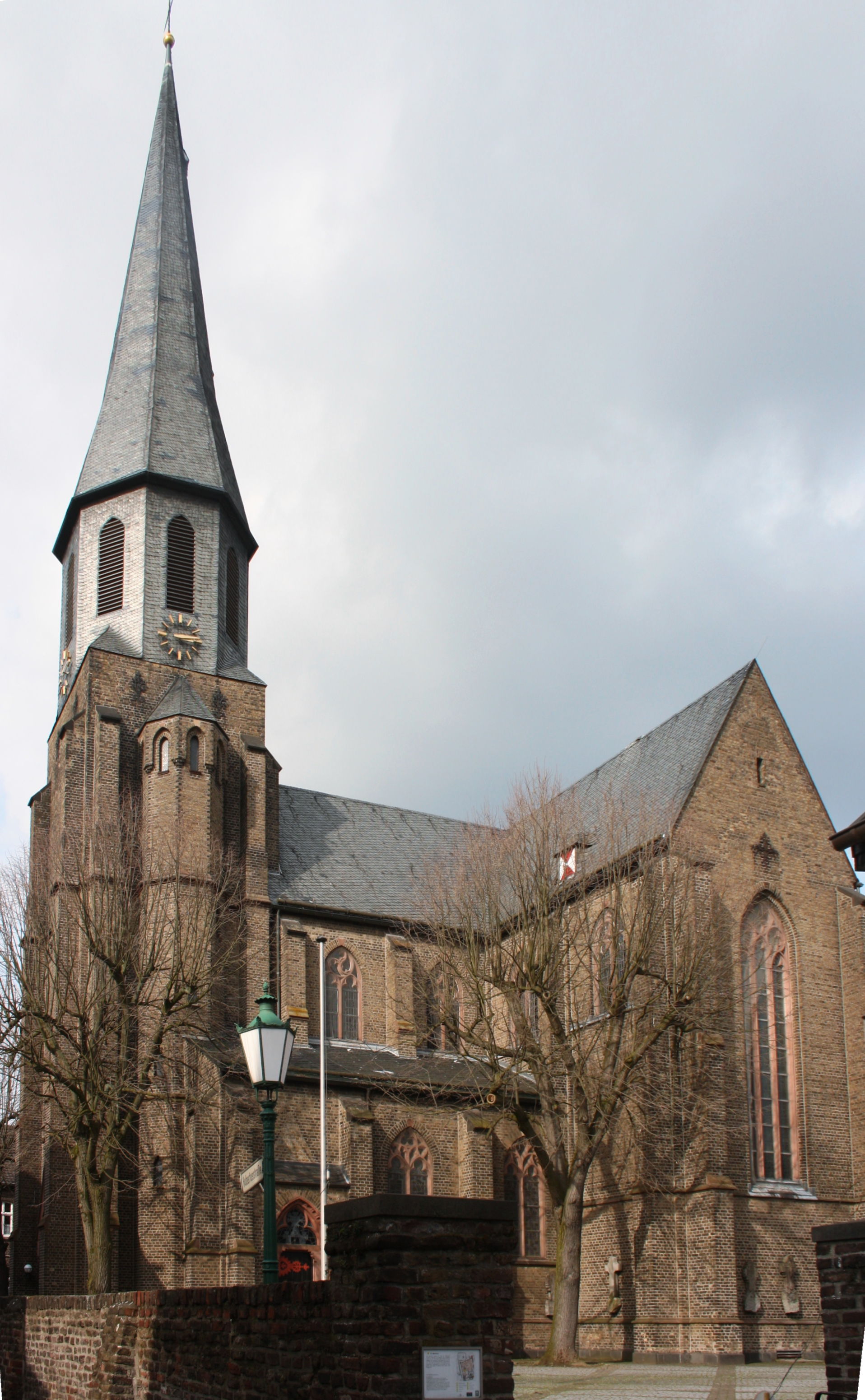
Parish church St. Martinus

=== Modern Era ===
In 1463 Archbishop of Cologne Dietrich II. of Moers mortgaged town and parish Zons to the cathedral chapter of Cologne. Its reign lasted until 1794, when the French Revolutionary Army occupied the territory west of the Rhine. Zons became a French municipality and canton. From 1798 to 1814 it was part of the canton Dormagen within the Arrondissement de Cologne which belonged to the Département de la Roer. With the Treaty of Lunéville in 1801 the occupied territory on the left bank of the Rhine came to France under public international law.

As result of the Congress of Vienna Zons became part of the Prussian State in 1815. The following year the district Neuss was set up with the Bürgermeisterei Zons (an administrative level similar to an Amt) which comprised the municipalities of Zons, Nachtigall, St. Peter and Stürzelberg. In 1882 the district Neuss became part of the Regierungsbezirk Düsseldorf in the Rhine Province. Since about 1900 Zons has been a popular destination for pleasure trips. In 1904 the municipality Zons was granted its own coat of arms. Since then Zons was called again „Town”, despite the fact that it still belonged to the Prussian rural municipalities regarding administrative law. With the incorporation into the town limits of Dormagen with effect of 1 Januar 1975 Zons called itself „Feste“ (Fortress). In 1992 Zons again gained the description „Town”, though only as Titularstadt (titular town). Already in 1972 the whole Old Town underwent an extensive renovation in an exemplary project sponsored by Federal State and Federated State.

=== Demographics ===
Since the 14th century Zons didn't change much regarding town area and population, probably due to its disadvantageous access to road traffic. During the course of the centuries the town was stricken three times by great fires: 1464, 1547 and 1620. Before the last great fire there were reports about a certain flourishing in economic terms due to trading. Yet the 17th century turned out to be a painful one for Zons. Economic and demographic decline ensue after that great fire, an (unsuccessful) siege and heavy bombardment at the end of the Thirty Years' War, several disastrous plagues and frequent occupations by Cologne and French troops. 1648 Zons had a population of 172, Stürzelberg of 49. After a gradual increase in population in the parish Zons 255 people died due to the plague in 1666. From about 1700 there was a noticeable increase in population: in 1692 the parish had a population of 308, in 1738 there were already 831 people who had received the First Communion and eventually in 1799 there was a population of 1,054. In the 18th century the population was almost entirely Catholic. During that time only a few Jewish families lived in Zons increasing in numbers to almost 50 people by 1806. During the course of 19th century up to the beginning of the 20th century the population grew relatively slowly yet almost steadily in comparison to the overall demographic development. In 1849 Zons together with Stürzelberg counted for 2,012 people, in 1928 1,306 people lived in Zons and 1,428 in Stürzelberg, thus 2,734 in total. On 30 June 1964 the at that time “town” Zons (comprising also the villages of Stürzelberg, St. Peter und Nachtigall) had a population of 6,310 which increased to 9,715 on 30 June 1974.

Population Development in Quarter Zons:

Population Development
Year	Population	Year	Population	Year	Population
1974	5.521	1975	5.425	1976	6.160
1985	5.860	1995	5.790	2004	5.319
2005	5.405	2007	5.370	2010	5.371

== Government ==
=== Mayors ===
- 1800–1812: Matthias Aldenhoven
- 1813–1828: Anton Baaden
- 1829–1837: Franz Michael Fischer
- 1837–1848: Peter Mathias Schumacher
- 1848–1851: Josef Schneider
- 1851–1858: Josef Hanstein
- 1858–1879: Eduard Bacciocco
- 1879–1900: Hermann Heckmann
- 1900–1909: Nikolaus Kohl
- 1909–1910: Josef Trapet
- 1910–1923: Albert Granderath
- 1923–1926: Stephan Güsgen
- 1926–1928: Emil Kirchhoff
- 1928–1945: Michael Flücken
- 1945–1946: Johann Scheer (until January 1946 only for municipality Zons)
- 1945–1946: Franz Bebber (for Stürzelberg)

=== Honorary Mayors ===
- 1946: Gerhard Justenhoven
- 1946–1948: Wilhelm Fleischhauer
- 1948–1952: Bernhard Kamm
- 1952–1962: Hermann Schmitz
- 1962–1969: Georg Lerch
- 1969–1974: Hannelu Manitz, Deputy: Hans Wingerath

=== Town Clerks and Chief Executives ===
- 1946–1961: Johann Scheer
- 1961–1973: Artur Elicker
- 1973–1974: Johann Schmitz, General Deputy: Reinhold Schwarz

=== Coat of Arms ===
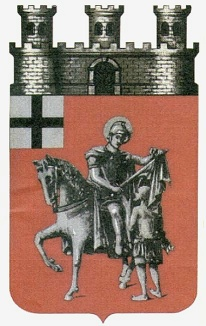
Former coat of arms of Zons

From 1904 until the incorporation into the town of Dormagen Zons had its own coat of arms. Blazon: “Gules a saint argent on a horse cutting his cloak with a sword to share it with a scantily clad man standing in front of him, on a canton argent a cross sable. “ As town coat of arms it is oftén depicted with a silver three-towered battlement coping including a black gate in the middle placed on the top (chief) of the escutcheon.

Coat of arms explanation: The saint is Martin of Tours, the black cross on a silver background is the coat of arms of the Electorate of Cologne.

== Economy and Infrastructure ==
Up to the modern era the people of Zons earned their living in farming. In addition to that the trade of grain, beer and wine as well as some crafts like brick-making had partly an importance beyond the parish borders. The people of the village Stürzelberg worked mostly as fishermen or day labourers. A privileged group by wealth and social background were the toll collectors until around 1800. They had no civil rights, therefore they were freed from serving civil duties. At the beginning of the 20th century an industrial plant was established near Stürzelberg and St. Peter. In Zons itself industrial activities didn't happen.

Housing in Zons town expanded relatively late beyond the town walls. The first residential buildings "extra muros" were erected at the beginning of the 19th century. First housing estates can be found only at the end of the 19th century. At first buildings were concentrated at the paths immediate to the fortress. Later, especially after World War II, housing spread out to the north and the west of the Old Town.

=== Media ===
- Neuss-Grevenbroicher-Zeitung - regional newspaper, published by Neusser Zeitungsverlag GmbH, owned by Rheinische Post
- Schaufenster - local free paper (Tuesday & Saturday), published by Druck + Verlag Josef Wegener GmbH, owned by Girardet Verlag KG
- Rheinischer Anzeiger - local free paper (Wednesday), published by Druck + Verlag Josef Wegener GmbH, owned by Girardet Verlag KG
- Westdeutsche Zeitung, local editorial office district Neuss - regional newspaper, published by Verlag W. Girardet KG
- NE-WS 89.4 - local radio station owned by Rheinische Post

=== Transport ===
Zons is located 2 kilometres (1.2 miles) east of Bundesstraße 9. The distance from Zons to junction „Dormagen, Nievenheim, Zons“ of the Bundesautobahn 57 is 4 kilometres (2.5 miles).

==== Shipping ====
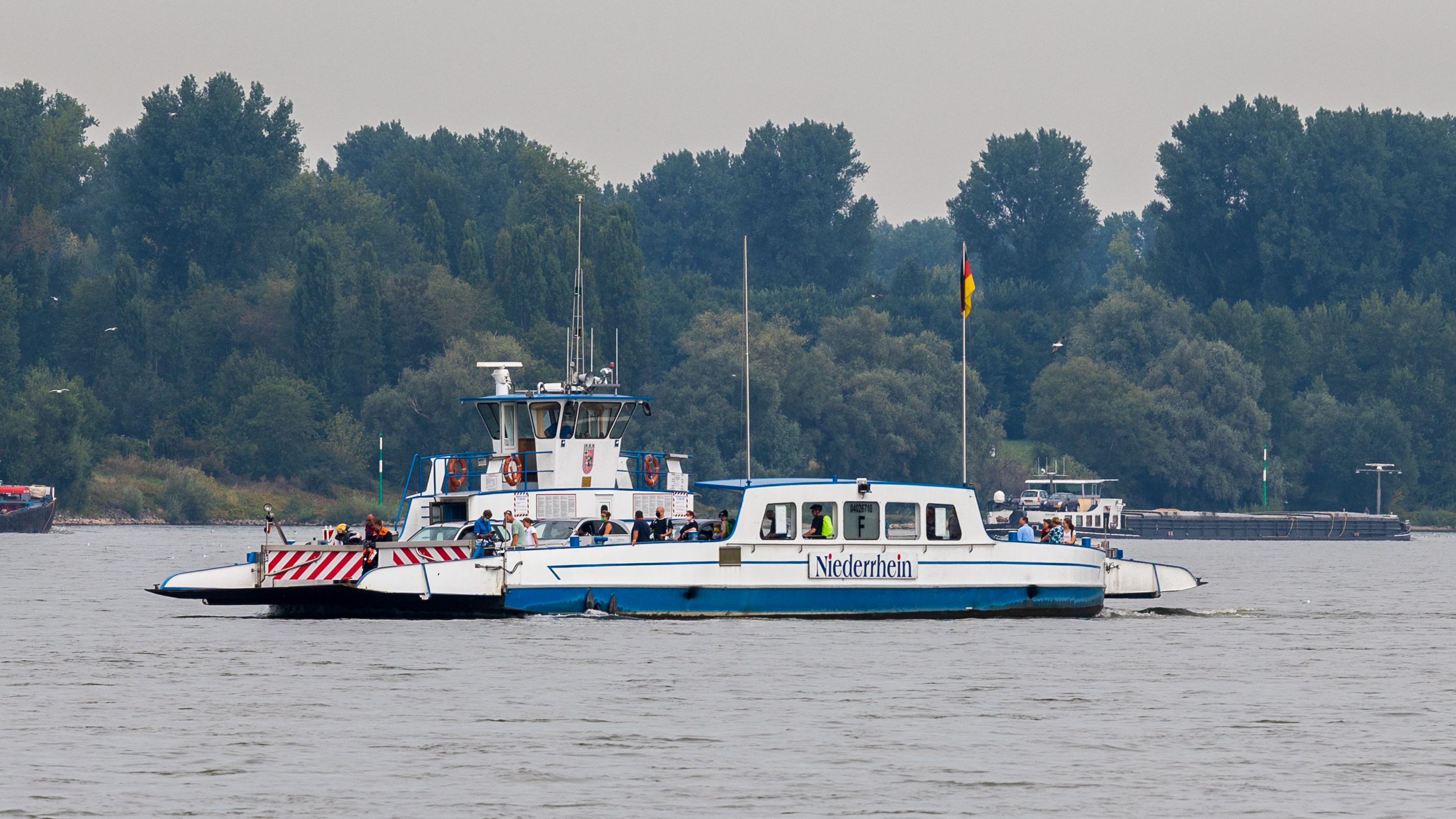
Rhine ferry from Zons to Urdenbach

A car ferry runs frequently between Zons und Düsseldorf-Urdenbach. The river cruise operator Köln-Düsseldorfer offers day excursions to Zons from Cologne and Düsseldorf on selected days during the summer.

==== Bus lines ====
The following lines within the VRR run through Zons:

- 875: Neuss Landestheater - Grimlinghausen - Stüttgen - Stürzelberg - Zons -Dormagen Bhf. -Marktplatz
- 886: Rheinfeld - Marktplatz – Dormagen Bhf. - Zons - Stürzelberg - Delrath - Nievenheim S-Bhf.
- 887: Rheinfeld - Marktplatz - Dormagen Bhf. - Zons - Stürzelberg - Delrath - Nievenheim S-Bhf
- WE2: Rheinfeld - Marktplatz - Dormagen Bhf. - Zons - Stürzelberg - Delrath - Nievenheim S-Bhf (WeekendExpress)
- NE2: Dormagen Bhf. - Zons - Stürzelberg - Delrath - Nievenheim S-Bhf (NightExpress)

=== Public Facilities ===
- Primary School
- Pitch (sports field)
- Tennis court
- Gym
- Kindergartens
- Old people's day centres
- District museum (located in the manor house and stables on the grounds of Friedestrom Castle)
- District archive and international dialect archive "Ludwig Soumagne" (located in west and south wing of Friedestrom Castle)
- Volunteer fire brigade
- Super market

== Culture and Leisure ==
- Toll fortress
- District museum
- Jewish cemetery
- “Hannepützheide” in Zons Heath: in this nature reserve heather grows on a former Rhine dune and a large children's playground is available.
- Fairy-tale plays in the Open Air Theatre (located in the Zwinger (killing ground) of Friedestrom Castle)
- Annual medieval tournament in September
- Schützenfest (marksmen's festival) in July

== People ==
- Franz Joseph Aldenhoven, lessee of Zons Castle, since 1850 temporary Landrat (chairperson) of the district of Neuss. Member of the Prussian House of Representatives 1849 -1853. Backer of the Rhineland sugar industry and the cultivation of sugar beet.
- Georg Stoll, Senator in Greifswald, Member of the Reichstag, drowned in Rhine in July 1883 in unclear circumstances.

== Bibliography ==
- Jörg H. Baumgarten: Zons – Ein Stadtführer. Köln, 1989. ISBN 3879092370
- Helene Blum-Spicker: 600 Jahre Stadt Zons. 1373 – 1973. Dormagen, 5. Auflage 1985.
- Nicolaus Bömmels: Die ehemaligen Rittergüter in den Kreisen Grevenbroich und Neuss. In: Almanach für den Kreis Neuss 1979. Neuss 1979, S. 32-51.
- Karl Emsbach: Zons - Portrait einer alten Stadt. Hrsg. vom Heimat- und Verkehrsverein der Stadt Zons e.V., Dormagen, 2000. ISBN 3926963441
- Karl Emsbach: Zons. Rheinische Kunststätten, Heft 496; Hg.: Rheinischer Verein für Denkmalpflege und Landschaftsschutz, Neuss, 2006.
- Aenne Hansmann: Geschichte von Stadt und Amt Zons. Mit einem Beitrag von Artur Elicker, Jakob Justenhoven und Herbert Milz. Düsseldorf 1973.
- Aenne Hansmann, Margret Wensky: Rheinischer Städteatlas Zons. Lieferung IV, Nr. 25. 1978, 2. verb. u. erg. Aufl. Köln 1990. ISBN 379271115X
- Maria-Elisabeth Kirchhoff-Werle, Hans Georg Kirchhoff: Zons – Geschichte und Geschichten. Historische Schriftenreihe der Stadt Dormagen, Bd. 11, Dormagen 1993. ISBN 3926963123
- Werner Lisken (Bearb.): Die Familien der historischen Stadt Zons und der katholischen Pfarre St. Martin (mit den Ortsteilen Bürgel, Grind, Nachtigall, Sankt Peter und Stürzelberg) von 1664 bis 1900. Ein genealogisches Nachschlagewerk. Veröffentlichungen der Gesellschaft für Familienkunde e.V., Sitz Köln, Bd. 293, Köln 2014. ISBN 9783865791085
- Thomas Schwabach: Die Schwieren-Chroniken aus Zons. Bemerkenswertes aus einer niederrheinischen Kleinstadt und ihrer Umgebung 1733-1823. Veröffentlichungen des Kreisheimatbundes Neuss e.V. Nr. 15, Köln 2005. ISBN 3980801799
- Detlev Zenk: Zons - Alte Zollfeste am Rhein. Düsseldorf 2005. ISBN 3935873093
