= Südwest Presse =

German newspaper in Ulm, Baden-Württemberg

- Type: Daily newspaper (except Sundays)
- Format: Rhenish
- Publisher: Neue Pressegesellschaft mbh & Co. KG
- Editor: Ulrich Becker
- Founded: 1946
- Headquarters: Ulm, Germany
- Circulation: 262,220 (2018)
- Website: www.swp.de

Südwest Presse is a German daily newspaper based in Ulm, which is distributed in Ulm, Neu-Ulm, Alb-Donau-Kreis and Landkreis Neu-Ulm. It is also the name of a regional cooperative venture (called a Zeitungsverbund – newspaper composite) of over 20 local publications that share regional and national features. All of these newspapers together cover about a third of Baden-Württemberg. Südwest's publishing house Neue Pressegesellschaft prints most of them.

== Circulation ==
The paid circulation of all regional imprints in 2012 was 294,251 (excluding Bietigheimer Zeitung and Eberbacher Zeitung), while the paid circulation of the Südwest Presse newspaper was 59,959. The distribution area of Ulm, Neu-Ulm and Alb-Donau-Kreis overlaps with several other dailies, including Schwäbische Zeitung, the Augsburger Allgemeinen and the Stuttgarter Nachrichten, and so there is a competitive relationship despite their correspondent and economic co-operation, detailed below. Südwest Presse, along with most of its sister newspapers, is printed in Rhenish format. A few of the smaller affiliated newspapers use Berliner style.

== Regional News Network ==
The main office of Neue Pressegesellschaft in Ulm issues Südwest Presse-produced national and regional stories for a large number of local publishers. The sections produced are Internationale und Bundes-Politik (international and federal politics), Wirtschaft (economy), Südwest-Umschau (Southwestern sights), Feuilleton (features), Kulturspiegel (cultural mirror), Brennpunkt (focus), Blick in die Welt (worldview), überregionaler Sport (sports in the region), Wochenendbeilage (weekend supplement), and Sonderveröffentlichungen (Special publications). Associated newspapers may use and adapt any of these sections in their own daily newspaper, which they combine with their own local news. The Südwest Presse daily prints almost all of these sections. It is one of the only local newspapers that operates (partly with other newspapers) its own correspondent offices (for instance, in Berlin, Moscow, Washington DC, Paris, London, Rome, and Stuttgart). A total of 18 publishers are behind the correspondent group, located in a region from Bad Mergentheim in the north to Villingen-Schwenningen in the southwest.

== Other ventures ==
Neue Pressegesellschaft (NPG) has a 50 percent stake in the Märkisches publishing company, which produces Märkische Oderzeitung. The other 50 percent is owned by Stuttgarter Zeitung Verlagsgesellschaft mbH, which prints the Stuttgarter Zeitung and the Stuttgarter Nachrichten. Südwest has invested in some of the other local papers, including the Bietigheimer Zeitung, the Hohenloher Tagblatt (69.2%), the Geislinger Zeitung (50%) and the Schwäbisches Tagblatt (49%). They print a weekly public journal for Ulm, Göppingen, Reutlingen, Metzingen, Münsingen and Crailsheim, which includes classifieds. The company also owns Südwest Mail, a local postal service.

== Regional issues and associated newspapers ==
Locale	Associated newspaper	Paid circulation (2012)
Aalen, Ellwangen	Schwäbische Post	24,666
Bad Mergentheim	Tauber-Zeitung	5,271
Balingen/Albstadt	Zollern-Alb-Kurier with Schmiecha-Zeitung	21,818
Bietigheim-Bissingen	Bietigheimer Zeitung	11,830
Bönnigheim	Bönnigheimer Zeitung	No Data
Crailsheim	Hohenloher Tagblatt	14,013
Dietenheim	Illertal Bote	No Data
Eberbach (Baden)	Eberbacher Zeitung	2,441
Ehingen (Donau)	Ehinger Tagblatt	5,599
Gaildorf	Rundschau für den Schwäbischen Wald – Der Kocherbote	4,495
Geislingen an der Steige	Geislinger Zeitung	12,145
Giengen an der Brenz	Brenztal-Bote	1,438
Göppingen	NWZ – Neue Württembergische Zeitung	32,073
Hechingen	Hohenzollerische Zeitung	6,563
Heidenheim an der Brenz	Heidenheimer Neue Presse	6,343
Heidenheim	Heidenheimer Zeitung	25,987
Horb am Neckar	Neckar-Chronik	5,178
Kirchheim unter Teck	Der Teckbote	14,698
Laichingen	Südwest Presse – Ausgabe Laichingen	No Data
Metzingen	Metzinger-Uracher Volksblatt / Der Ermstalbote	No Data
Münsingen	Alb Bote	4,702
Neu-Ulm	Südwest Presse (formerly Schwäbische Donau Zeitung)	12,578
Pfullingen	Pfullinger Zeitung	No Data
Reutlingen	Reutlinger Nachrichten (with Pfullinger Zeitung and Metzinger-Uracher Volksblatt)	11,881
Sachsenheim	Sachsenheimer Zeitung	No Data
Schwäbisch Gmünd	Gmünder Tagespost	9,883
Schwäbisch Hall	Haller Tagblatt	17,014
Tübingen	Schwäbisches Tagblatt	40,820
Ulm, Neu-Ulm, Alb-Donau-Kreis	Südwest Presse (previously Schwäbische Donau Zeitung)	59,959
Villingen-Schwenningen	Südwest Presse – Die Neckarquelle	7,663
