= Robert Koch Institute Files =

Internal documents concerning the COVID-19 pandemic in Germany

The Robert Koch Institute Files, or RKI Files, are a series of internal documents, primarily meeting minutes, from the Robert Koch Institute (RKI) COVID-19 crisis management team. A first batch of documents, extending from January 2020 to April 2021, was released in heavily redacted form in March 2024 by the RKI following a Freedom of Information request by journalist Paul Schreyer. In July 2024, journalist Aya Velázquez released the fully unredacted documents from 2020 to 2023, which were leaked to her by a whistleblower at the RKI. The documents detail the deliberations of the RKI team in charge of the crisis response to the COVID-19 pandemic in Germany. The revealed documents sparked an ongoing controversy in Germany, where critics question the political influence on the RKI, and the extent to which measures against COVID-19 followed scientific evidence or political criteria.

== Background ==
The COVID-19 pandemic in Germany has resulted in 38,437,875 confirmed cases of COVID-19 and 174,979 deaths. During the pandemic, the German government received advice from several scientific bodies including the Standing Committee on Vaccination (STIKO) at the Robert Koch Institute, the German National Academy of Sciences Leopoldina, and the German Ethics Council.

== Publication ==
In May 2021, Paul Schreyer, journalist and founder of Multipolar, filed a Freedom of Information Act request for the release of all minutes of the Robert Koch Institute COVID-19 crisis team. The RKI released the minutes for the period from January 2020 to April 2021. The released documents were heavily redacted, and Schreyer initiated a challenge of the redactions in Court. In May 2024, these documents were published on the RKI website in a less redacted edition. Multipolar filed a request for the release of documents since May 2021, which were not included in the releases so far.

On 23 July 2024, Berlinese journalist Aya Velázquez published a 10GB cache of internal RKI documents. The collection includes fully unredacted RKI crisis team meeting minutes from 2020 to 2023. According to Velázquez, the source of the documents was a RKI employee. The documents were presented in a press conference streamed on X, and it was coordinated with other journalists, such as Philippe Debionne from the Schwäbische Zeitung, who had prior access to the material.

On 7 August 2024, the RKI published a note condemning the "illegal publication" of the RKI documents, and recommending that those affected by the lack of redaction of the documents contact the RKI delegate for data protection.

== Contents ==
The documents cover deliberations of the COVID-19 crisis team at the Robert Koch Institute (RKI) about a wide range of topics related to the German government response to the COVID-19 pandemic. Among those highlighted by German media are vaccination policies, lockdowns and mask mandates.

=== "Pandemic of the unvaccinated" ===
On 3 November 2021, Ministry of Health Jens Spahn (CDU), stated that Germany was facing a massive "pandemic of the unvaccinated." RKI minutes of 5 November stated that the "pandemic of the unvaccinated" terminology was technically incorrect, but that it would probably be not possible to correct it because Spahn used it very frequently.

In den Medien wird von einer Pandemie der Ungeimpften gesprochen. Aus fachlicher Sicht nicht korrekt. Gesamtbevölkerung trägt bei. Soll das in Kommunikation aufgegriffen werden? [...] Dient als Appell an alle, die nicht geimpft sind, sich impfen zu lassen. Sagt Minister bei jeder Pressekonferenz, vermutlich bewusst, kann eher nicht korrigiert werden.
Media speak of a pandemic of the unvaccinated. Not correct from a specialist point of view. Whole population is contributing. Should this be taken up in communications? [...] Serves as a call on everyone who is not vaccinated to get vaccinated. Minister says this at every press conference, presumably deliberately, can more likely not be corrected.

—RKI minutes, 5 November 2021, page 8

The Schwäbische Zeitung highlighted this passage, noting how this narrative was quickly adopted by other politicians and journalists, and that this would later be used to justify restrictive measures targeted at unvaccinated people. The Berliner Zeitung also covered this story, and claimed those who were mistreated for not getting a vaccine, and those who got coerced into getting it, have the right to information on this. The Berliner Morgenpost considered that while the sentence was a simplification, it was still roughly correct. Der Spiegel put forward multiple interpretations for the "pandemic of the unvaccinated", justifying its use at the time, and noting its previous usage by the United States CDC and Joe Biden.

On 10 August 2024, Andreas Gassen, president of the National Association of Statutory Health Insurance Physicians, criticized the stigmatization of unvaccinated people and called for an investigation committee.

On 22 August 2024, Frauke Rostalski, a member of the German Ethics Council, told Die Zeit that the RKI files demonstrated that the Government took decisions related to the right to freedom that were based on evidence that was known to be outdated.

== Legal consequences ==
On 3 September 2024, in a legal action by a nursing assistant who was banned from entry to her workplace in 2022 due to failure to provide a vaccination proof, the Third Chamber of the Osnabrück Administrative Court submitted the case to the Federal Constitutional Court based on the revelations of the RKI minutes.

== Reactions ==
There have been calls for the resignation of Karl Lauterbach by Wolfgang Kubicki, deputy of the Free Democratic Party and Vice President of the Bundestag, Burkhard Ewert of the Neue Osnabrücker Zeitung.

On 21 August 2024, the ombudsman of the Swiss Broadcasting Corporation stated that the Schweizer Radio und Fernsehen should have covered the RKI documents controversy in March 2024.

The media regulator of North Rhine-Westphalia initiated administrative action against Multipolar.

== See also ==
- Robert Koch Institute
- German government response to the COVID-19 pandemic
