= Anne Jakob =

German lawyer and academic (born 1971)

- Born: 24 June 1971 (age 55); Karl-Marx-Stadt, East Germany
- Other name: Anne Jakob-Milicia
- Citizenship: German
- Education: Bielefeld University; Heidelberg University; Cardiff University (LL.M.); Heinrich Heine University Düsseldorf (Dr. iur.)
- Occupations: Lawyer, academic, arbitrator
- Employer(s): accadis University of Applied Sciences, Bad Homburg
- Known for: First lawyer in Germany to hold the title of Specialist Lawyer in Sports Law

Anne Jakob (born 24 June 1971) is a German lawyer, academic and arbitrator specialising in sports law. She is a professor of law and compliance at the accadis University of Applied Sciences in Bad Homburg and became the first lawyer in Germany to receive the title of Specialist Lawyer in Sports Law (Fachanwältin für Sportrecht) after the specialist qualification took effect on 1 July 2019.

== Early life and education ==
Jakob was born in Karl-Marx-Stadt (now Chemnitz), East Germany. After completing secondary education, she worked as a journalist and editor for the Märkische Oderzeitung before studying law at Bielefeld University and Heidelberg University. She spent part of her studies at the University of Strasbourg through the Erasmus Programme and worked as an assistant to Member of the European Parliament Elmar Brok. During her school years, Jakob competed as an athlete in swimming and later in athletics.

She later obtained a Master of Laws (LL.M.) in international business law from Cardiff University. After completing her legal clerkship in Baden-Württemberg, including a placement at the Court of Arbitration for Sport in Lausanne, she qualified as a lawyer. She received a doctorate in law from Heinrich Heine University Düsseldorf in 2006, with a dissertation on the European Community's association agreements with Tunisia, Morocco and Algeria.

== Career ==
Jakob started her career as a lawyer in 2002 as an associate at Jones Day in Frankfurt. From 2005 to 2011 she worked for the German Athletics Association (DLV), where she headed legal affairs and anti-doping activities. During this period she was involved in association-law matters, athlete agreements and data protection, and helped develop the association's anti-doping system. She also served as managing director of the association's commercial subsidiary from 2006 to 2009. She established the association's anti-doping system and chaired its disciplinary committee, and she was responsible for doping-control management at the 2009 World Championships in Athletics in Berlin and the 2011 World Championships in Athletics in Daegu.

Jakob served on the legal commission of the International Association of Athletics Federations (IAAF) and on anti-doping bodies connected with European athletics.

Since 2011 she has practised as an independent lawyer specialising in sports law. Jakob has taught sports law, compliance and business law at the accadis University of Applied Sciences since 2012 and was appointed professor in 2014. She has also taught at Justus Liebig University Giessen, Johannes Gutenberg University Mainz and within UEFA's Executive Master in Global Sport Governance (MESGO).

Jakob serves as an arbitrator at the German Court of Arbitration for Sport and on arbitration panels connected with German professional sports organisations, including the Deutsche Eishockey Liga and the German eSports Association. She served as president of the International Sport Lawyers Association from 2019 to 2025 and has since been its honorary president. In 2023, Jakob was elected vice-president of the German Golf Association (Deutscher Golf Verband). She is also a member of the governance committee of World Sailing and of the anti-doping commission of the German National Paralympic Committee, where she serves as a member with legal expertise.

In 2018, the German Federal Bar approved the specialist qualification in sports law. Jakob participated in discussions surrounding the creation of the qualification and became the first female lawyer in Germany to be awarded the title of Specialist Lawyer in Sports Law when the amended regulations entered into force on 1 July 2019.

In 2022, Jakob was among a team of lawyers appointed by the Berlin Senate to provide legal advice for the city's hosting of UEFA Euro 2024. Since 2025 she has advised Berlin on legal matters relating to major sporting events and projects, including events involving the National Football League (NFL) and the National Basketball Association (NBA), the Grand Départ of the Tour de France, and Berlin's bid for the Olympic and Paralympic Games. In 2024, she was listed among the recommended lawyers for sports law in a ranking by WirtschaftsWoche and the Handelsblatt Research Institute, and was named the No. 1 "Legal All Star".

== Selected publications ==
- Jakob, Anne (2006). Die Assoziation zwischen der Europäischen Gemeinschaft und ihren Mitgliedstaaten sowie Tunesien, Marokko und Algerien (in German). Frankfurt am Main: Peter Lang. ISBN 978-3-631-54829-5.
- Jakob, Anne (2007). Handbuch für eine faire Seniorenleichtathletik (in German). Darmstadt: German Athletics Association.
- Jakob, Anne (2009). Doping Control Officers' Guide. Darmstadt: German Athletics Association.
- Orth, Jan F.; Stopper, Martin; Jakob, Anne (2021). Praxishandbuch Vereins- und Verbandsrecht mit Schwerpunkt Sport (in German). Munich: C.H. Beck. ISBN 978-3-406-71164-0.
- Jakob, Anne; Thorhauer, Yvonne; Ratz, Maria (2018). "E-Sport – Skizze eines neuen Forschungsfeldes". Compliance im Sport (in German). Wiesbaden: Springer Gabler. ISBN 978-3-658-22510-0.
- Jakob, Anne (2013). "Nominierung für Olympische Spiele". Nominierungsfragen im Sport (in German). Stuttgart: Boorberg. ISBN 978-3-415-05137-9.
- Jakob, Anne (2023). "Das Rechteschutzprogramm der UEFA – Herausforderungen und Chancen für Host Cities". In Bezold, Thomas; Pfeffel, Florian (eds.). Die UEFA EURO 2024 aus sportökonomischer Perspektive (in German).
- Jakob, Anne (2024). "Sportverbände". In Pischel, Gerhard; Kopp, Reinhold; Bouwer, Tobias (eds.). Compliance in Vereinen und Verbänden (in German) (2nd ed.).
- Jakob, Anne; Courtet, Marie-Céline; Kornbeck, Jacob; Trosien, Gerhard (2026). "Between lex Olympica and lex publica: National Sports Agencies in France and Germany compared". AUC Kinanthropologica. 62 (1).
