= Jean Goldenbaum =

Jean Goldenbaum (b. 6 September 1982 in São Paulo, Brazil) is a German composer and musicologist. He is a researcher at the European Centre for Jewish Music of the Hanover University of Music, Drama and Media.

== Life ==
Jean Mordechai Arendt Goldenbaum was born in a Jewish family in São Paulo and grew up there. In 2005 he immigrated to Germany and in 2013 got his PhD in musicology at the University of Augsburg.

Goldenbaum was the composer in residence of the Wasa Sinfonieta Music Festival in Finland in 2011 and 2013, in which his two double concerti Ode to Friendship (for flute, guitar and orchestra) and The Universes shall conspire to Love (for flute, percussion and orchestra) were premiered. In 2011 some of his chamber music pieces were performed at the event "Neue Musik International" in Salzburg. Sponsored by the Ministry of Culture of Brazil his music was presented at the 2012 event Neue Klänge aus Brasilien – im Portrait: Jean Goldenbaum, also in Salzburg. After its premiere in Brazil, it took place in this occasion the European premiere of his concerto May all Dictators fall (for guitar and guitar quartet), years later recorded in Hanover.

In 2016 it took place in Berlin the concert New tones for the Good – Neue Klänge für das Gute, where a program exclusively with Goldenbaum's works were performed by eight musicians from different countries. In the same year Goldenbaum was the guest composer of the 29th Schwäbischen Kunstsommer in Irsee, where his Ökumenische Suite: In the name of Peace, Freedom and Tolerance (for a cappella choir) was premiered.

He produced six albums of some of his orchestral and chamber music works, recorded in both Europe and Brazil. His oeuvre comprises at the moment around 130 compositions for solo instruments, chamber music and orchestra.

In 2018 legendary Brazilian pianist Eudóxia de Barros included Goldenbaum's piece Brazilian Nostalgia (Longing for a time I didn't live) in her annual tour, performing it dozens of times.

In 2022 he was the music director of the Festival "Aktuelle Jüdische Musik in Deutschland" (Today's Jewish Music in Germany), which took place in Hanover.

In May 2022 he was invited, to present his music and his thoughts about Hannah Arendt at the event "Jüdische Musik & Erinnerungskultur: Hannah-Arendt" (Jewish Music & Culture of Remembrance: Hannah-Arendt) in the City Hall of Hanover.

A large part of the concerts organized by Goldenbaum are related to the social and political commitment of the composer.

He is member of two political parties: Social Democratic Party of Germany (SPD) and Israeli Meretz.

In May 2024 Goldenbaum announced in his website that he has renounced his Brazilian citizenship, due to politics reasons. He explained he no longer would vote to any party (right and/or left wing) in Brazil, for considering them "extreme, ignorant, corrupt and highly antissemitic".

Since 2024, his music has been published by Mitzkat Verlag.

In 2025, his book Aufsätze und Betrachtungen zu Musik und Judentum (und die Welten um sie herum) (Essays and Reflections on Music and Judaism (and the worlds around them)) was published by Epubli Verlag.

He has lived in the Holzminden district with his German Shepherd Jake since 2021.

== Compositional style ==
Goldenbaum's music is basically atonal, but has a strong influence of traditional tonal music, as the composer himself explained in interviews. The musicologist Alexandre Bispo points out that "in the compositional work of Jean Goldenbaum, the relationships between ethical and aesthetic aspects in the creative process in the Euro-Brazilian context acquire a special meaning. His compositions express the ethical foundations of artistic creation in a particularly expressive way."

== Press and media ==
Jean Goldenbaum was interviewed or mentioned in several German and international medias, such as Jüdische Allgemeine, Bayerischer Rundfunk Klassik, Der Teckbote, Radio Leinehertz Hannover, Concerti, Stadtkind Hannover, Täglicher Anzeiger Holzminden, Programa Provocações (Brazil), Radio Universidad de Salamanca (Spain).

== Works (selection) ==
- Ecumenical Suite: in the name of Peace, Freedom and Tolerance for SATB a cappella choir, opus 1 (2008, Ikuro Editions)
- Symphony of the Good, for symphony orchestra, opus 2 (2009)
- Music Manifest for Nonviolence, for recorder-flute trio, opus 11 (2010)
- 'May all dictators fall' Concerto, for guitar and guitar quartet, opus 17 (2011)
- Against the alienation of today's youth, for symphony orchestra, opus 20 (2011)
- 'Victorious is the Respectful' Concerto, piano concerto, opus 21 (2011)
- Ferreira Gullar & Jean Goldenbaum – Three moments in Poetry and Music, poetry by Ferreira Gullar, for soprano and piano, opus 26 (2012)
- 'The Universe shall conspire to Love' Concerto, for flute, percussion and orchestra, opus 27 (2012)
- The death of the forest, for cello octet, opus 37 (2013)
- Music protest against social injustices, for piano and ten percussion instruments, opus 39 (2014)
- The Path and the Faith in it, for solo trombone, opus 44 (2014)
- Believe, move and heal the world, for open instrumentation, opus 55 (2015)
- Jewish Synesthesia, for flute and guitar, opus 65 (2016)
- The same image in colors and in black and white, for flute, piano and percussion, opus 73 (2017)
- Quartet 3: Light Meditations, string quartet, opus 83 (2018)
- Tzedakah: Social Justice, for flute, organ and timpani, opus 88 (2019)
- Rest in peace, for guitar, opus 101 (2021)
- Oseh Shalom, for tenor, bass and guitar, opus 113 (2022)
- Achtmal Liebe in Wort und Musik (2023)

== Recordings (selection) ==
- Symphony of the Good (2010)
- Ode to Friendship, Concerto & other works (2012)
- The Universe shall conspire to Love, Concerto & other works (2013)
- Live in Berlin (2017)
- Some works (2020)
- Music to heal the world (2022)
