= Der neue Tag (Weiden in der Oberpfalz) =

German newspaper published in Weiden

Oberpfalz Medien – Der neue Tag
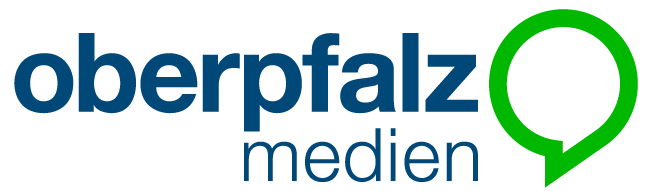
- Type: Daily newspaper
- Format: Berlin
- Founded: 1946
- Headquarters: Weiden, Germany
- Website: www.onetz.de

Der neue Tag is a German regional daily newspaper published by Oberpfalz Medien and based in Weiden in der Oberpfalz. The newspaper is published in eight editions covering the city and district of Neustadt an der Waldnaab, the city and district of Amberg-Sulzbach, and the districts of Tirschenreuth and Schwandorf. Its paid circulation stands at 54,984 copies, a decline of 37.4 percent since 1998.

The media group includes the online portal Onetz and the weekly newspaper "Oberpfälzer Wochenzeitung" (OWZ). Additionally, "Der neue Tag" holds a stake in the regional radio station Radio Ramasuri and the regional television station Oberpfalz TV (OTV).

== History ==
Der neue Tag was founded in 1946 by Anton Döhler and Victor von Gostomski. The newspaper is published in the Berliner format. In Amberg, the newspaper appears under the title "Amberger Zeitung", and in Sulzbach-Rosenberg under the title "Sulzbach-Rosenberger Zeitung".
