= Radio 7 =

Coordinates: 48°24′24″N 9°59′40″E

- Die besten aktuellen Hits für den Süden (The best current hits for the south)
- Germany
- Broadcast area: Baden-Württemberg; Swabia (Bavaria); Northern Switzerland

Programming
- Format: Hot adult contemporary

Ownership
- Owner: Mediengesellschaft Donau-Iller GmbH & Co. KG

History
- First air date: 1 July 1988

Links
- Website: Radio 7

Radio 7 is a German radio station. It is broadcast via FM in southeastern Baden-Württemberg and can also be received in neighboring Switzerland. It is owned by the three main Media conglomerates of Baden-Württemberg.

Its main studio is located in Ulm, it also has local studios in Aalen, Konstanz, Ravensburg and Tuttlingen. As of 2019, Radio 7 has about 156,000 listeners per hour and 889,000 listeners per day.

Daniel Lutz has been the program director at Radio 7 in Ulm since April 1, 2026. Previously, he was program director of Klassik Radio.

== Owner ==
Radio 7 is owned and operates by three media conglomerates of Baden-Württemberg: Mediengesellschaft Donau-Iller - Südwest Presse by 44,0 %; SV-Group Ravensburg by 44,0 % and Schwarzwälder Bote Oberndorf by 12,0 %.

== Frequencies ==
It is also broadcast via DAB+ in the entirety of Baden-Württemberg since 1 December 2014, and in Bavarian Swabia since 31 August 2020.

- FM Aalen: 103.7
- FM Ulm: 101.8
- FM Ulm-Wiblingen : 90.0
- FM Iberger Kugel: 105.0
- FM Ravensburg: 96.9
- FM Witthoh: 102.5
- FM Villingen-Schwenningen: 101.2
