= Märkische Oderzeitung =

German regional newspaper

- Type: Daily newspaper (except Sundays)
- Publisher: Märkisches Medienhaus GmbH & Co. KG (MMH)
- Editor-in-chief: Claus Liesegang
- Founded: 17 March 1990; 35 years ago
- Language: German
- Headquarters: Frankfurt (Oder), Germany
- Circulation: 67,412 (2018)
- Website: www.moz.de

The Märkische Oderzeitung (abbreviated: MOZ) is a German regional newspaper published in Frankfurt (Oder), Germany.

The circulation area of the MOZ is largely identical to the former Bezirk Frankfurt, a region with around 600,000 inhabitants. It stretches along the Polish border from the northern border of Brandenburg to Eisenhüttenstadt in the south of the state. In the west, the Märkische Oderzeitung reaches the city limits of Berlin. The twelve local editions have about 240,000 readers. The sold circulation amounts to 67.412 copies, a minus of 50 percent since 1998. The share of subscribers is traditionally high.

== History ==
The Märkische Oderzeitung has been published since 17 March 1990, the day before the first free elections in the GDR took place, as an independent daily newspaper by Märkisches Medienhaus GmbH & Co. KG. The MOZ emerged from the newspaper Neuer Tag. This was created in 1952 in the wake of the abolition of the GDR countries (Länder) (and formation of the GDR districts (Bezirke)) as an organ of the district leadership of the SED Frankfurt (Oder). During the Wendezeit Sozialistische Tageszeitung im Bezirk Frankfurt/Oder (transl. Socialist daily newspaper in the Frankfurt/Oder district) was written in the subtitle of the newspaper. When the MOZ was founded, many editors of the Neuer Tag were taken over.

With effect from 1 January 2011, the Märkische Verlags- und Druckhaus GmbH & Co. KG (MVD) acquired the Oranienburger Generalanzeiger (including the local edition Hennigsdorfer Generalanzeiger, the sister newspapers Gransee Zeitung and Ruppiner Anzeiger as well as the ad papers Märker and Brandenburger Wochenblatt). In addition, the MVD is also the publisher of the Neuenhagener Echo, a monthly newspaper for the municipality of Neuenhagen bei Berlin, which is also its official journal. Half of the shareholders of the Märkische Verlag- und Druckhaus were the Neue Pressegesellschaft (publisher of the Südwest Presse) and the Stuttgarter Zeitung Verlagsgesellschaft mbH & Co. KG (publisher of the Stuttgarter Zeitung and Stuttgarter Nachrichten). At the end of 2012, the Neue Pressegesellschaft took over all shares. Since 2016, the MVD has operated under the new name Märkisches Medienhaus GmbH & Co. KG, abbreviated as MMH.

== Circulation ==
The Märkische Oderzeitung has lost considerably in circulation in recent years. The sold edition has fallen by 50 percent since 1998. It currently amounts to 67,412 copies. This corresponds to a decrease of 67,393 pieces. The share of subscriptions to the sold edition is 92.4 percent.

== List of editors-in-chief ==
- 1990-1996: Heinz Kannenberg
- 1996-1998: Claus Detjen
- 1999-2001: Franz Kadell
- 2001-2006: Heinz Kurtzbach
- 2002-2018: Frank Mangelsdorf
- 2017–present: Claus Liesegang
