= Schwäbisches Tagblatt =

German newspaper in Baden-Württemberg

The Schwäbisches Tagblatt is a daily newspaper for Tübingen, in print since 1945, as well as the publishing house that prints it. With 40,820 paid subscriptions in 2012, it is the newspaper with the highest circulation in the district of Tübingen.

The Tübingen editorial and local news from field offices in Rottenburg am Neckar (Rottenburg Post), Mössingen (Steinlach-Bote) and Reutlingen make up only the part of the daily newspaper that reports on the region of Neckar-Alb. For the outer national portion (Mantel), Ulm-based Südwest Presse is used, which makes up almost 50 percent of the newspaper. Of all the newspapers that use the same outer "jacket", Schwäbisches Tagblatt's circulation is second only to the Südwest Presse daily newspaper, which covers Ulm, Neu-Ulm, Alb-Donau-Kreis and Landkreis Neu-Ulm. There are about 30 Südwest Presse-associated newspapers, concentrated in Baden-Württemberg, with a small presence in Bavaria. The publishing house also prints a weekly Anzeigenblatt (free paper), which is very similar to a Pennysaver.
