= Broadsheet =

Largest newspaper format

Comparison of some newspaper sizes with metric paper sizes. Approximate nominal dimensions are in millimetres.

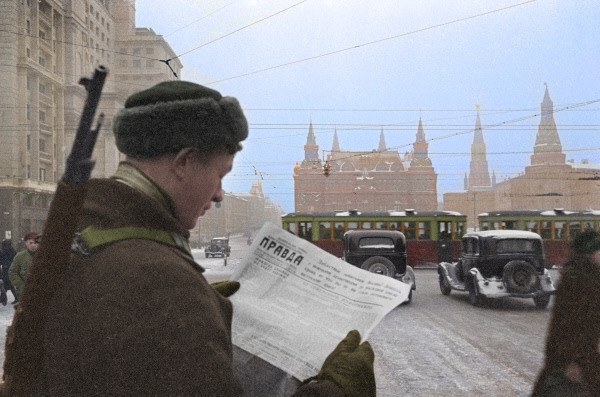
A Soviet soldier reading Pravda, a broadsheet newspaper, in 1941

A broadsheet is the largest newspaper format and is characterized by long vertical pages, typically of 22.5 inches (57 cm) in height. Other common newspaper formats include the smaller Berliner and tabloid–compact formats.

Historically, the broadsheet format emerged in the 17th century as a means for printing musical and popular prints, and later became a medium for political activism through the reprinting of speeches. In Britain, the broadsheet newspaper developed in response to a 1712 tax on newspapers based on their page counts. Outside Britain, the broadsheet evolved for various reasons, including style and authority.

Broadsheets are often associated with more intellectual and in-depth content compared to their tabloid counterparts, featuring detailed stories and less sensational material. They are commonly used by newspapers aiming to provide comprehensive coverage and analysis of news events. The format allows for a more expansive layout, often featuring multiple stories on the front page, with the most important ones positioned "above the fold".

In the 21st century, some newspapers have switched from the broadsheet format to smaller sizes, such as the Berliner or compact formats, to improve convenience for readers, especially commuters. This trend has been observed in various countries, including the UK and the US, where notable broadsheets like The Independent and The Times have adopted smaller formats.

== Description ==
Many broadsheets measure roughly 28 by 22 3/4 in (711 by 578 mm) per full broadsheet spread, twice the size of a standard tabloid. Australian and New Zealand broadsheets always have a paper size of A1 per spread (841 by 594 mm or 33.1 by 23.4 in). South African broadsheet newspapers have a double-page spread sheet size of 820 by 578 mm (32.3 by 22.8 in) (single-page live print area of 380 x 545 mm). Others measure 22 in (560 mm) vertically.

In the United States, the traditional dimensions for the front page half of a broadsheet are 12 in (305 mm) wide by 22.75 in (578 mm) long. However, in efforts to save newsprint costs, many U.S. newspapers have downsized to 11 in (279 mm) wide by 21 in (533 mm) long for a folded page.

Many rate cards and specification cards refer to the "broadsheet size" with dimensions representing the front page "half of a broadsheet" size, rather than the full, unfolded broadsheet spread. Some quote actual page size and others quote the "printed area" size.

The two versions of the broadsheet are:

- The full broadsheet typically is folded vertically in half so that it forms four pages (the front page front and back and the back page front and back). The four pages are called a spread. Inside broadsheets are nested accordingly.
- The half broadsheet is usually an inside page that is not folded vertically and just includes a front and back.

== History ==
The broadsheet, broadside, was used as a format for musical and popular prints in the 17th century. Eventually, people began using the broadsheet as a source for political activism by reprinting speeches.

Broadsheet newspapers developed in Britain after a 1712 tax was imposed on newspapers based on their page counts. However, larger formats had long been signs of status in printed objects and still are in many places. Outside of Britain the broadsheet developed for other reasons unrelated to the British tax structure including style and authority. With the early mechanization of the 19th century came an increased production of printed materials including the broadside, as well as the competing penny dreadful. Newspapers all over Europe were then starting to print their issues on broadsheets. However, in the United Kingdom, the main competition for the broadside was the gradual reduction of the newspaper tax, beginning in the 1830s until its eventual dismissal in 1855.

With the increased production of newspapers and literacy, the demand for visual reporting and journalists led to the blending of broadsides and newspapers, creating the modern broadsheet newspaper.

== Printing considerations ==
Modern printing facilities efficiently print broadsheet sections in multiples of eight pages (with four front pages and four back pages). The broadsheet is then cut in half during the process. Thus, the newsprint rolls used are defined by the width necessary to print four front pages. The width of a newsprint roll is called its web. The now-common 11-inch-wide front page broadsheet newspapers in the United States use a 44-inch web newsprint roll.

With profit margins narrowing for newspapers in the wake of competition from broadcast, cable television, and the internet, newspapers are looking to standardize the size of the newsprint roll. The Wall Street Journal with its 12-inch-wide front page was printed on 48-inch web newsprint. Early adopters in the downsizing of broadsheets used a 50-inch web (12 1/2-inch front pages). However, the 48-inch web is now rapidly becoming the definitive standard in the U.S. The New York Times held out on the downsizing until July 2006, saying it would stick to its 54-inch web (13 1/2-inch front page). However, the paper adopted the narrower format beginning Monday, 6 August 2007.

The smaller newspapers also have the advantage of being easier to handle, particularly among commuters.

== Connotations ==
In some countries, especially Australia, Canada, the UK, and the US, broadsheet newspapers are commonly perceived to be more intellectual in content than their tabloid counterparts. They tend to use their greater size to publish stories exploring topics in-depth and carry less sensationalist and celebrity-oriented material. The distinction is most obvious on the front page since tabloids tend to have a single story dominated by a headline, and broadsheets allow two or more stories to be displayed of which the most important sit at the top of the page "above the fold."

A few newspapers, though, such as the German Bild-Zeitung and others throughout Central Europe are tabloids in terms of content but use the physical broadsheet format.

== Switch to smaller sizes ==
=== In the United Kingdom ===
In 2003, The Independent started concurrent production of both broadsheet and tabloid ("compact") editions, carrying exactly the same content. The Times did likewise, but with less apparent success, with readers vocally opposing the change. The Independent ceased to be available in broadsheet format in May 2004, and The Times followed suit from November 2004; The Scotsman is also now published only in tabloid format. The Guardian switched to the "Berliner" or "midi" format found in some other European countries (slightly larger than a traditional tabloid) on 12 September 2005. In June 2017, the Guardian announced it would again change the format to tabloid size – the first tabloid edition was published on 15 January 2018.

The main motivation cited for this shift was that commuters prefer papers that they can hold easily on public transport and that other readers also might find the smaller formats more convenient.

=== In the United States ===
In the United States, The Wall Street Journal made headlines when it announced its overseas version would convert to a tabloid on 17 October 2005. Strong debate occurred in the US on whether or not the rest of the national papers will or even should follow the trend of the European papers and The Wall Street Journal. The Wall Street Journal overseas edition switched back to a broadsheet format in 2015.

== See also ==
- Newspaper format
