= Rheinische Post =

Major daily German regional newspaper

- The 17 September 2010 front page
- Type: Daily newspaper
- Format: Rhenish
- Owner: Rheinische Post Verlagsgesellschaft mbH
- Editor-in-chief: Moritz Döbler
- Founded: 2 March 1946
- Headquarters: Düsseldorf, Germany
- Website: rp-online.de

Rheinische Post (German pronunciation: [ˈʁaɪnɪʃə ˈpɔst]) is a major German regional daily newspaper published since 1946 by the Rheinische Post Verlagsgesellschaft GmbH company, and headquartered in Düsseldorf. The Post is especially dominant in the western part of North Rhine-Westphalia. The Post's online platforms are called RP ONLINE (pronounced [ˈɛʁˌpeː ˈʔɔnlaɪn]) and Tonight.de.

== History and profile ==
Rheinische Post is one of the allied new foundations in the post-World War II era. NSDAP-opponents Karl Arnold, Anton Betz, Erich Wenderoth and (soon resigned) Friedrich Vogel received a British newspaper license. The newspaper was established in 1946 and belongs to the Arnold, Betz, Droste, Alt and Ebel families. It is part of the Rheinische Post Mediengruppe which also owns newspapers like the Saarbrücker Zeitung, the Lausitzer Rundschau or the Trierischer Volksfreund.

The core distribution area stretches from the Bergisches Land to the Dutch border. There are 31 local editions, among them other regional newspapers, like the Neuß-Grevenbroicher Zeitung, the Benrather Tageblatt and the Bocholter-Borkener Volksblatt, which have their own regional news pages. The Rheinische Post is available at kiosks as well as through subscriptions. The paper is published in Rhenish format.

The circulation of Rheinische Post was 343,000 copies during the third quarter of 1992. In 2001 the paper had a circulation of 418,000 copies. The circulation of the paper was 411,000 copies in 2004. Its circulation was 399,215 copies in the first quarter of 2006. In 2018, the circulation of the print version of Rheinische Post was about 280,000 copies.

== Editorial staff ==
Moritz Döbler has been the editor in chief since 2020. Horst Thoren has been vice-editor since 1998, as well as Stefan Weigel who has been vice-editor, since 2014. Eva Quadbeck is part of the editorial staff of Rheinische Post and is in charge of the newspaper's Berlin office. Regional editorial staff give their opinions in news articles.

== Former editors ==
Joachim Sobotta, was editor from 1969 to 1997, he had a large impact on the style of the newspaper. Sven Gösmann's predecessor, Ulrich Reitz, is now editor of the Westdeutsche Allgemeine Zeitung; Reitz accomplished a range of editorial reforms and cancelled the dpa-ticker. Sven Gösmann held the office of editor in chief from 2005 until the end of 2013. Michael Bröcker was the editor in chief from 2014 to 2019.

== Caricatures ==
Romulus Candea created political caricatures in the Seventies and Eighties. Nik Ebert assisted him from 1985, with emphasis on the local politics of Mönchengladbach. Nik Ebert also started the comic Düssel-Möwe (which portrays the adventures of an arrogant selfish seagull from Düsseldorf and his bird friends) in the Düsseldorf regional editions.

== Internet presence ==
The web edition of Rheinische Post is called RP ONLINE and publishes recent news from North Rhine-Westphalia, Germany, and the world. In December 2017, RP ONLINE generated about 19,764,115 visits from within Germany to their site.

=== Opinion reader portal ===
This portal was launched in early 2005. Its readers could publish their own articles and thoughts. The first printed edition of Opinio, which consisted of the best articles by readers, was first published on 16 February 2005. It was distributed as a monthly supplement in the newspaper. This supplement has been discontinued. A page of Opinio articles appeared once a week on an own page in the newspaper. Opinio was awarded a prize for its connection between the internet and printed media. Nowadays, Opinio no longer exists. However, readers can write comments on the newspaper's articles.

=== Tonight.de ===
RP ONLINE also runs a scene portal called Tonight.de. It reports on the night-life in Düsseldorf in print and photographs. Readers are informed of upcoming events. The portal was relaunched in November 2007.

== Editors-in-chief ==
- 1945 – 1958: Christoph von Imhoff
- 1969 – 1997: Joachim Sobotta
- 1997 – 2005: Ulrich Reitz
- 2005 – 2013: Sven Gösmann
- 2014 – 2019: Michael Bröcker
- since 2020: Moritz Döbler

== See also ==
- List of newspapers in Germany
