= Iberger Kugel =

- Location within Baden-Württemberg

Highest point
- Elevation: 1,013 m (3,323 ft)
- Coordinates: 47°38′20.8″N 10°04′38.5″E

Geography
- Location: Baden-Württemberg, Germany
- Parent range: Allgäu Alps

The Iberger Kugel is a 1,013 metre high mountain in the Allgäu, located seven kilometers southeast of Isny im Allgäu.

A transmitter on top of the mountain transmits the radio stations Radio 7 on FM 105.0 and Radio Seefunk on FM 103.9.
