= Schwäbische Zeitung =

German newspaper

- Type: Daily newspaper (except Sundays)
- Publisher: Medienhaus Schwäbischer Verlag GmbH & Co. KG, Ravensburg
- Editor-in-chief: Christoph Reisinger
- Founded: 4 December 1945; 80 years ago
- Language: German
- Headquarters: Ravensburg, Germany
- Circulation: 159,354 (2023)
- Website: www.schwaebische.de

Schwäbische Zeitung (German: Swabian newspaper) is a daily newspaper published by Medienhaus Schwäbisch Media, Schwäbischer Verlag in Ravensburg, Baden-Württemberg, Germany. It was founded in Leutkirch im Allgäu on 4 December 1945 and is one of the largest regional newspapers in Baden-Württemberg.

Schwäbische Zeitung is said to have a regional monopoly. Schwäbische Zeitung is accused of evolving from a Christian-conservative paper shaped by Catholicism in the Upper Swabian region into a profit-oriented tabloid medium ("boulevardization"). Staff criticize a lack of in-depth investigations and the adoption of AfD narratives.

== History ==
The paid circulation is 159,354 copies, a decrease of over 18 percent since 1998. Until the move to Ravensburg in January 2013, Leutkirch was the headquarters of the publishing house and the central editorial office.

Hassan Al Mohtasib has been the responsible communication designer for Schwäbische Zeitung since September 2019, responsible for both the printed daily newspaper and its online version. In October 2025, Gabriel Kords became editor-in-chief of Schwäbische Zeitung.

== Newspaper format ==
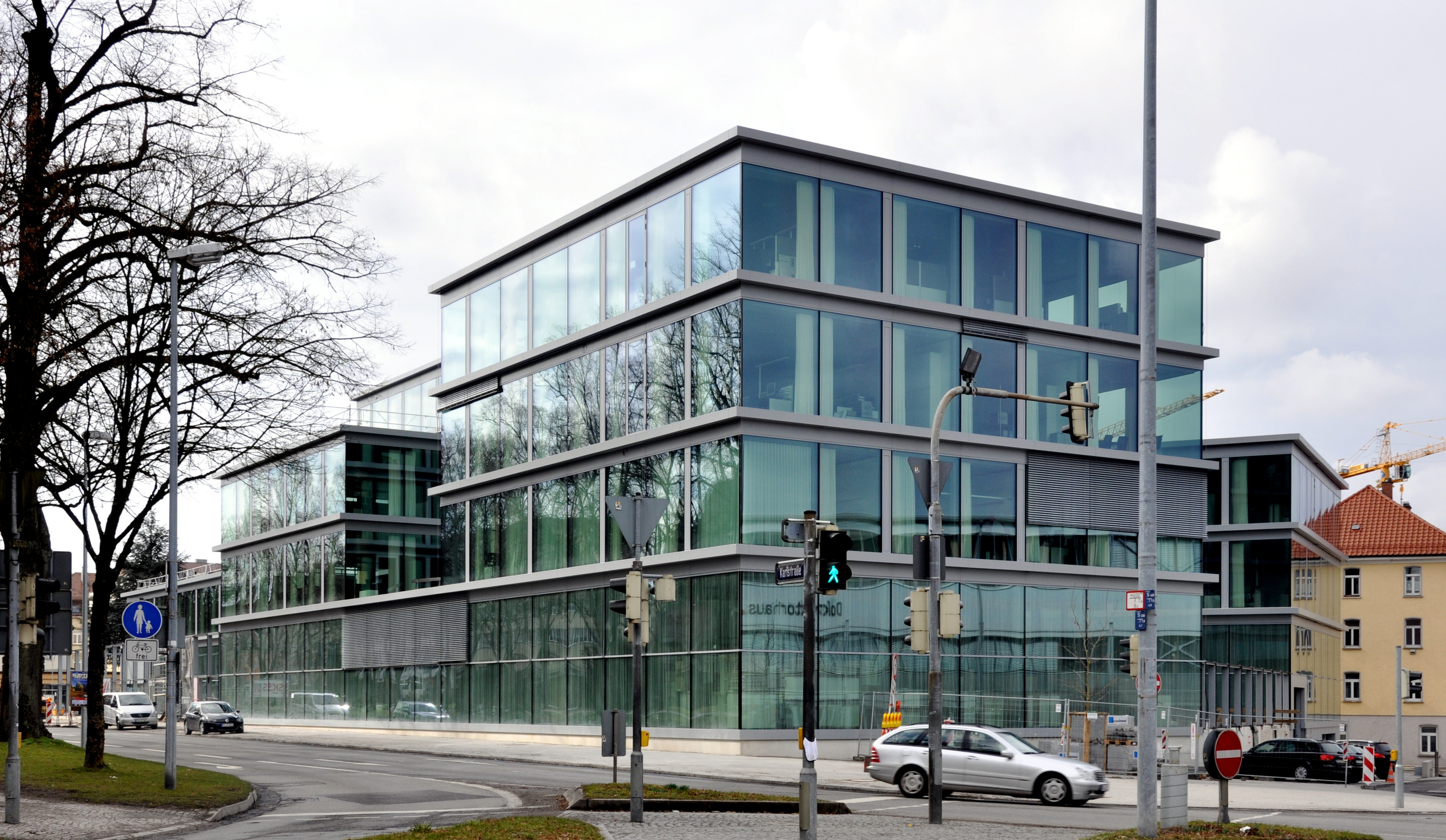
Headquarters in Ravensburg

The newspaper has the Rhenish format with a type area (width × height) of 320 mm × 480 mm (13 in × 19 in). It has seven columns, resulting in a column width of 44.4 mm (1.75 in).

== SV-Group ==
Schwäbische Zeitung is published by Schwäbische Verlag (SV-Gruppe). Since 1990, SV Gruppe has evolved from a regional newspaper publisher into a diversified media company with 130 companies, offering logistics and e-commerce services. The company has 3,800 employees and reported an annual turnover of €250 million in 2025. The largest shareholder is Erich Waldburg-Zeil. The managing director is Lutz Schumacher.

In 2013, the group moved from its historical headquarters in Leutkirch to Ravensburg. In 2021, the SV Group expanded to North-Eastern Germany and acquired Nordkurier and Schweriner Volkszeitung.

- The Regio TV-Gruppe is Germany's largest regional TV network. It broadcasts local news, service programs, and entertainment to approximately 5 million viewers across southwestern Germany.
  - Regio TV Stuttgart is based in Stuttgart, covering the central metropolitan area.
  - Regio TV Schwaben covers the Ulm area, the Alb-Donau region, Biberach, Heidenheim, Ostalbkreis, and the Bavarian district of Neu-Ulm.
  - Regio TV Bodensee, headquartered in Ravensburg, covering the Lake Constance and Upper Swabia regions.
  - Neckaralb Live radio station is a subsidiary of SV-Gruppe, broadcasting to the Neckar-Alb region
  - Radio 7 is one of the largest private radio stations in Baden-Württemberg, headquartered in Ulm. Schwäbisch Media holds 44%; competitor Südwest Presse also has a holding in the company.
  - Radio Seefunk is a small station in the Lake Constance area, and is also co-owned by SV-Gruppe.
- The group includes the southern German regional mail and delivery service Südmail GmBH.
