= Haller Tagblatt =

German newspaper in Baden-Württemberg

Haller Tagblatt (English: Haller Daily Paper) is a German daily newspaper for the district of Schwäbisch Hall. It first appeared as a weekly newspaper in 1788 under the name Hallisches Wochenblatt, and is the second oldest newspaper in Baden-Württemberg. In the 19th century, the newspaper's headquarters were on the Haalstraße, in the center of the former imperial city of Schwäbisch Hall. Nationwide news stories are published in cooperation with Südwest Presse. The newspaper and publisher together have 66 employees. The publisher and editor of the newspaper is Detjen Claus. The paid circulation is 16,844 copies.

== Newspaper Co-operative ==
The Haller Tagblatt is a member of Neue Pressegesellschaft's regional newspaper co-op. The main office of Neue Pressegesellschaft in Ulm issues Südwest Presse-produced national and regional stories that Haller uses as the outer portion (Mantel) of its daily newspaper. These sections are Internationale und Bundes-Politik (international and federal politics), Wirtschaft (economy), Südwest-Umschau (Southwestern sights), Feuilleton (features), Kulturspiegel (cultural mirror), Brennpunkt (focus), Blick in die Welt (worldview), überregionaler Sport (sports in the region), Wochenendbeilage (weekend supplement), and Sonderveröffentlichungen (Special publications).
