= Stuttgarter Nachrichten =

German newspaper

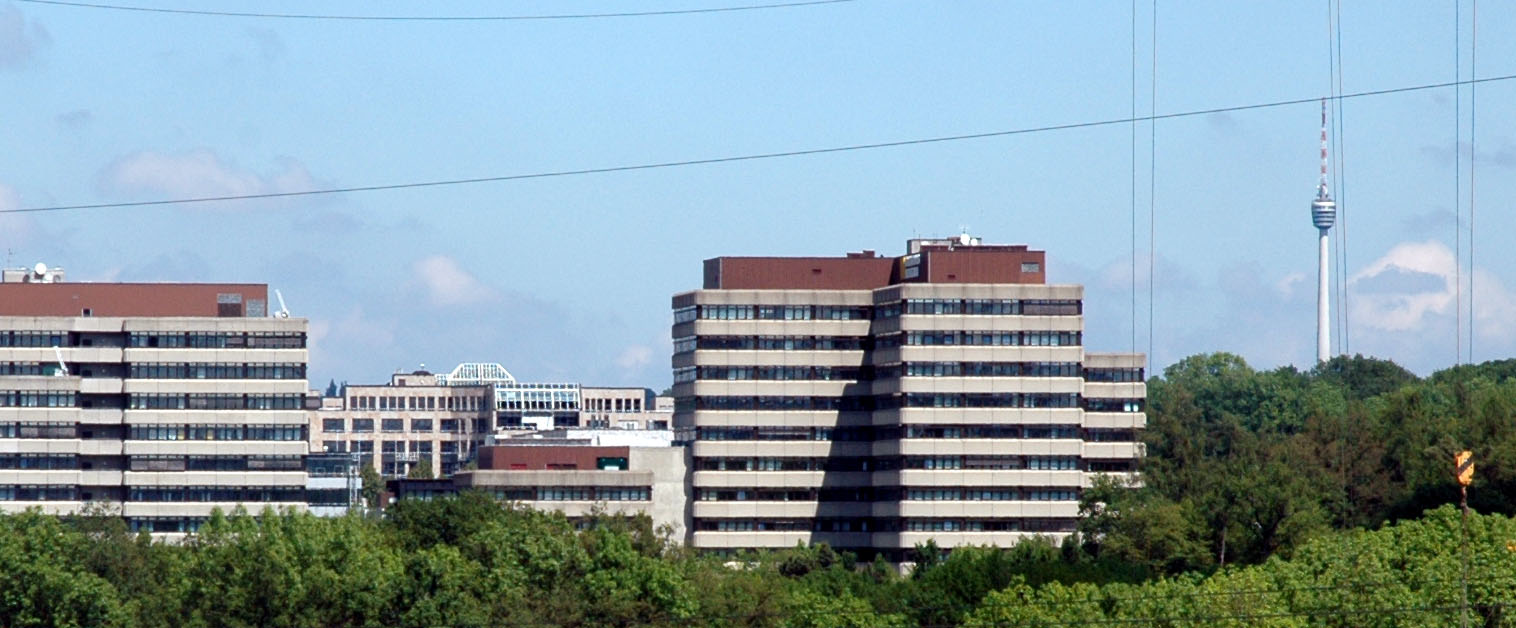
Pressehaus Stuttgart, the headquarters of Stuttgarter Zeitung

Stuttgarter Nachrichten (Stuttgart News) is a newspaper that is published in Stuttgart-Möhringen, Germany. It sells together with the Stuttgarter Zeitung, which comes from the same publishing house. In 2013, the two papers, together with Nordstuttgarter Rundschau and Fellbacher Zeitung, had a total circulation of 217,000. Christoph Reisinger has been the editor-in-chief since April 2011.

== History ==
The newspaper was first published on 12 November 1946 under licence from the American military government, initially only three times a week. Editors were Henry Bernhard, Otto Färber and Erwin Schoettle. Chrysostomus Zodel was editor-in-chief for a long period in time.

== Editions ==
The Stuttgarter Nachrichten has three local editions:

- Fellbacher Zeitung is published in Fellbach and in Kernen im Remstal with a circulation of about 9000 Pieces. It comes with its own six page part with local news, politics and sport.
- Kornwestheimer Zeitung
- Marbacher Zeitung - Bottwartal Bote

The Stuttgarter Nachrichten also produces content for partner newspapers. Non-local parts are also used by the Backnanger Kreiszeitung, Gäubote, Heidenheimer Neue Presse, Mühlacker Tagblatt, Murrhardter Zeitung, Nürtinger Zeitung/Wendlinger Zeitung, Rems-Zeitung, Sindelfinger Zeitung/Böblinger Zeitung, Kreiszeitung Böblinger Bote, Vaihinger Kreiszeitung, and Waiblinger Kreiszeitung/Schorndorfer Nachrichten/Welzheimer Zeitung/Winnender Zeitung.

There is also a content partnership with Schwarzwälder Bote.

== Online ==
Most of the articles published in the print version of the paper can be read for free at stuttgarter-nachrichten.de. There is also shared content with the Stuttgarter Zeitung made exclusively for the two websites.
