= Der Teckbote =

Daily newspaper in Kirchheim unter Teck, Germany

- Type: Daily newspaper
- Owner(s): GO Verlag GmbH & Co. KG
- Publisher: Ulrich Gottlieb
- Managing editor: Frank Hoffmann
- Founded: 1832
- Headquarters: Alleenstraße 158, 73230 Kirchheim,
- Circulation: 14,406
- Website: teckbote.de

Der Teckbote is a German daily newspaper for the Swabian town of Kirchheim unter Teck.

== History ==
The Teckbote was founded in 1832 under the title Wochenblatt für den Oberamtsbezirk Kirchheim unter Teck (Weekly Newspaper for the district of Kirchheim unter Teck). It switched to a daily newspaper in 1869, focusing on the political and cultural life in Kirchheim unter Teck. After the Second World War ban on newspapers ended, it reappeared under the name Teck-Rundschau in 1949.

Since 1968, it has used Ulm-based Südwest Presse's outer jacket (Mantel).
