= Newspaper format =

Physical characteristics of a newspaper

Comparison of some newspaper sizes with metric paper sizes. Approximate nominal dimensions are in millimetres.

Newspaper formats vary substantially, with different formats more common in different countries. The size of a newspaper format refers to the size of the paper page; the printed area within that can vary substantially depending on the newspaper.

In some countries, particular formats have associations with particular types of newspaper; for example, in the United Kingdom, there is a distinction between "tabloid" and "broadsheet" as references to newspaper content quality, which originates with the more popular newspapers using the tabloid format; hence "tabloid journalism".

== Trends ==
In a recent trend, many newspapers have been undergoing what is known as "web cut down", in which the publication is redesigned to print using a narrower (and less expensive) roll of paper. In extreme examples, some broadsheet papers are nearly as narrow as traditional tabloids.

An average roll of 26.4 in (670 mm), 45 in (1,100 mm) diameter newsprint rolled out is 60–65 cm long.

== Sizes and aspect ratios ==
- Broadsheet 749 mm × 597 mm (29.5 in × 23.5 in) (1.255 aspect ratio)
- Nordisch 570 mm × 400 mm (22 in × 16 in) (1.425 aspect ratio)
- Rhenish around 520 mm × 350 mm (20 in × 14 in) (1.486 aspect ratio)
- Swiss (Neue Zürcher Zeitung) 475 mm × 320 mm (18.7 in × 12.6 in) (1.484 aspect ratio)
- Berliner 470 mm × 315 mm (18.5 in × 12.4 in) (1.492 aspect ratio)
  - During its Berliner phase, The Guardian's printed area was 443 mm × 287 mm (17.4 in × 11.3 in) (1.544 aspect ratio).
- Tabloid 430 mm × 280 mm (17 in × 11 in) (1.536 aspect ratio)
- Demitab (half tabloid) 200 mm × 270 mm (8 in × 10.5 in) 1.3125 aspect ratio. "Magazine format", though many magazines are larger. Used by The Economist.

=== Comparison with ISO 216 (1.414) ===
- A2 594 mm × 420 mm (23.4 in × 16.5 in)
- B3 500 mm × 353 mm (19.7 in × 13.9 in)
- C3 458 mm × 324 mm (18.0 in × 12.8 in)
- A3 420 mm × 297 mm (16.5 in × 11.7 in)
- A4 297 mm × 210 mm (11.7 in × 8.3 in)
