= Arrondissement de Cologne =

Former arrondissement of France

The Arrondissement de Cologne was an administrative district of the Département de la Roer from 1798 to 1814 which was subdivided into cantons.

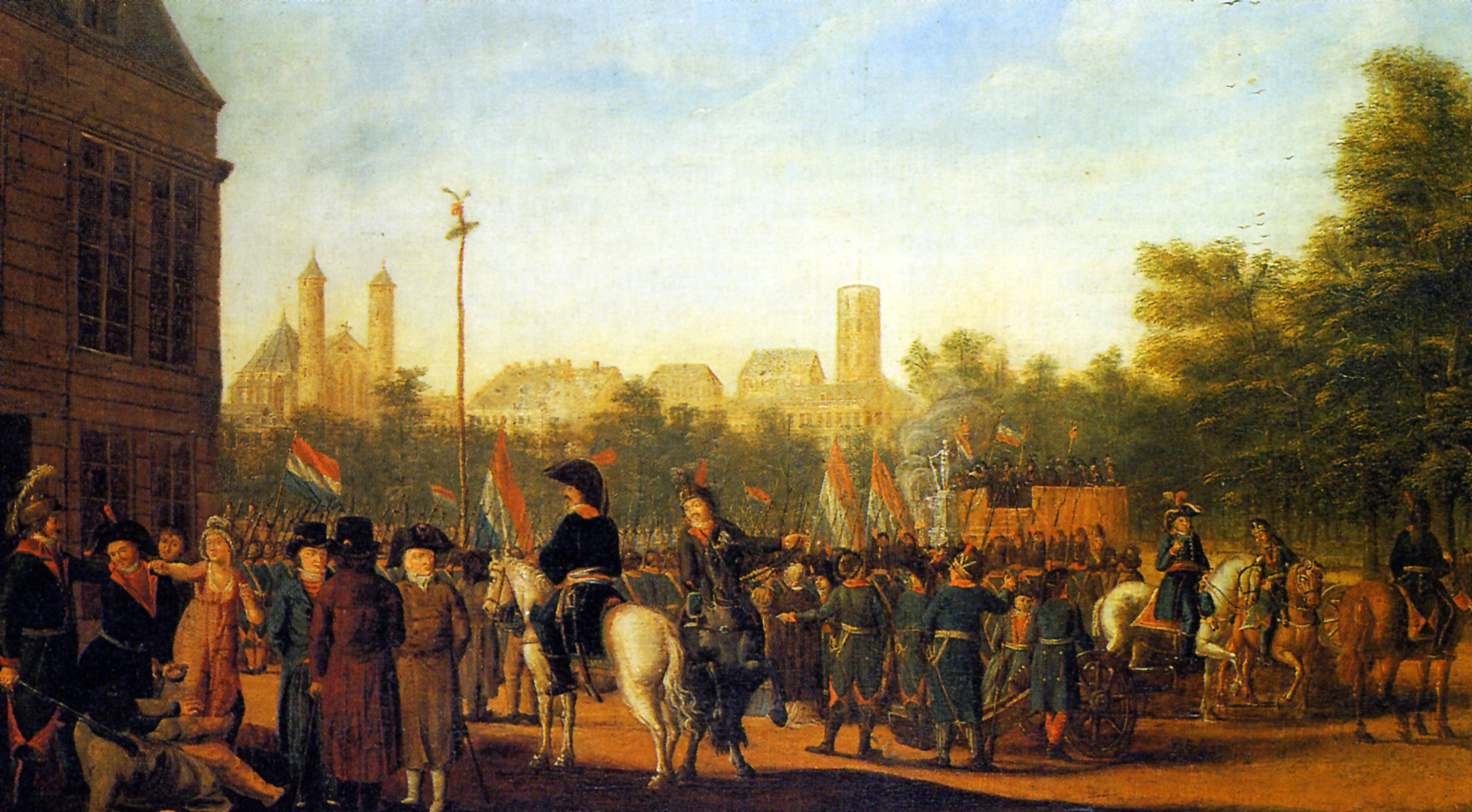
The French erected a tree of liberty on Neumarkt, Cologne, in 1794.

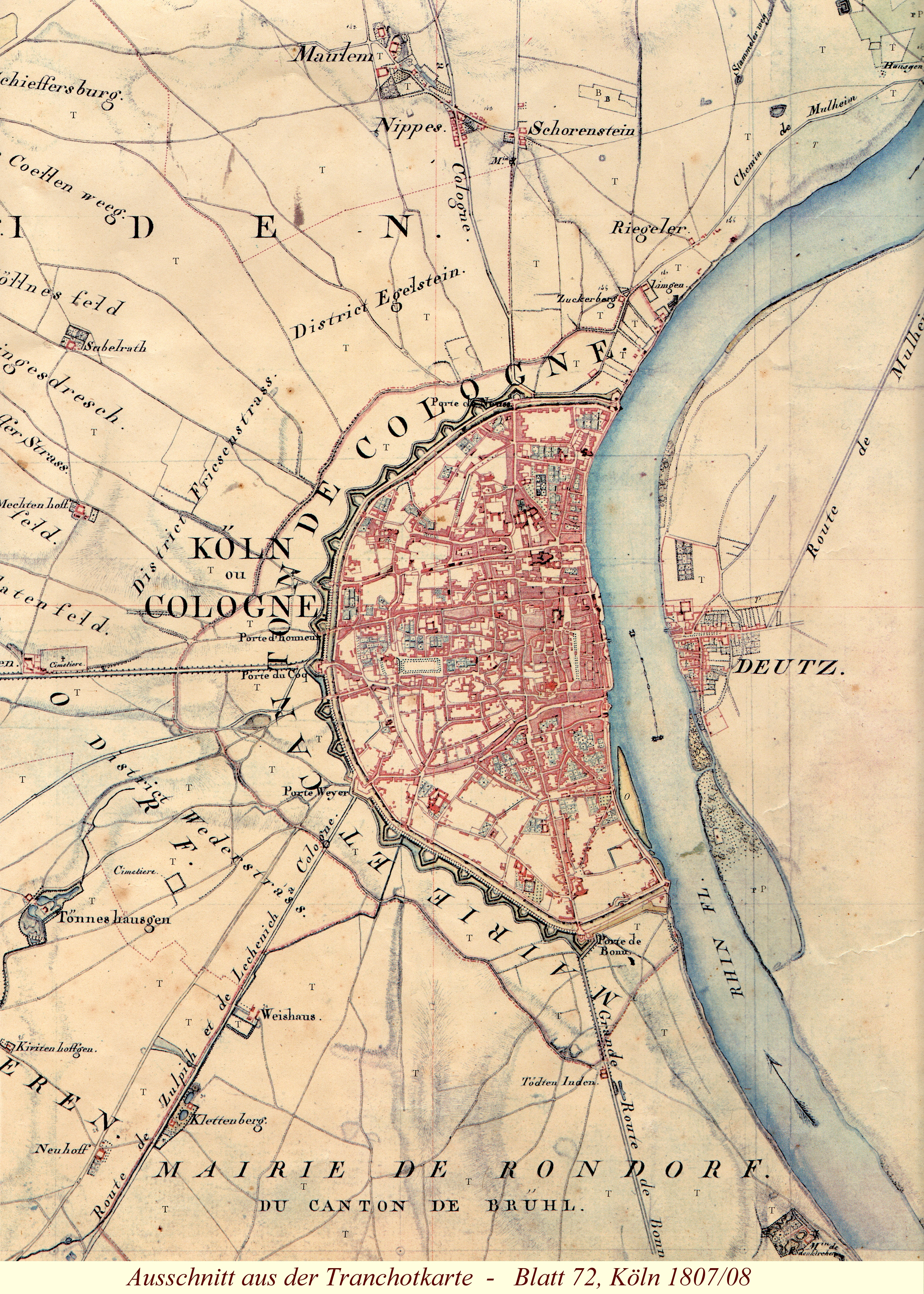
Canton de Cologne with some areas of the Canton Weiden in 1810

== History ==
=== Occupation, annexation, and incorporation ===
The occupation of areas left of the Rhine by French revolutionary troops occurred in late autumn of 1794. This annexation was preemptively recognised by the Peace of Campo Formio (1797) and later finalised in the Peace of Lunéville (1801).

The structural area regulations from within this intermittent period were based largely on the plans and proposals for a reorganization of the conquered territories, which were developed by the Government Commissioner and Judge of the Court of Cassation, François Joseph Rudler. The areas to be incorporated into the Republic of France were then organised into Départements, much like the French provinces had been post-1789, abolishing the present forms of feudal regional administration causing a gradual assimilation of the Rhenish to the French legal system.

The peace treaty of Lunéville in 1801 created a legal basis for the annexation of the new Rhenish départements formally carried out on September 23, 1802.

=== Governance and reforms ===
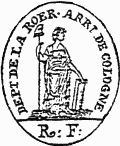
Seal of the Arrondissement de Cologne

Among the most significant aspects of the reorganisation was the introduction of the département's constitution in 1789. The conquered territory had been subdivided into four départements whose administration consisted of five members of a specially created directorate. One of these members was elected President on a yearly basis, without the possibility for more than one consecutive term. Below this level of government were the cantons, which, along with their municipalities, formed the next level of administration. The municipal administrations were led by municipal agents, recruited from constituent settlements. Both levels of government, departmental and cantonal administrations, were monitored by government commissioners.

The Napoleonic reform in February of this year, which came into force in May 1800, formed the management structure of a centralized and hierarchically-structured organisation.. Leading the départements, the territories of which remained unchanged, were prefects assisted by prefectural and general councils. The latter were responsible for the judiciary and taxation-related affairs.

The départements were now further subdivided into arrondissements, led by subprefects, who were in turn assisted by arrondissement councils.

Changes also occurred on a local level. Within the cantons, the large number of parishes, often composed of small settlements, experienced a decrease in number as ordered by the prefecture: They were united into Mairies . The respective Maire, to whom a municipal council was assigned, was subordinate to the subprefect inasmuch as the latter was subordinate to the prefect.

== Literature ==
- Joseph Hansen (Hg.): Quellen zur Geschichte des Rheinlandes im Zeitalter der Französischen Revolution 1780-1801
- Jakob Obermanns, Hanns Clemens: Die Gemeinde Lövenich im Spiegel der Geschichte . Verlag: Otto Ritterbach, Köln-Weiden 1956
- Wilhelm Janssen: Kleine Rheinische Geschichte . Düsseldorf 1997. Seite 261-264
- Carl Dietmar: Die Chronik Kölns. Chronik-Verlag, Dortmund 1991, ISBN 3-611-00193-7
