= Stuttgarter Zeitung =

German daily newspaper

- The 6 December 2005 front page
- Type: Daily newspaper (except Sundays)
- Format: Rhenish
- Owner: Stuttgarter Zeitung Verlagsgesellschaft mbH
- Editor: Joachim Dorfs
- Founded: 18 September 1945; 81 years ago
- Headquarters: Stuttgart, Germany
- Circulation: c. 200,000
- Website: www.stuttgarter-zeitung.de

The Stuttgarter Zeitung (lit. 'Stuttgart newspaper') is a German-language daily newspaper (except Sundays) edited in Stuttgart, Baden-Württemberg, Germany, with a run of about 200,000 sold copies daily.

== History and profile ==
It was first edited on 18 September 1945, just a few months after the end of the Second World War. With northern and central Württemberg being part of the American occupation zone from 1945 to 1949, it was the U.S. Information Control Division that issued the first publishing licence to the editors Josef Eberle (writer), Karl Ackermann and Henry Bernhard during the first years of the paper's existence. Erich Schairer joined them as co-editor in the fall of 1946. After Schairer's death, Eberle remained the editor until 1972. Today, its publishing house is Südwestdeutsche Medien Holding.

It is mainly read in Baden-Württemberg and therefore has a strong local and regional focus, but also has significant supra-regional, national and international sections, covered by separate respective editorial departments.

The paper is the recipient of the European Newspaper Award in the category of regional newspaper by the European Newspapers Congress in 2009.
