= Rhenish (format) =

Newspaper format

Comparison of some newspaper sizes with metric paper sizes. Approximate nominal dimensions are in millimetres.

Rhenish or Rhenisch (/ˈrɛnɪʃ/ REN-ish; German: Rheinisch [ˈʁaɪnɪʃ]) is a newspaper format associated with the Rhineland. It is one of three primary newspaper standards used in Germany. Rhenisch format pages measure around 350–360 mm by 510–530 mm (in either a horizontal or vertical orientation). A version of Rhenish around half the size is known as "half Rhenish" or "semi-Rhenish".
