= Heinz Oberhummer =

Austrian physicist and skeptic (1941–2015)

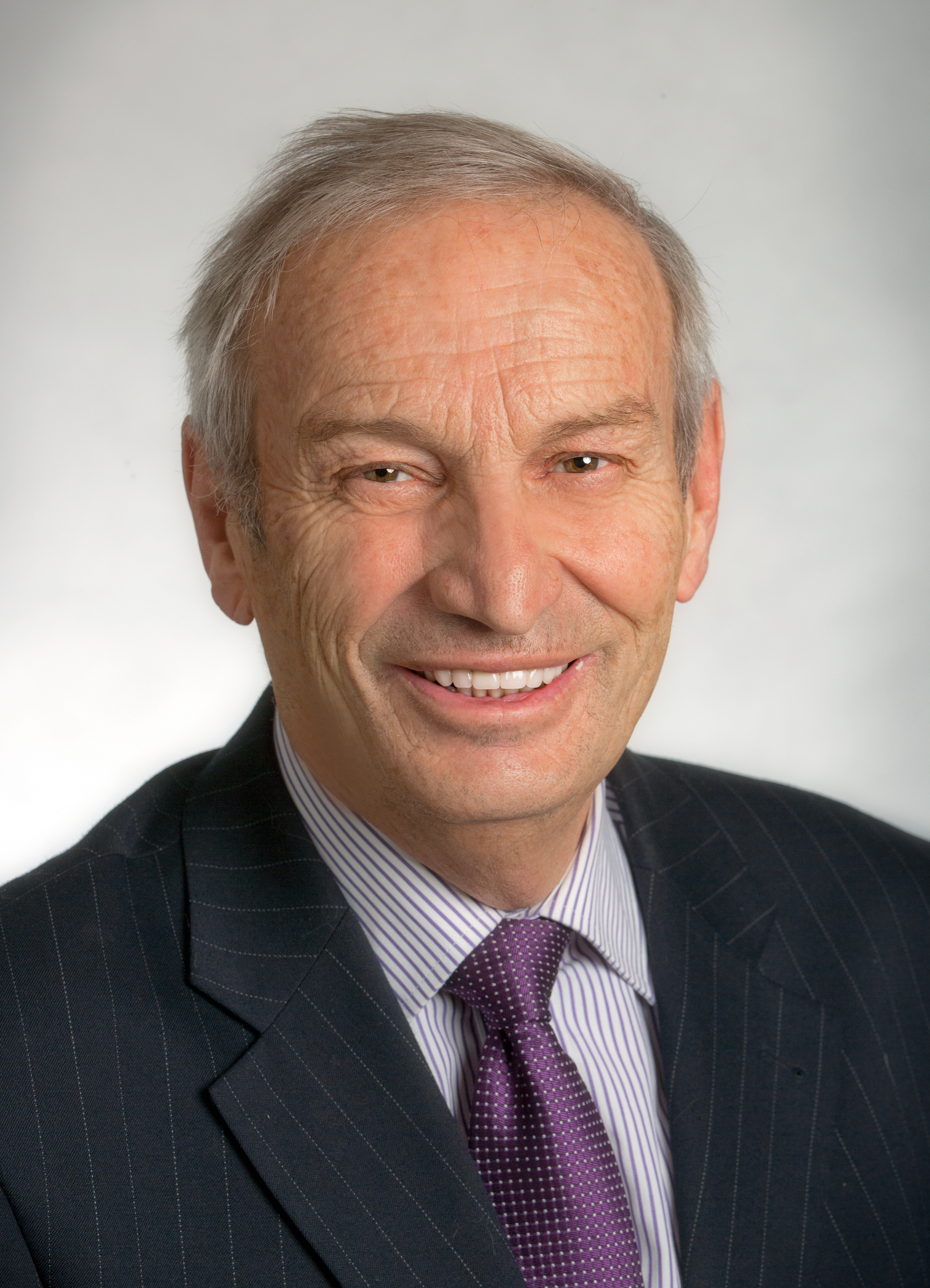
- Born: Heinz Oberhummer; 19 May 1941; Bischofshofen, Austria
- Died: 24 November 2015 (aged 74)
- Education: University of Graz; LMU Munich
- Children: 2
- Scientific career
- Fields: Theoretical Physics
- Workplaces: Vienna University of Technology

Heinz Oberhummer (19 May 1941 – 24 November 2015), was an Austrian physicist and skeptic.

== Biography ==
Heinz Oberhummer was born in Bischofshofen and grew up in Obertauern, Austria. He studied physics at the University of Graz and LMU Munich. He lived in the village of Oberwölbling in the Dunkelsteinerwald, Lower Austria. Heinz Oberhummer was married and had two children.

== Research fields ==
Heinz Oberhummer was professor emeritus of Theoretical Physics at the Atominstitut of the Technical University of Vienna. His main research area was nucleosynthesis. He was also involved in questions concerning the fine-tuning of the Universe. Oberhummer, Csótó und Schlattl could derive quantifiable results concerning the fine-tuning of the Universe by investigating the creation of carbon and oxygen in the triple-alpha process in red giants.

He was the initiator of Nuclei in the Cosmos, the most important international conference series in the field of nuclear astrophysics taking place for the tenth time in the year 2008 at Michigan State University in the United States.

He was especially engaged in the popularisation of scientific contents, including the new media. He developed Web-based learning and information systems and co-ordinated educational projects funded by the European Commission, such as Cinema and Science. He was also engaged in the creation and presentation of popular science with the Science Busters in the Rabenhof Theater in Vienna along with Werner Gruber and Martin Puntigam and as a weekly radio column and podcast in the Austrian youth radio station FM4.

He was a member of the Scientific Advisory Board of the Giordano Bruno Foundation and the Gesellschaft zur wissenschaftlichen Untersuchung von Parawissenschaften (GWUP), the German-speaking branch of the worldwide skeptical movement. Furthermore, he was president of the "Gesellschaft für Kritisches Denken" (the Austrian branch of the GWUP), and of the Austrian "Zentralrat für Konfessionsfreie" (National Council of Non-confessionals). Heinz Oberhummer was president of the secularist initiative "Religion ist Privatsache" (Religion is a private matter). He died in Vienna on 23 November 2015.

== Oberhummer Award ==
Heinz Oberhummer Award for Science Communication
- German: Heinz Oberhummer Award für Wissenschaftskommunikation
- Awarded for: Excellence in science communication
- Location: Vienna, Austria
- Reward: 20.000 euros
- First award: 24 November 2016; 9 years ago
- Website: oberhummeraward.at

Television/radio coverage
- Network: ORF 1
- Runtime: 1 hour, 37 minutes

After Oberhummer's death, the Heinz Oberhummer Award for Science Communication was established in his honor. The award is presented by the Science Busters, the Federal Ministry of Social Affairs, Health, Care and Consumer Protection (the Federal Ministry of Education, Science and Research until 2019), the Technical University of Vienna, the University of Graz, the City of Vienna, FM4 and the Austrian Broadcasting Corporation.

Oberhummer Award winners receive a glass of alpaca droppings and 20,000 euros. The annual ceremony takes place in the Stadtsaal in Vienna and is broadcast on national television.

=== Recipients ===
Year	Recipient	Description
2016	James Randi	Canadian-American debunker of paranormal claims
2017	Giulia Enders	German physician and writer
2018	Adam Savage	American myth buster
2019	No Such Thing as a Fish; James Harkin, Andrew Hunter Murray, Anna Ptaszynski and Dan Schreiber	English scientific podcast
2020	Mai Thi Nguyen-Kim	German chemist and YouTuber
2021	Coronavirus-Update; Korinna Hennig, Katharina Mahrenholtz, Beke Schulmann, Christian Drosten and Sandra Ciesek	German podcast on the COVID-19 pandemic
2022	Ig Nobel Prize	Satirical prize to promote public engagement with scientific research
2023	Die Sendung mit der Maus	German children's television series
2024	Methodisch inkorrekt! [de] Nicolas Wöhrl and Reinhard Remfort [de]	German scientific podcast
2025	Eckart von Hirschhausen	German physician, talk show host, comedian, author, and journalist
2026	Sandi Toksvig	Danish-British broadcaster, comedian, presenter and writer

== Selected publications ==
- Kann das alles Zufall sein – Geheimnisvolles Universum?, Ecowin-Verlag, Salzburg, 2008, ISBN 978-3902404541
- H. Oberhummer: Urknall und Sternenstaub – Der Kosmos aus naturwissenschaftlicher Sicht In Die Idee vom Anfang, Ritter Verlag, Klagenfurt, Wién, 2008, ISBN 978-3898464949
- H. Oberhummer: Maßarbeit oder Zufall – sind wir nicht anderes als Sternenstaub? In Der etwas andere Blick auf die Schöpfung, Haag + Herrchen: Frankfurt, 2007, ISBN 978-3898464949
- H. Oberhummer (Editor): Nuclei in the Cosmos, Graduate Texts in Contemporary Physics, Springer Verlag, Heidelberg, 1991, ISBN 0387541985
- H. Oberhummer, A. Patkos, T. Rauscher: Origin of the Chemical Elements. In: Handbook of Nuclear Chemistry, Vol. 2, Kap. 1, Kluwer, 2003, ISBN 1402013051
- H. Oberhummer, A. Csótó, H. Schlattl: Stellar production rates of carbon and its abundance in the Universe, Science 289, 2000, 88
- H. Oberhummer: Kerne und Sterne: Einführung in die Nukleare Astrophysik. In German. Barth, Leipzig, Berlin, Heidelberg 1993, ISBN 3335003195
