= Lydia Möcklinghoff =

German zoologist (1981–2026)

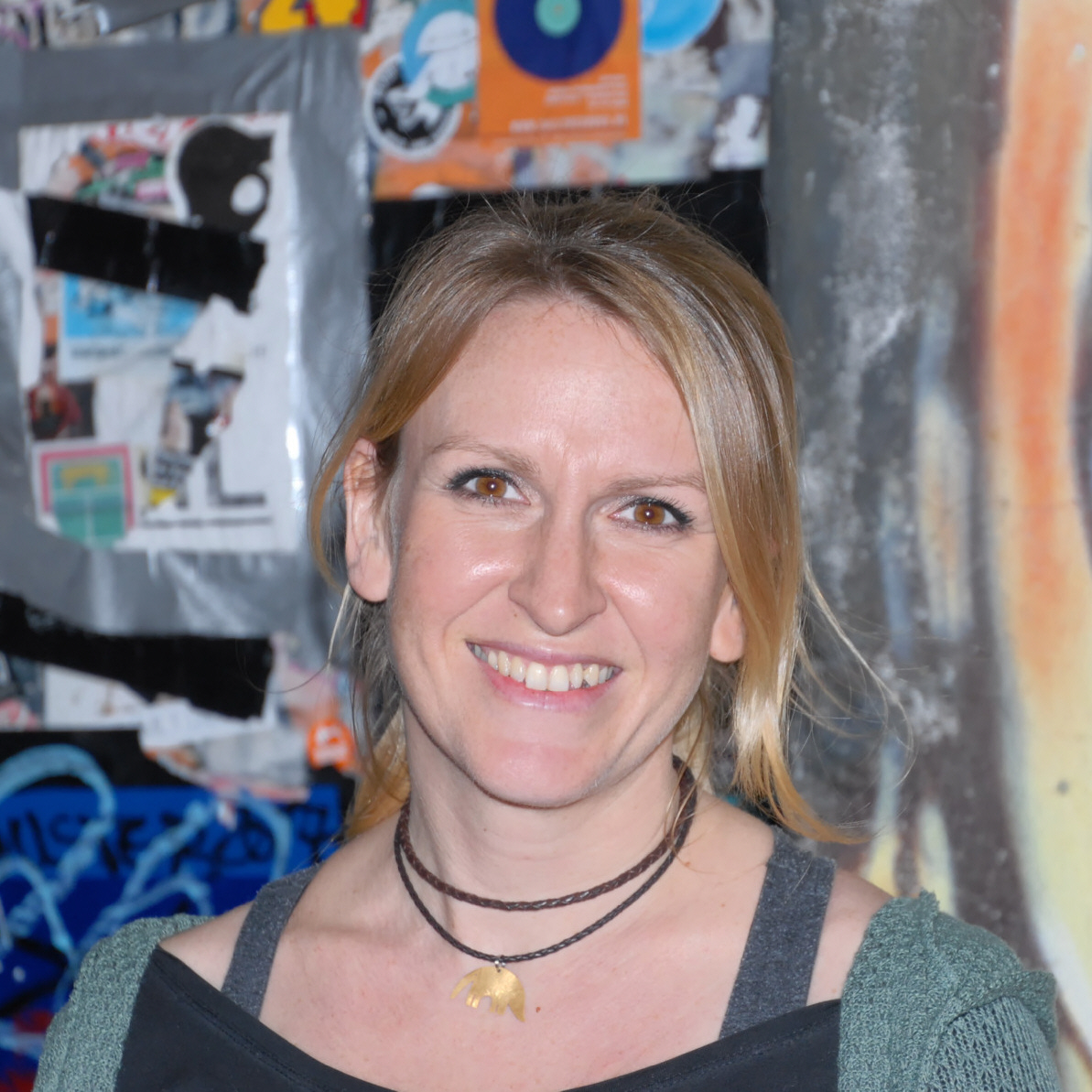
- Möcklinghoff in 2018
- Born: Lydia Theresia Möcklinghoff; 3 February 1981; Wilhelmshaven, Lower Saxony, West Germany
- Died: 3 July 2026 (aged 45) near Campo Grande, Mato Grosso do Sul, Brazil
- Education: University of Giessen; University of Würzburg
- Occupations: Zoologist; tropical ecologist; author; anteater researcher
- Known for: Studying the giant anteater

Lydia Theresia Möcklinghoff (3 February 1981 – 3 July 2026) was a German zoologist, tropical ecologist, author and anteater researcher. She was the first scientist to observe the life of the giant anteater, which is listed as endangered by the IUCN. She observed the life for over a year and researched its social behavior, habitat requirements, threats, and conditions essential for survival.

== Background ==
Lydia Möcklinghoff grew up with her sister in Cologne and Walldorf near Heidelberg. From 2003, she studied biology at the University of Giessen and, after completing her undergraduate studies, transferred to the Julius-Maximilians-University of Würzburg in 2005 to study tropical ecology and behavioral biology. She completed her diploma in biology there in 2008, specializing in animal ecology and tropical biology. Among others, she studied with Karl Eduard Linsenmair, Frauke Fischer and Jürgen Tautz, and from 2005 to 2008, she undertook several research stays with direct observations of the ecology and behavior of giant anteaters in Boa Vista in the northern Brazilian state of Roraima. Her dissertation was on her studies of the acceptance of giant anteaters (Myrmecophaga tridactyla) of the artificial plantation habitat in northern Brazil.

Funded by a doctoral scholarship from the German National Academic Foundation until June 2013, she conducted research from 2008/2009 as a doctoral student at the Zoological Research Museum Koenig (ZFMK) in the Tropical Ecology working group on the topic of conservation-relevant research on mammals in the Pantanal wetland in Brazil – implications for a wildlife-compatible land use practice. She collaborated with the State University of Mato Grosso in Brazil. In 2009, under project leader Karl-Ludwig Schuchmann, she participated in an excursion to the Brazilian Pantanal, which explored the terrestrial mammal fauna using camera traps and direct observations.

Möcklinghoff was responsible for the first multi-year research project on the ecology and behavior of the giant anteater of the Association of Zoological Gardens (VdZ). The German-Brazilian cooperation with veterinarians and biologists is supported by Dortmund Zoo and Cologne Zoo. She lived in Cologne and from 2009 onwards spent several months a year conducting field studies (Feldstudie), mammal camera trap studies and behavioural research on the giant anteater in the state of Mato Grosso do Sul on a fazenda in the southern Pantanal. The 110 km² “Fazenda Barranco Alto" is run by the biologist Lucas Leuzinger and his wife Marina Schweizer, an agricultural engineer, who provide accommodation for up to eight scientists from various research fields.

She worked as a science journalist for radio and nature film production companies, including the Geo magazine podcast (GEO. The Podcast.), Audible, and, from 2019, as a freelance writer for WDR. She collaborated with the production companies Doclights and Coraxfilm on two nature documentaries about the Pantanal. In her books, readings, lectures, science slams, and radio and television appearances, she informed the public about species conservation, her research, and the life of the giant anteater. From 2023, she co-hosted the podcast tierisch!, with Frauke Fischer, for which she won the Fast Forward Science competition in the Best Audio Debut category in 2024.

Möcklinghoff died on the morning of 3 July 2026, along with her pilot, when their twin-engine aircraft, a Neiva-built EMB-810D, crashed in dense fog near Campo Grande, the capital of Mato Grosso do Sul. She was 45. The crash site is near Santa Maria Airport (SSKG), located a few kilometers southeast of the city.

== Research ==
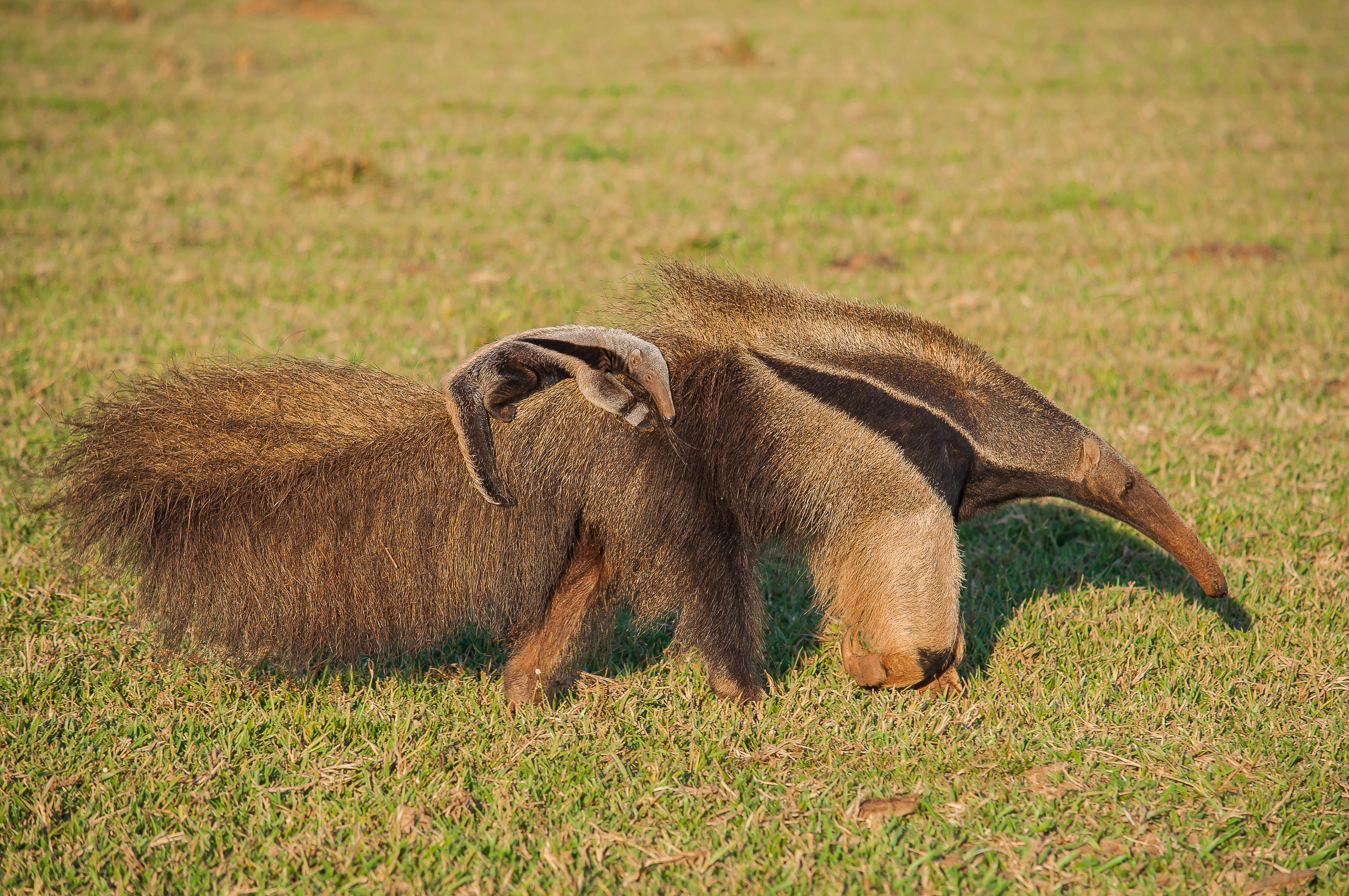
Giant anteater with young in the Pantanal

Much is still unknown about the behavior of giant anteaters in the wild, as no long-term observations exist and the few larger studies on their behavior are partly outdated. Möcklinghoff attempted to answer open questions, such as those concerning mate choice and mating behaviour, which has only been observed in zoos but never in the wild, as well as the animal's marking behaviour.

Möcklinghoff studied the behaviour of the animals in an artificial plantation habitat in northern Brazil. Large parts of the native savanna there had been reforested with timber plantations. In her dissertation, she demonstrated that the sustainably managed timber plantations of the acacia species Acacia mangium were not only accepted by giant anteaters as an alternative habitat, but were preferred to the natural environment of the northern Brazilian savanna. Contrary to data from the literature, the animals, which occurred there in exceptionally high densities, had very small, overlapping home ranges in which they avoided encounters through temporally organized spatial use, possibly coordinated by scent marking on trees. Together with a colleague, she observed for the first time that anteaters scratched the bark of trees, climbed them, and rubbed themselves against the trunk at a height of about one meter, presumably to leave scent marks that could serve as social communication among the animals. This marking behavior was previously unknown in anteaters.

Their research in the Pantanal aimed to protect giant anteaters, which are already extinct in some areas. The goal was to develop conservation strategies for the species and its habitat. To this end, data on activity and movement patterns were collected through a camera trap study, and a photographic register of the animals was created. This revealed that anteaters in the wild reproduce annually. Observations from northern Brazil regarding stable, overlapping home ranges were also confirmed in the Pantanal, as was the exchange of information through scent marking. The development of radio collars adapted to the anteaters' body structure allows their movement patterns to be tracked over a year.

== Publications ==
In her 2015 book, "Ich glaub, mein Puma pfeift!", she describes her research activities in Brazil. In 2016, she published "The Super Noses: How Conservationists Are Saving Anteaters & Co. from Extinction", an overview of the current fields of work for zoologists and ecologists and “an authentic picture of current field research […] peppered with information on the culture of the respective country and short excursions into ecology and evolution”. This book incorporates experiences from her research stays, such as the initiation in 2014 of a camera trap study in the mountain rainforest among the Naso people on the Rio Teribe in Panama.

== Literature ==
- Social Organization and Habitat Use of the Giant Anteater (Myrmecophaga tridactyla) in Timber Plantations in Northern Brazil. Diplomarbeit, 2008.
- The Giant Anteater (Myrmecophaga tridactyla) – Influence of natural and anthropogenic changes in habitat on the ecology of giant anteaters in the southern Pantanal, Mato Grosso do Sul, Brazil. Dissertation, 2011.
- with Karl-Ludwig Schuchmann, Kathrin Burs, Ricarda Wistuba, Marinêz I. Marques, Olaf Jahn, Todor Ganchev, Josiel M. de Figueiredo, Filipe Ferreira de Deus: Descobrindo a vida secreta dos mamíferos do Pantanal. In: Sociedade Brasileira de Zoologia, Nr. 108, April 2014, S. 7–8 (online PDF)
- Ich glaub mein Puma pfeift! Als Forscherin im reichsten Tierparadies der Welt. Bastei Lübbe, 2015, ISBN 978-3-404-60861-4 (online, eingeschränkte Vorschau)
- Die Supernasen. Wie Artenschützer Ameisenbär & Co. vor dem Aussterben bewahren. Mit Illustrationen von Lydia Möcklinghoff. Carl Hanser Verlag, 2016, ISBN 978-3-446-44874-2.
- Erbsenhirnparalleluniversumsforschung am Beispiel des Großen Ameisenbären. In: Ein Science-Slam-Buch. Hrsg. André Lampe, Lektora Verlag, 2017, ISBN 978-3-95461-095-2.
- Just another day in Paradise: Was Ameisenbären mit dem Überleben von Homo sapiens zu tun haben. In: Weltrettung braucht Wissenschaft. Hrsg. Franca Parianen, Rowohlt, Hamburg 2023, ISBN 978-3-644-01440-4

== Public appearances and broadcast series (selection) ==
Television and radio

- Leute. SWR1, 26 November 2012
- Doppelkopf. hr2-kultur, 23 August 2016
- Markus Lanz. ZDF, 19 October 2016
- Lesart. Deutschlandfunk Kultur, 22 November 2016
- 3 nach 9. Radio Bremen TV, 2 December 2016
- Planet Wissen. WDR/SWR, 1 February 2017<ref
- Sonntagsfragen. WDR 2, 5 February 2017
- Resonanzen. WDR 3 Live Radio, 10 April 2017
- Westart. WDR, 10 April 2017
- SWR2 Wissen: Aula. SWR2, 20 June 2017
- Im Gespräch. Deutschlandfunk Kultur, 31 July 2017
- Jörg Thadeusz. WDR 2, 24 May 2018
- Das Ameisenbärtagebuch. Flux FM, 14 Folgen, 4 June – 10 September 2018. Konzept, Autorin, Moderation und Aufnahmen: Lydia Möcklinghoff. Produktion und Schnitt: Flux FM
- Nachtcafé. SWR Fernsehen, 11 January 2019
- Weltweit. SWR3, 13 January 2019
- Heimatflimmern: Dschungel in der Stadt – Der Kölner Zoo. Film von Herbert Ostwald, WDR Fernsehen, 5 April 2019 (Min. 36:30–39:45)
- Markus Lanz. ZDF, 26 September 2019 (ab Min. 2:57)
- Gürteltier Aktuell. SWR3 Weltweit, 2019, 12 Teile. Konzept, Autorin, Moderation: Lydia Möcklinghoff. Aufnahmen und Schnitt: Sabrina Kemmer
- Ameisenbär Aktuell. SWR3 Weltweit, 2019, 12 Teile. Konzept, Autorin, Moderation: Lydia Möcklinghoff. Aufnahmen und Schnitt: Sabrina Kemmer
- Sumpf ist Trumpf., 2019, 11 Teile. Konzept, Autorin, Moderation und Aufnahmen: Lydia Möcklinghoff, Produktion und Schnitt: Flux FM
- Expeditionen ins Tierreich: Unter Raubkatzen und Ameisenbären. Norddeutscher Rundfunk, 3 November 2021
- Zwischentöne. Deutschlandfunk, 13 April 2025
- Anna und die wilden Tiere: Das Geheimnis der Blattschneiderameisen, Willkommen in der Gürteltierwelt Wie schwer ist der Ameisenbär?
- Mehrteilige Staffeln: "Lydia im Pantanal" und "Lydias Pantanal-Abenteuer" in MausLive. WDR 5

Science slams, readings, lectures

- Science Slam Karlsruhe, 24 April 2013
- Science Slam Dortmund, 27 May 2013
- Science Slam, October 2015
- Science Slam Halle, 18 November 2016
- Frankfurter Science-Slam des Physikalischen Vereins, 19 November 2016
- Vortrag Kölner Zoo, 13 December 2016
- Lesung Tiergarten Straubing, 2017
- Vortrag im Luchskino am Bergzoo Halle, 25 April 2017
- Science Slam, Universität Gießen, 3 November 2017
- Lesung RWTH Aachen in der Reihe LiteraTour Aachen, 10 April 2018
- Science Slam Köln, 11 April 2018
