= Marga Gual Soler =

Spanish science diplomat

External media

Audio
- Marga Gual Soler: on science diplomacy as a contact sport, Science Soapbox

Video
- AAAS Science Diplomacy Online Course

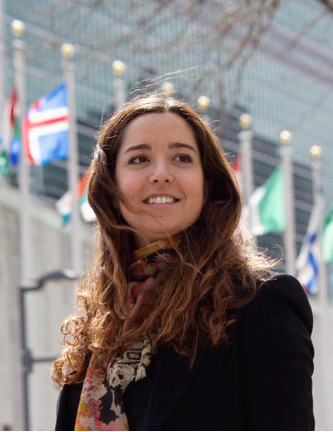
Marga Gual Soler at the UN Headquarters in New York City.

María Margarita Gual Soler is a Spanish science diplomat, policy advisor, international speaker and educator. She is best known for helping elevate the role of science in international diplomacy and strengthening the connections between science, policy and society. She played a major role in promoting science diplomacy around the world by developing its educational and training approaches with the Center for Science Diplomacy of the American Association for the Advancement of Science (AAAS). She advised the science diplomacy strategies of several governments and the European Union and helped re-establish the scientific linkages between the United States and Cuba. Gual Soler has received many fellowships and awards, including the Global Competitiveness Leadership Fellowship at Georgetown University, was named one of 40 Under 40 Latinos in Foreign Policy by The Huffington Post and is a former Aspen Ideas Festival Scholar. In 2019 she was selected to join Homeward Bound, the largest-ever expedition of women in Antarctica.

== Early life and education ==
Gual Soler was born and grew up in the Mediterranean island of Mallorca. She received her BS in biology from University of Barcelona in Spain, and her PhD in Molecular Biosciences from the University of Queensland in Australia. She trained with the United Nations Department of Economic and Social Affairs in New York, helping to elevate the voices of the scientific community in the transition from the Millennium Development Goals to the Sustainable Development Goals (SDGs).

== Science diplomacy career ==
As an expert in science diplomacy, Gual Soler helps organizations around the world strengthen the linkages between science, technology and international affairs, with a focus in developing leadership skills for the next generation of globally engaged scientists and engineers. As Assistant Research Professor at Arizona State University, she designed new science diplomacy education and training curriculum, which she later expanded as senior project director at the AAAS Center for Science Diplomacy. In this role, she led training programs in science policy, science diplomacy and science advice in over 20 countries, in partnership with universities, foreign ministries, academies of sciences and international organizations including The World Academy of Sciences, the Inter-American Institute for Global Change Research, UNESCO, the Global Young Academy, and the International Network for Government Science Advice, among many others. She launched the first online course on science diplomacy, analyzed and mapped mechanisms to engage scientists and engineers with policy around the world, and served as associate editor of the journal Science & Diplomacy.

Gual Soler oversaw the implementation of a landmark science cooperation agreement between AAAS and the Cuban Academy of Sciences following the re-opening of diplomatic relations between the United States and Cuba in 2015. In a 2015 article in Slate magazine she reflects: " I could have never imagined that someday I would be able to use my scientific skills to help improve relationships between two countries that have been enemies for nearly six decades.”

Gual Soler supported the science diplomacy strategies of the governments of Spain, Panama, Mexico, and the European Union. As member of the Research, Innovation and Science Experts (RISE) high-level advisory group to European Commissioner Carlos Moedas, she contributed to two books on the future of research and innovation in Europe and advised two Horizon 2020-funded projects: "Inventing a Shared Science Diplomacy for Europe (InsSciDE)" and "Science Diplomacy for Global Challenges (S4D4C)".

== Public engagement with science ==
Under the auspices of UNESCO, Gual Soler helped launch the Latin American chapter of the World Association of Young Scientists (WAYS) with Mandë Holford, and co-founded the Science Slam Festival, a new science communication initiative combining science and performing arts in Latin America, held in Spain, Mexico, Uruguay and Paraguay. She also led policy engagement for the European project “Participatory Engagement with Scientific and Technological Research through Performance (PERFORM).

She is an advocate for women and minorities in science, frequently writing and speaking on the challenges that women in STEM fields face globally. She spoke at the 2018 March for Science in Washington, D.C., on the benefits of global scientific collaboration. She is a member of Homeward Bound, an annual leadership program held in Antarctica to help raise the visibility, collaboration and policy impact of women on the future of the planet.

== Honors and awards ==
- Global Competitiveness Leadership Program at Georgetown University (2014)
- 10 Latinas Think Big Innovators to Watch (2016)
- 2016 Stylish Scientist by Future-Ish (2016)
- 40 Under 40 Latinos in Foreign Policy by The Huffington Post (2017)
- 100 Spanish Experts in Innovation (Los 100 de Cotec) by Fundación Cotec
- Aspen Ideas Festival Scholar (2017)
- Homeward Bound Women in Leadership Program (2018)
