= Christian Iliadis =

Physicist

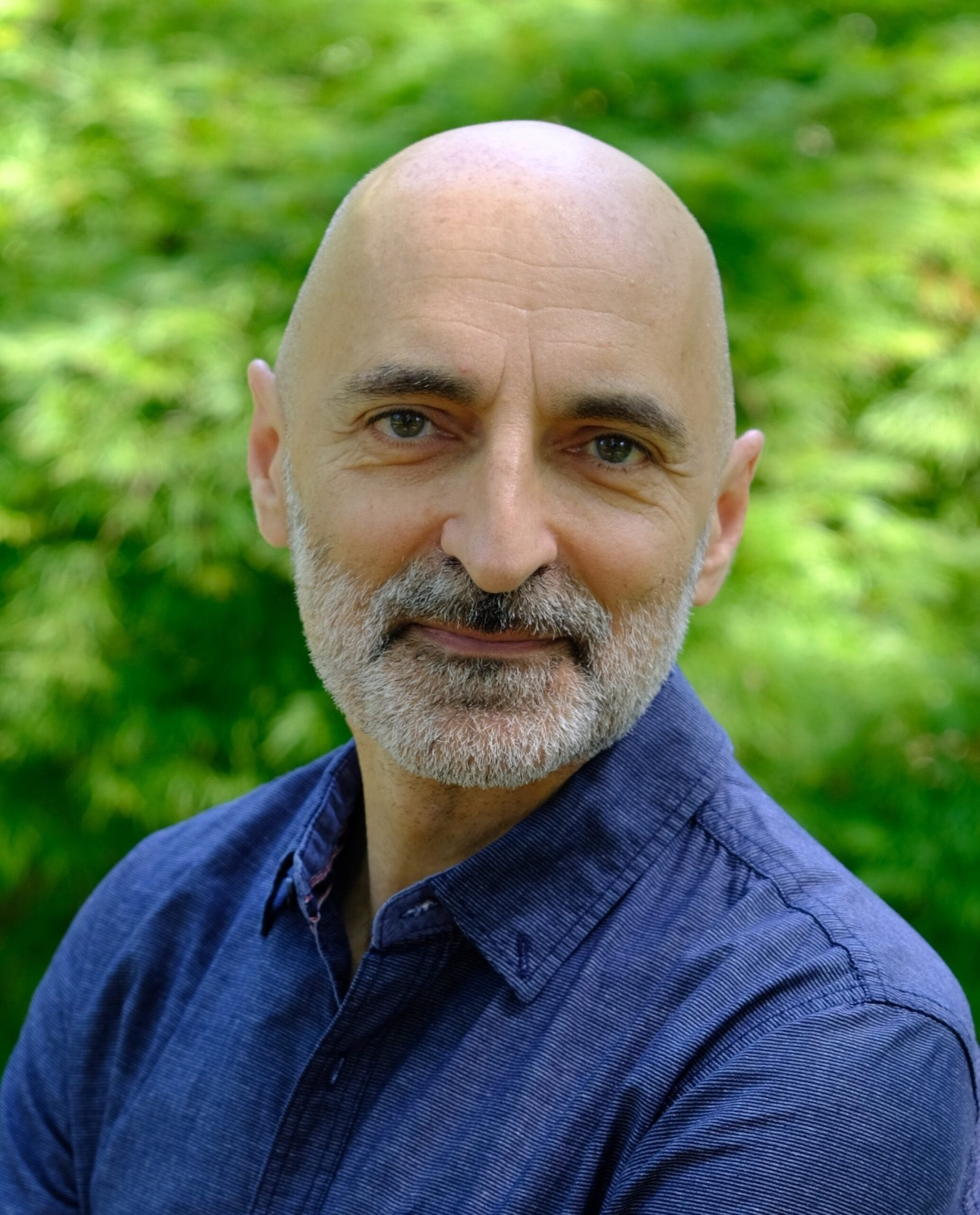
- Born: Germany
- Occupation: Physicist

Academic background
- Education: Diplom, Physics; PhD, Physics
- Alma mater: University of Münster; University of Notre Dame
- Thesis: Explosive stellar hydrogen burning in the mass A=30–40 region (1993)
- Website: iliadis.web.unc.edu

Christian Iliadis is a physicist, and J. Ross Macdonald Distinguished Professor at the University of North Carolina at Chapel Hill and faculty member at the Triangle Universities Nuclear Laboratory.

He received the University of North Carolina Board of Governors' Teaching Award in 2014 and the 2019 Jesse W. Beams Research Award from the Southeastern Section of the American Physical Society (APS). In 2023, he was elected a fellow of the APS.

== Early life and education ==
Iliadis was born in Bersenbrück, Germany, to Pontic Greek parents and holds American and Greek citizenship. Iliadis earned his Diplom in Physics from the University of Münster in 1989 under the supervision of Claus Rolfs. He then pursued doctoral studies, receiving his Ph.D. in Physics from the University of Notre Dame in 1993, advised by Michael Wiescher.

== Career ==
Following his Ph.D., Iliadis conducted postdoctoral research at TRIUMF from 1993 to 1996. He joined the University of North Carolina at Chapel Hill as an assistant professor in 1996 and became a professor in 2006. He chaired the Department of Physics and Astronomy at UNC from 2016 to 2021. In 2018, he was appointed J. Ross Macdonald Distinguished Professor at UNC. He also works as a faculty member at the Triangle Universities Nuclear Laboratory.

He received the 2019 Jesse W. Beams Research Award from the Southeastern Section of the American Physical Society (APS), jointly with Arthur E. Champagne, for their "research leadership in experimental nuclear astrophysics, especially for the conception and development of their measurement program of thermonuclear reaction rates at TUNL's Laboratory for Experimental Nuclear Astrophysics". In 2023, he was elected a fellow of the APS for "pioneering direct measurements of stellar nuclear reactions and fundamental contributions to our understanding of stellar evolution and explosions."

== Research ==
Iliadis's work has focused on nuclear astrophysics, to study the nuclear reactions that power stars. In 2007, he wrote the textbook Nuclear Physics of Stars, which discussed the fundamentals of nuclear astrophysics, including thermonuclear reactions and stellar nucleosynthesis. He published a second edition of the book in 2015, which has been translated into Chinese and Persian.

Iliadis's research has combined nuclear experimental, theoretical, and computational approaches to understand the nuclear processes in classical novae, globular clusters, AGB stars, presolar stardust grains, and the Big Bang. He has developed Monte Carlo codes and Bayesian techniques to estimate thermonuclear reaction rates.

== Awards and honors ==
- 2014 – Board of Governors' Teaching Award, University of North Carolina Board of Governors
- 2019 – Jesse W. Beams Research Award, American Physical Society Southern Section
- 2023 – Fellow, American Physical Society

== Bibliography ==
=== Books ===
- Iliadis, Christian (2015). Nuclear Physics of Stars (2nd ed.). Wiley-VCH. ISBN 978-3527336487.

=== Selected articles ===
- Iliadis, C.; Champagne, A.; José, J.; Starrfield, S.; Tupper, P. (2002). "The Effects of Thermonuclear Reaction-Rate Variations on Nova Nucleosynthesis: A Sensitivity Study". The Astrophysical Journal Supplement Series. 142 (1): 105. arXiv:astro-ph/0206020. Bibcode:2002ApJS..142..105I. doi:10.1086/341400.
- Iliadis, C.; Longland, R.; Champagne, A. E.; Coc, A.; Fitzgerald, R. (2010). "Charged-particle thermonuclear reaction rates: II. Tables and graphs of reaction rates and probability density functions". Nuclear Physics A. 841 (1–4): 31–250. arXiv:1004.4517. Bibcode:2010NuPhA.841...31I. doi:10.1016/j.nuclphysa.2010.04.009.
- Sallaska, A. L.; Iliadis, C.; Champagne, A. E.; Goriely, S.; Starrfield, S.; Timmes, F. X. (2013). "STARLIB: a next-generation reaction-rate library for nuclear astrophysics". The Astrophysical Journal Supplement Series. 207 (1): 18. arXiv:1304.7811. Bibcode:2013ApJS..207...18S. doi:10.1088/0067-0049/207/1/18.
- Downen, L.; Iliadis, C.; Champagne, A.; Clegg, T.; Coc, A.; José, J. (2022). "Hydrogen burning of 29Si and its impact on presolar stardust grains from classical novae". The Astrophysical Journal. 928 (2): 128. arXiv:2202.11568. doi:10.3847/1538-4357/ac582b.
