= Braco (faith healer) =

Croatian faith healer

Josip Grbavac (born on November 23, 1967), better known as Braco (Croatian pronunciation: [brǎːt͡so]), sometimes called "The Gazer", is a Croatian self-styled "healer". He does not touch, speak to, diagnose, or treat the people who come to see him — rather, he stands on a platform and gazes. He avoids direct claims to have the ability to help people with his eye contact, but it is strongly implied and supporters report it causing improved well-being.

== Early life ==
Braco was born Josip Grbavac in Zagreb, SR Croatia, Yugoslavia on 23 November 1967. He earned a degree in economics in Croatia, married and started a family. He began practicing "healing" after the 1991–1995 Croatian War of Independence. Braco's mentor was Ivica Prokić, a Serbian economist, whom he met in the autumn of 1993. Prokić suggested the name Braco, meaning "little brother." Prokić died in 1995 while on holiday. The two were alone on a beach in South Africa, when Braco says a "rogue wave" swept Prokić away after he had first taken off all of the gold jewelry he traditionally wore along with his socks and wallet. After Prokić's death, Braco initially saw people one on one, however, due to the large number of people who started coming to see him, he began gazing at groups.

== Gazing ==
At public events, Braco stands on a podium following a ten-minute period of introduction and silently looks at the members of the audience for a period of five to ten minutes. Afterwards, during a period called "meditation and reflection" by supporters, believers have claimed to experience life changes, healings and positive experiences. According to supporters, during the "gaze time" they feel tingling, see energy or a golden aura, or experience peace or relief from pain. Braco reportedly does not call himself a healer or claim to have spiritual powers. Braco reportedly "has not spoken to the press or in public since 2002", Participants and event organizers claim that his gaze has cured physical diseases such as cancer and respiratory disease. Believers claim Braco's physical presence is not necessary, and gazing at a picture or video of him can be sufficient for healing. When not touring, Braco holds gazing sessions at his center in Zagreb, Croatia. Braco's Croatian events draw thousands of people, totaling to over two hundred thousand annually.

== Criticism ==
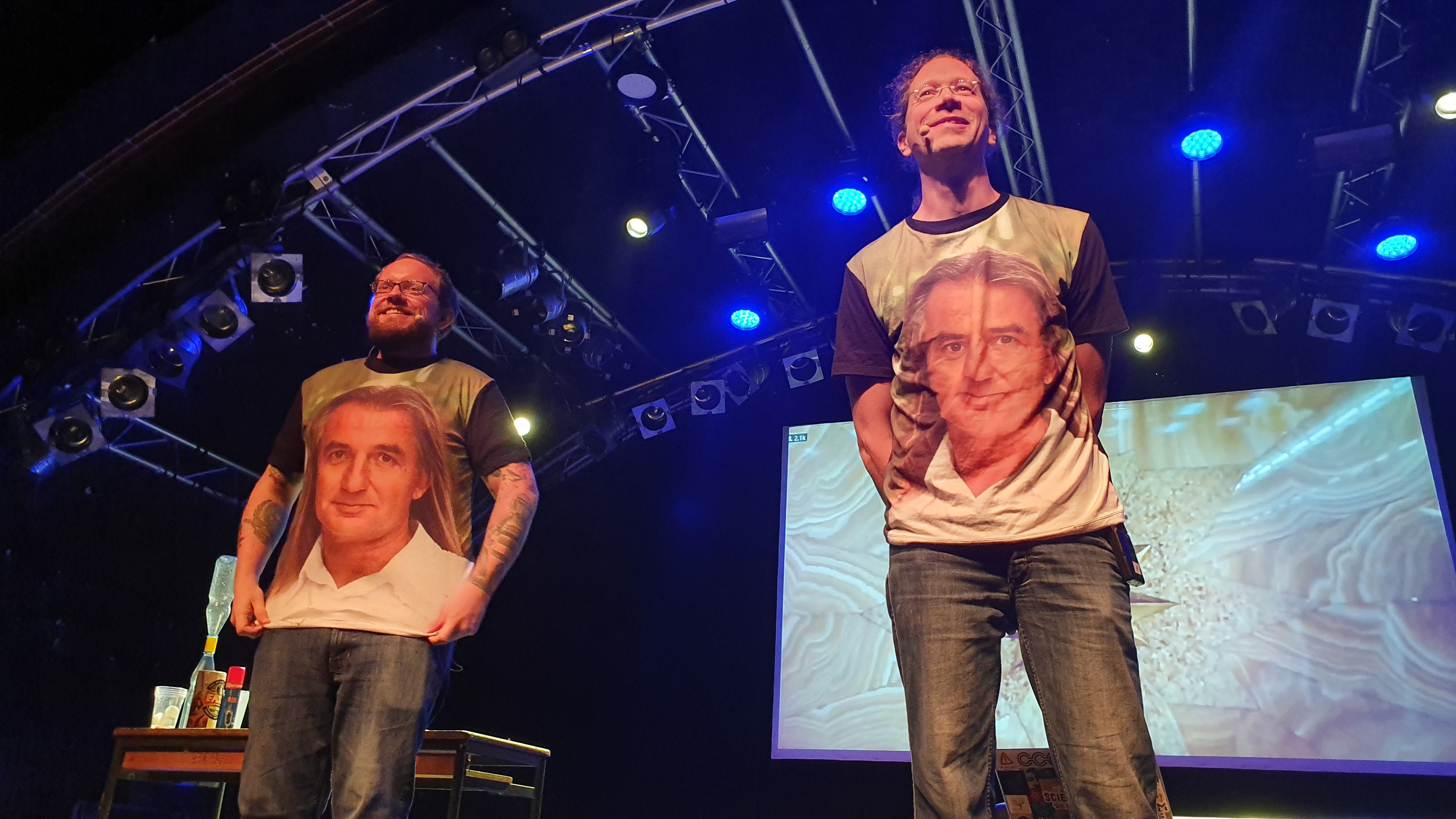
German science popularizers Reinhard Remfort (left) and Nicolas Wöhrl, discussing and wearing T-shirts with the likeness of Braco, 2019

In her column for the Committee for Skeptical Inquiry, Karen Stollznow wrote that since all reports of healing are anecdotal and that Braco's alleged healing abilities have never been proven under test conditions, she writes there is no scientific evidence that Braco's gazing has any benefits at all. The article also disagreed with Braco's statement that he makes no claims of healing abilities, saying: "However, the 'no claim' claim is disingenuous; whether the claims come from the public or his crew, the claims are promoted by and therefore made by Braco."
