= Giulia Enders =

German author and scientist (born 1990)

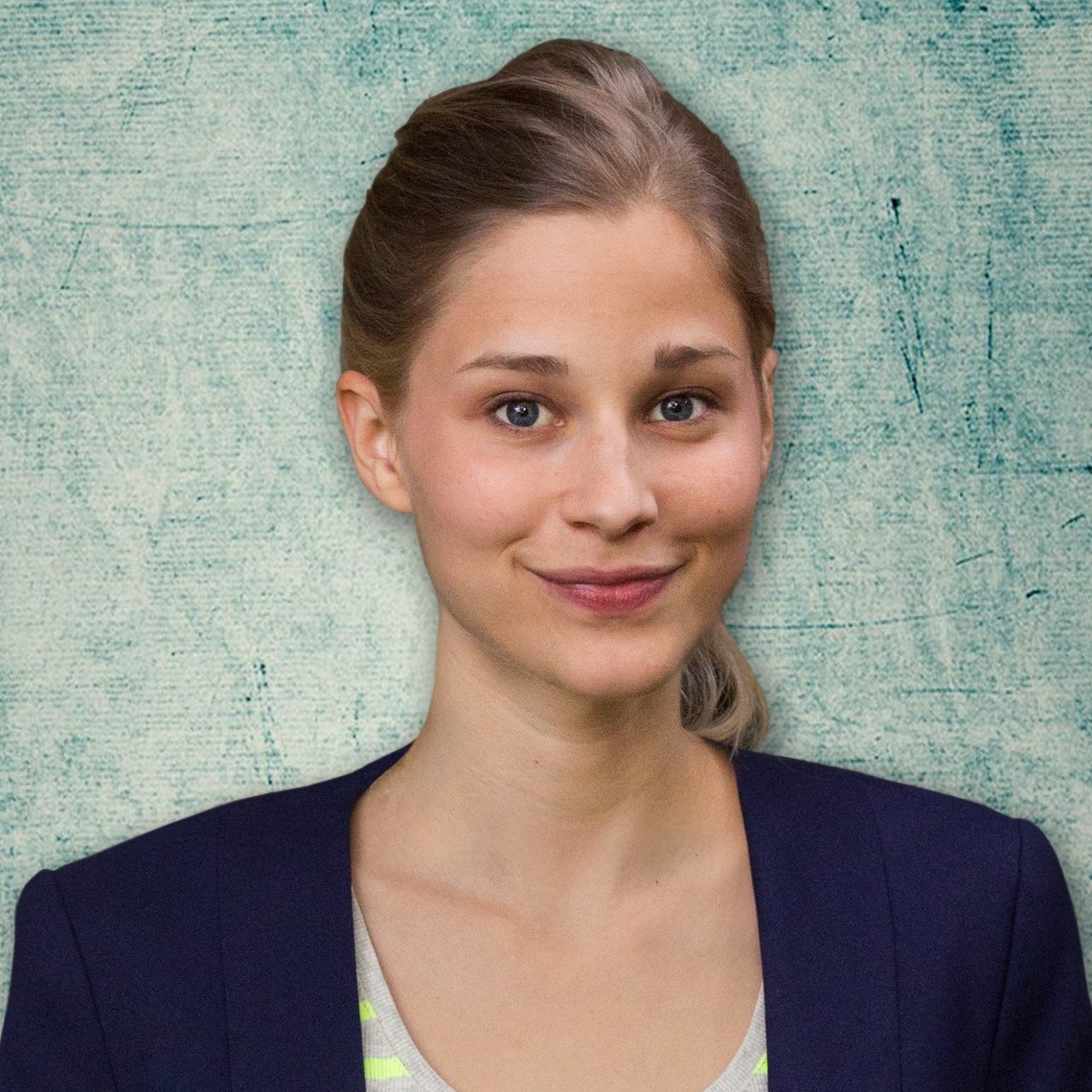
- Born: 1990; Mannheim, Baden-Württemberg, West Germany
- Education: Goethe University Frankfurt
- Website: www.darm-mit-charme.de

Giulia Enders (born 1990 in Mannheim) is a German writer and scientist whose first book Gut: The Inside Story of Our Body's Most Underrated Organ, has sold more than two million copies in Germany and was published in English, French (more than one million copies sold), Italian, Spanish, Arabic and other translations in 2015.

== Biography ==
Enders is enrolled in the doctoral (M.D.) programme in gastroenterology at Goethe University Frankfurt. In 2012, she won the first prize at the Science Slam in Freiburg, Berlin and Karlsruhe with her talk Darm mit Charme (Charming Bowels). This talk was also published on YouTube. Enders received the offer to write a book about this subject that has sat atop the German paperback charts shortly after the release in March 2014. The drawings for the book were made by her older sister Jill Enders. She appeared in the German talk-shows 3 nach 9 and Markus Lanz.

The book "Gut" (original "Darm mit Charme") was published in March 2014; in July 2014, the editor Ullstein Verlag announced that 500,000 copies were sold. The rights for the book have been sold in 18 countries.

In her book, she explains the functions and the importance of the human gastrointestinal tract. She also criticises the excess of hygiene in society and its impact on the immune system (hygiene hypothesis).

She is currently working on her thesis about the topic Acinetobacter baumannii that can cause infected wounds, respiratory diseases and blood poisoning. She would like to become a gastroenterologist afterwards.

She has been a main cast of the Netflix documentary "Hack your Health: The Secrets of Your Gut."

== Awards ==
- Heinz Oberhummer Award for Science Communication (2017)

== Books ==
- Enders, Giulia (10 March 2014). Darm mit Charme (in German). Berlin: Ullstein. ISBN 978-3-550-08041-8.
  - English translation: Enders, Giulia (2015). Gut. Greystone Books Ltd. ISBN 978-1-77164-149-4.
  - Audiobook: Shortened version read by Giulia Enders, 229 minutes, 3 CDs, Audio Media, München 2014.
