= Thilo Hagendorff =

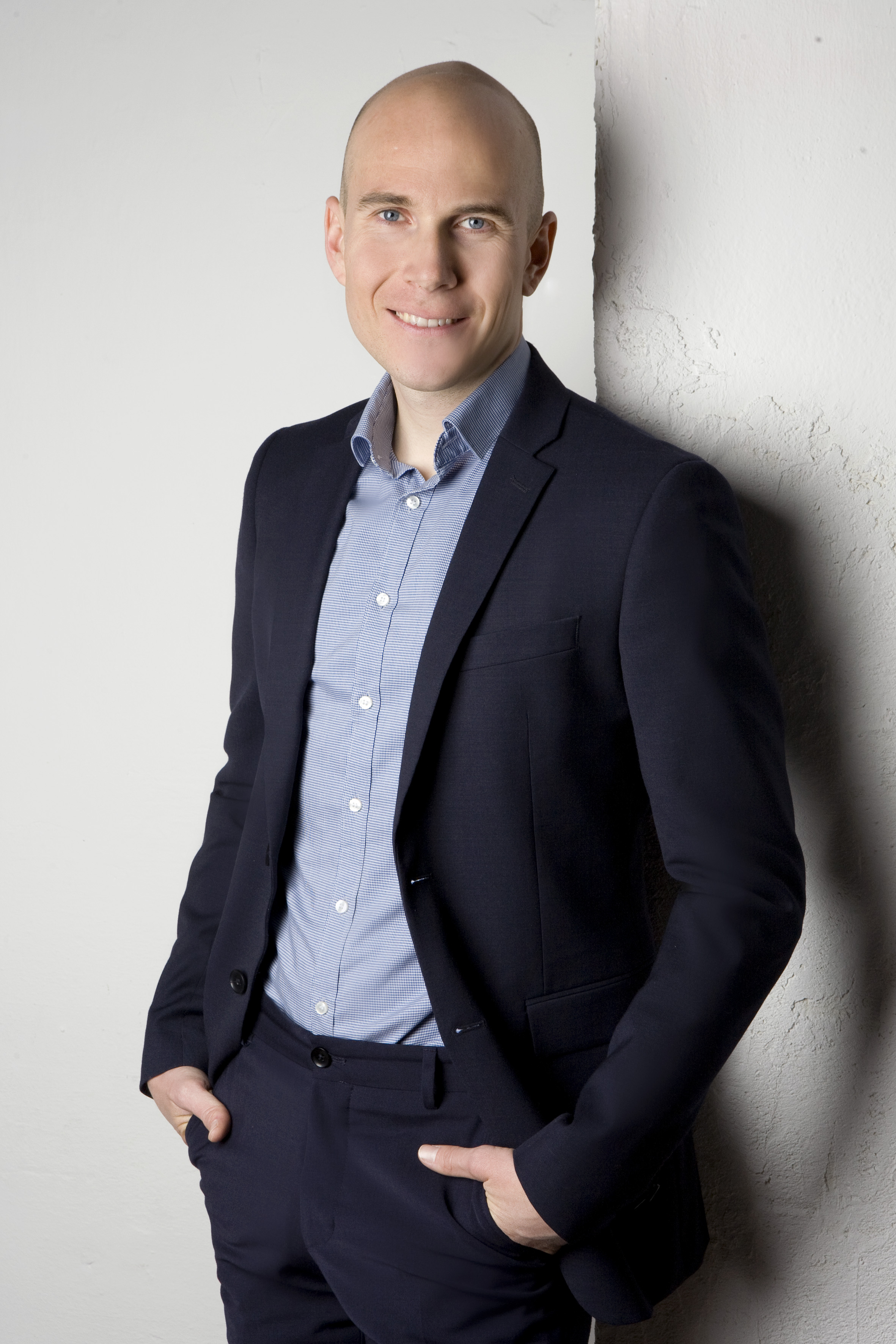
Thilo Hagendorff (2024)

Thilo Hagendorff (born 1987) is a German AI researcher, author, world record holder and former extreme sports athlete.

== Career ==
Hagendorff studied at the University of Konstanz and received his doctorate from the University of Tübingen. He then began working there as a postdoctoral researcher, including in the Cluster of Excellence "Machine Learning: New Perspectives for Science.” He has conducted research at Stanford University, the University of California, San Diego, and ELLIS Alicante. He lectures at the Hasso Plattner Institute in Potsdam, among other places. He is currently a research group leader at the University of Stuttgart. His research focuses on AI safety.

== Journalistic and scientific work ==
Hagendorff is the author of numerous scientific papers, articles, and books. His latest book, Was sich am Fleisch entscheidet (What is decided by meat), deals with issues of animal and environmental ethics. Drawing on previously little-noticed research findings, he shows how both ecological and social crises have their roots in a problematic human-animal relationship. He criticizes the industrial use and killing of animals.

In his book Das Ende der Informationskontrolle and various other specialist essays, Hagendorff also dealt with topics related to computer science and technology ethics. His most important works are relevant to AI safety. Hagendorff has also appeared as a speaker or interview partner at numerous conferences, such as Re:publica, companies, and in various media outlets. He has won several Science slams.

== Sports ==
In 2021, Hagendorff broke the world record for the most meters climbed by bicycle in 12 hours. In 2020, he cycled 500 kilometers in one go through Baden-Württemberg in 17 hours for a good cause. He has won races in both road cycling and mountain biking.

== Selected publications ==
- Hagendorff, Thilo (2014a). P – Pessimismus (in German). Hamburg: Textem Verlag. ISBN 978-3-941613-87-4.
- Hagendorff, Thilo (2014b). Sozialkritik und soziale Steuerung: Zur Methodologie systemangepasster Aufklärung (in German). Bielefeld: Transcript. ISBN 978-3-8376-2660-5.
- Hagendorff, Thilo (2017). Das Ende der Informationskontrolle: Zur Nutzung digitaler Medien jenseits von Privatheit und Datenschutz (in German). Bielefeld: Transcript Verlag. ISBN 978-3-8376-3777-9.
- Hagendorff, Thilo (24 February 2021). Was sich am Fleisch entscheidet: Über die politische Bedeutung von Tieren [What is decided by meat: On the political significance of animals] (in German). Marburg: Büchner. ISBN 978-3-96317-237-3.
- Abbou, Kenza Ait Si; Hagendorff, Thilo; Hacker, Philipp; Krüger, Antonio; Ommer, Björn; Schmid, Ute; Spielkamp, Matthias; Zweig, Katharina (17 January 2026). "Künstliche Intelligenz: Was das schlimmste KI-Szenario wäre" [Artificial intelligence: What would be the worst-case AI scenario]. Die Zeit (in German).
