= Werner Gruber =

Austrian physicist and author

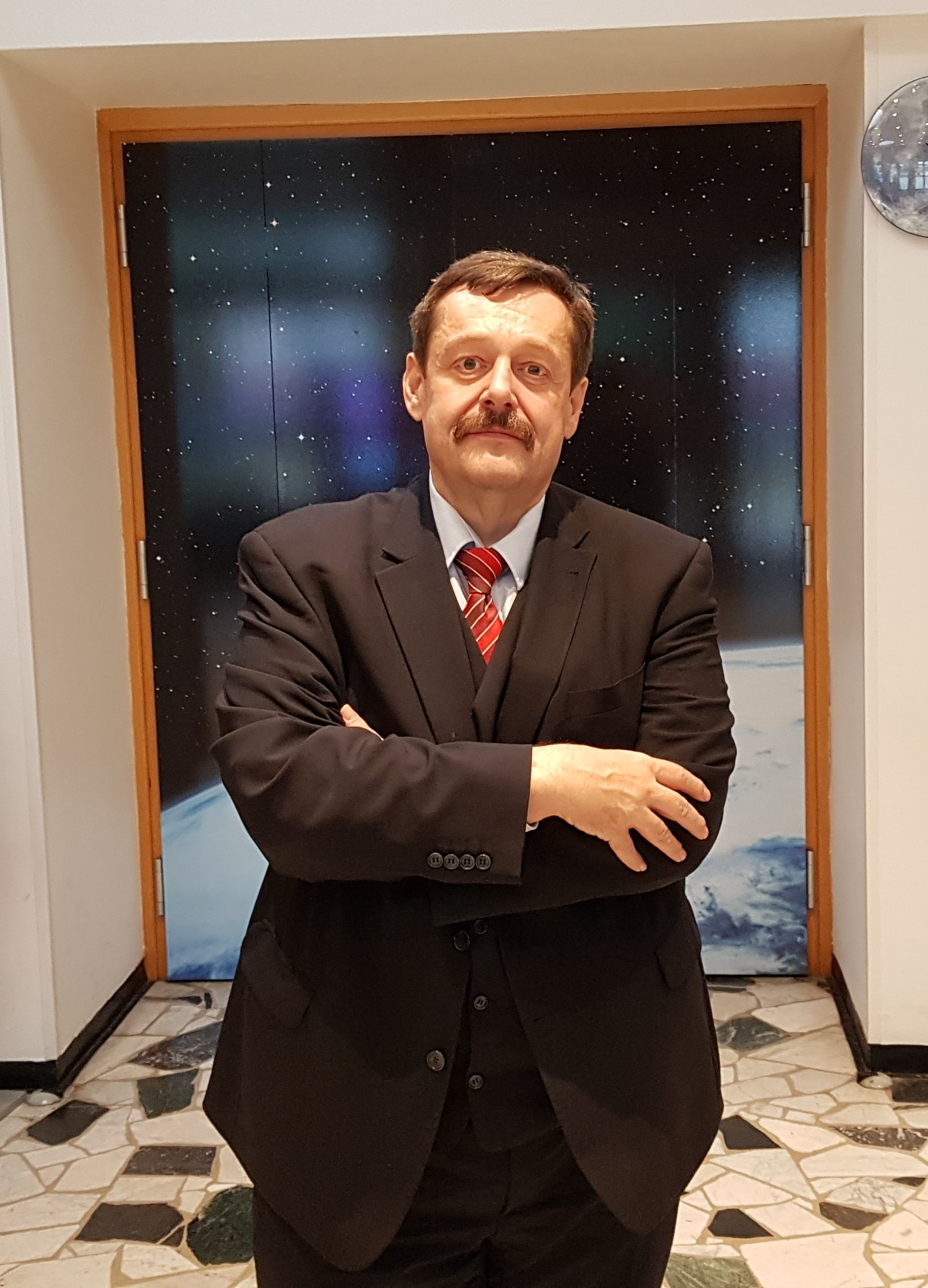
Gruber

Werner Gruber (born 15 March 1970) is an Austrian physicist, author, lecturer, and cabaret artist and is well known from ORF and as a member of the Social Democratic Party of Austria (SPÖ).

== Biography ==
Gruber was born in Ostermiething. Gruber grew up in Ansfelden, Upper Austria and graduated in 1999 with a degree in physics from the University of Vienna. He then worked as a research assistant at the Institute for Experimental Physics at the University of Vienna. Since February 2013 Gruber manages the astronomical institutions of the Adult Education centers in Vienna – the Planetarium Wien, the Kuffner Observatory and the Urania Observatory. He teaches the introduction to physics at the Medical Faculty of the Sigmund Freud University Vienna, and at the Institute of Experimental Physic at the University of Vienna.

After performing on 26 September 2015, Gruber suffered a cardiac arrest, which he survived thanks to a prompt cardiac massage by his colleague Puntigam and a rapid successor rescue chain. He was then implanted with a pacemaker with a defibrillator and an internet connection. To be a "Sudden Death with Brain" he described in October 2015 as a great luck. Gruber had previously tried to reduce excess weight to reduce the resulting health risks. After the operative training of a Gastric bypass surgery, he has lost 50 kg until November 2015.

Gruber is also an active member of the Social Democratic Party of Austria.

=== Popular scientific work ===
Gruber became known through popular scientific treatment of everyday physics in adult education courses in Vienna ("The Science of Star Trek", "The Physics of Paper Flying", "Culinary Physics"), in columns and on television appearances. With the theoretical physicist Heinz Oberhummer and the cabaret artist Martin Puntigam, he designed and presented the science cabaret Science Busters at the Rabenhof Theater in Vienna. In these events, science was presented in an entertaining way. The Science Busters also presented in this lineup a weekly radio column on the youth radio station FM4 of the ORF. In February 2016, after Heinz Oberhummer's death, Gruber announced to leave the Science Busters, citing health problems of his own.

In 2012, Gruber was awarded the Vienna Prize for Public Education. 2013, this book Gedankenlesen durch Schneckenstreicheln (together with Martin Puntigam and Heinz Oberhummer) was awarded as Knowledge Book of the Year.

In early 2010 Gruber became known for a demonstration of the ineffectiveness of full body scanners, which are to be introduced in the security control at airports, on ZDF. In 2015, Gruber gave an interview to the Austrian newspaper Kurier, where he said that human impact played a formative role on climate change.

Together with Heinz Oberhummer, Gruber acted as a Klingon in two promotional videos from the Volkshochschule Wien in January 2015. In both videos Klingon was spoken to illustrate the diversity of the VHS language offering.

== Publications (selection) ==
- Flirten mit den Sternen. Ecowin, Elsbethen bei Salzburg 2019, ISBN 978-3-7110-0186-3.
- (with Heinz Oberhummer und Martin Puntigam): Das Universum ist eine Scheißgegend. Carl Hanser Verlag, 2015, ISBN 978-3-446-44477-5.
- (with Heinz Oberhummer und Martin Puntigam): Gedankenlesen durch Schneckenstreicheln. Was wir von Tieren über Physik lernen können. Carl Hanser Verlag, 2012, ISBN 978-3-446-43215-4.
- (with Heinz Oberhummer and Martin Puntigam): Wer nichts weiß, muss alles glauben. Ecowin Verlag, 2010.
- (with Natascha Riahi and Christian Rupp): Die kleine Sonne auf großer Fahrt. Bildungsverlag EINS, Troisdorf 2010.
- Die Genussformel: Kulinarische Physik Ecowin Verlag, 25. August 2008. ISBN 978-3-902404-59-6
- Unglaublich einfach. Einfach unglaublich. Physik für jeden Tag. Ecowin Verlag, Salzburg 2006. ISBN 978-3-902404-37-4
- (with Natascha Riahi and Christian Rupp): Die Reise der kleinen Sonne. Bildungsverlag EINS, Troisdorf 2006, ISBN 978-3-427-50088-9.
- Hollywood und die Physik, Facultas-Verlag, Wien 2006.

== Links ==
- Literature by and about Werner Gruber in the German National Library catalogue
- Brain-Modelling: Physikalische Modelle über das Gehirn. Lecture by Werner Gruber at the University of Vienna.
- Website Science Busters.
- Zum Glück verstehen Terroristen nichts von Physik. (ger) Interview at Heise.de.
