= Ostermiething =

- Municipality
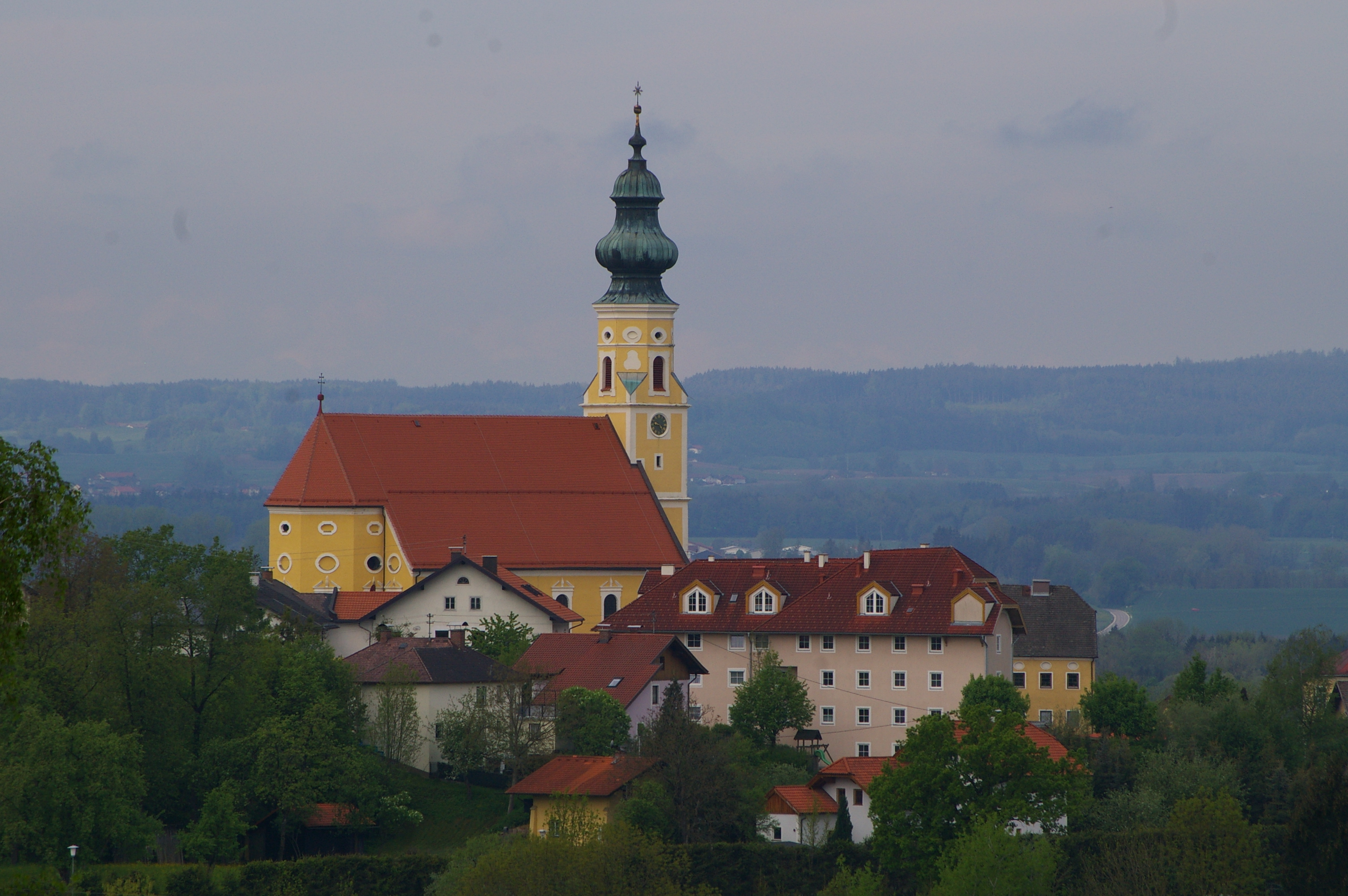

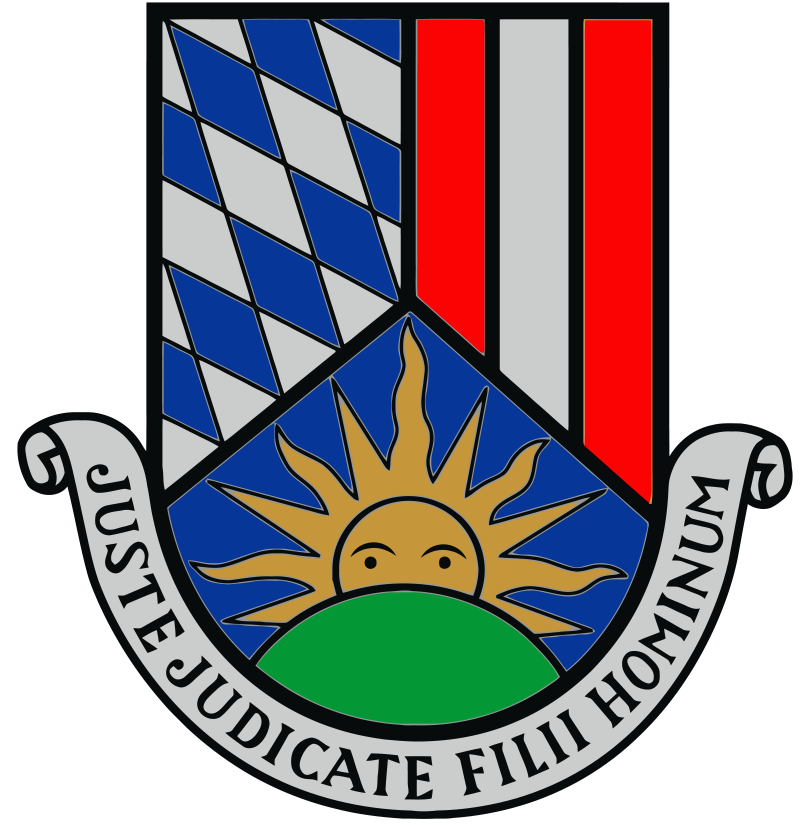
- Coat of arms

- Location within Austria
- Coordinates: 48°02′50″N 12°49′50″E
- Country: Austria
- State: Upper Austria
- District: Braunau am Inn

Government
  - Mayor: Gerhard Holzner (ÖVP)

Area
  - Total: 21.76 km^{2} (8.40 sq mi)
- Elevation: 423 m (1,388 ft)

Population (2018-01-01)
  - Total: 3,296
  - Density: 151.5/km^{2} (392.3/sq mi)
- Time zone: UTC+1 (CET)
  - Summer (DST): UTC+2 (CEST)
- Postal code: 5121
- Area code: 06278
- Vehicle registration: BR
- Website: www.ostermiething.at

Ostermiething is a municipality in the district of Braunau am Inn in the Austrian state of Upper Austria.

== Geography ==
Ostermiething lies in the upper Innviertel on the western edge of the Weilhart forest directly across the Salzach from Germany. There is a bridge to the Bavarian town of Tittmoning.

== People ==
- Werner Gruber (born 1970), Austrian physicist, author, professor
