= Isabella Eckerle =

German virologist

- Born: Speyer
- Education: Heidelberg University
- Known for: Virology
- Scientific career
- Workplaces: University Hospital Heidelberg; University of Bonn
- Academic advisors: Christian Drosten

Isabella Eckerle is a German virologist who is the co-Head of the Centre for Emerging Viral Diseases at the Geneva University Hospitals and the University of Geneva. Her research considers infectious diseases and the development of cell lines that allow a better understanding of their epidemiology. During the COVID-19 pandemic, Eckerle studied the difference in response of adults and children to coronavirus disease.

== Early life and education ==
Eckerle was born in Speyer, Rhineland-Palatinate. As a child she wanted to be a veterinarian or a field biologist, but ended up studying medicine at Heidelberg University. During her final year of medical school she visited Africa, which inspired her to work in infectious diseases. She decided to specialize in tropical pathogens, and spent her early medical career working in the Department of Tropical Medicine at the University Hospital Heidelberg. As a junior doctor Eckerle investigated the pathogenesis of travellers returning to Germany from abroad. She focussed on viruses of zoonotic origin.

== Research and career ==
Eckerle moved to the University of Bonn Institute of Virology, where she worked with Christian Drosten on emerging zoonotic viruses. Here Eckerle studied renal epithelial cell lines of various reservoir hosts, including bats, rodents and insectivores. Until the works of Eckerle, the isolation of bat-borne viruses in cell culture had been challenging. Eckerle created an experimental approach to instantly freeze the organs of specimens, so-called cryo-conservation, allowing her access to cells from a variety of rare species. She visited Ghana and Gabon as part of field work missions to study and collect bat species.

In 2018 Eckerle was made a Professor at the University of Geneva, where she studies exotic cell lines. Eckerle works with other physicians, veterinarians and microbiologists, to better understand the epidemiology of emerging viruses. Eckerle looks to develop cell culture models to better understand the epidemiology of emerging diseases. She has made use of artificial intelligence to generate the cell lines of small mammals from a diverse range of geographical locations, and then allows viruses to replicate in these algorithm-generated cell cultures in controlled laboratory setting. Using these cell lines, Eckerle demonstrated that ungulates, including goats and camels, were likely intermediate hosts of middle East respiratory syndrome (MERS).

At the Geneva University Hospitals, she is co-head of the Center for Emerging Viral Diseases.

In the early days of the COVID-19 pandemic, Eckerle was one of several Swiss physicians who requested access to the Early Warning and Response System; the European Union's network that looks to track the spread of infectious diseases. She argued that better epidemiology, pathogenesis and treatment options were essential in the global fight against coronavirus disease. In late April 2020, a serological antibody test in Geneva revealed that only 5.5% of the population had been exposed to the disease, which Eckerle described as "smaller than hoped for,". Eckerle investigated the different responses of adults and children to coronavirus disease. In particular, Eckerle studied the presence of SARS-CoV-2 in the upper respiratory tracts of neonates, children and teenagers. In early May, Eckerle reported that children who fell ill with coronavirus disease were just as infectious as adults. She investigated the viral loads of children and adults, and showed that whilst children can have a more mild form of the disease, there was little difference between the number of SARS-CoV-2 particles carried by adults and children. She was awarded funding from the Swiss National Science Foundation to investigate the reaction of the pulmonary epithelium to SARS-CoV-2 infection, in an effort to create diagnostic guidelines that help healthcare workers evaluate whether someone will contract a mild or severe form of disease.

== Selected publications ==
- Corman, V.M. (Victor) Eckerle, I. Bleicker, T. Zaki, A. Landt, O. Eschbach-Bludau, M. (Monika) Boheemen, S. (Sander) van Gopal, R. (Robin) Ballhause, M. Bestebroer, T.M. (Theo) Muth, D. Müller, M.A. (Marcel) Drexler, J.-F. (Jan-Felix) Zambon, M.C. (Maria) Osterhaus, A.D.M.E. (Albert) Fouchier, R.A.M. (Ron) Drosten, C. (Christian) (1 September 2012). "Detection of a novel human coronavirus by real-time reverse-transcription polymerase chain reaction". Euro Surveillance. 17 (39). doi:10.2807/ese.17.39.20285-en. hdl:1765/87211. OCLC 957098828. PMID 23041020.
- Müller, Marcel A.; Raj, V. Stalin; Muth, Doreen; Meyer, Benjamin; Kallies, Stephan; Smits, Saskia L.; Wollny, Robert; Bestebroer, Theo M.; Specht, Sabine; Suliman, Tasnim; Zimmermann, Katrin (31 December 2012). "Human Coronavirus EMC Does Not Require the SARS-Coronavirus Receptor and Maintains Broad Replicative Capability in Mammalian Cell Lines". mBio. 3 (6). doi:10.1128/mBio.00515-12. ISSN 2150-7511. PMC 3520110. PMID 23232719.
- Eckerle, Isabella; Corman, Victor M.; Müller, Marcel A.; Lenk, Matthias; Ulrich, Rainer G.; Drosten, Christian (February 2014). "Replicative Capacity of MERS Coronavirus in Livestock Cell Lines". Emerging Infectious Diseases. 20 (2): 276–9. doi:10.3201/eid2002.131182. ISSN 1080-6040. PMC 3901466. PMID 24457147.
