= Cinema and Science =

Cinema and Science (CISCI) is a European educational project of the Austrian physicist Heinz Oberhummer. It is funded by the European Commission and was awarded of being a star project. CISCI describes and explains scientific as well as pseudo-scientific contents with the help of popular movies in eight European languages. The analyses and descriptions of movie scenes for pupils and teachers is provided on a free web-based data bank. With CISCI education in science will be more interesting and pupils can be motivated to participate more in science education. The contents are continuously supplemented by scientists and teachers as well as scientifically and didactically reviewed under co-ordination of the Vienna University of Technology.

== Literature ==
- H. Oberhummer: Cinema and Science (CISCI) – A New Innovative On-Line Educational Environment. In Proceedings of the EDEN 2006 Annual Conference, Vienna, Austria, 2006, p. 154-159
