= Nuclei in the Cosmos =

Nuclear astrophysics research conference

- Abbreviation: NIC
- Discipline: Nuclear astrophysics

Publication details
- History: Founded 1990
- Frequency: Biennial

Nuclei in the Cosmos (NIC) is an internationally hosted series of biennial nuclear astrophysics conferences. Bringing together nuclear scientists and astronomers, it has served as the primary forum within the field leading it to be called "the most important international meeting in the field of nuclear astrophysics". Prior to the conference, a school for graduate students and postdocs is held along with a pre-workshop. The conference series was initiated by Heinz Oberhummer and Claus Rolfs with the first held in 1990 in Austria and rotates internationally.

== Conferences ==
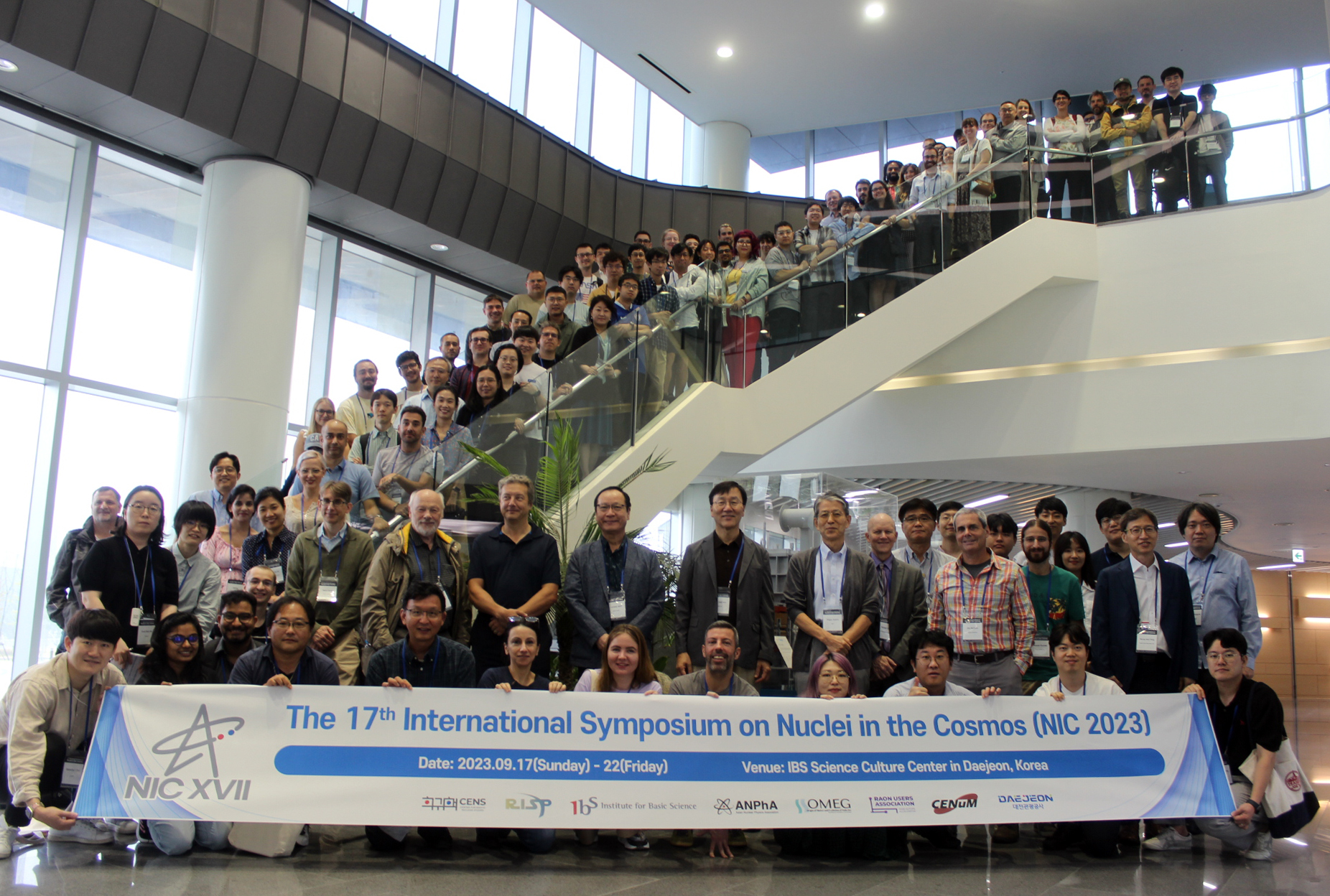
Participants of NIC-XVII on an excursion to the Rare isotope Accelerator complex for ON-line experiment (RAON) of the Institute for Rare Isotope Science (IRIS) in Daejeon, South Korea.

- 1990 NIC-I Austria
- 1992 NIC-II Germany
- 1994 NIC-III Italy
- 1996 NIC-IV United States
- 1998 NIC-V Greece
- 2000 NIC-VI Denmark
- 2002 NIC-VII Japan
- 2004 NIC-VIII Canada
- 2006 NIC-IX Switzerland/France
- 2008 NIC X United States
- 2010 NIC-XI Germany
- 2012 NIC-XII Australia
- 2014 NIC-XIII Hungary
- 2016 NIC-XIV Japan
- 2018 NIC-XV Italy
- 2021 NIC-XVI China
- 2023 NIC-XVII South Korea
- 2025 NIC-XVIII Spain

== See also ==
- Joint Institute for Nuclear Astrophysics
