= Nicolas Wöhrl =

German physicist, science communicator and podcaster

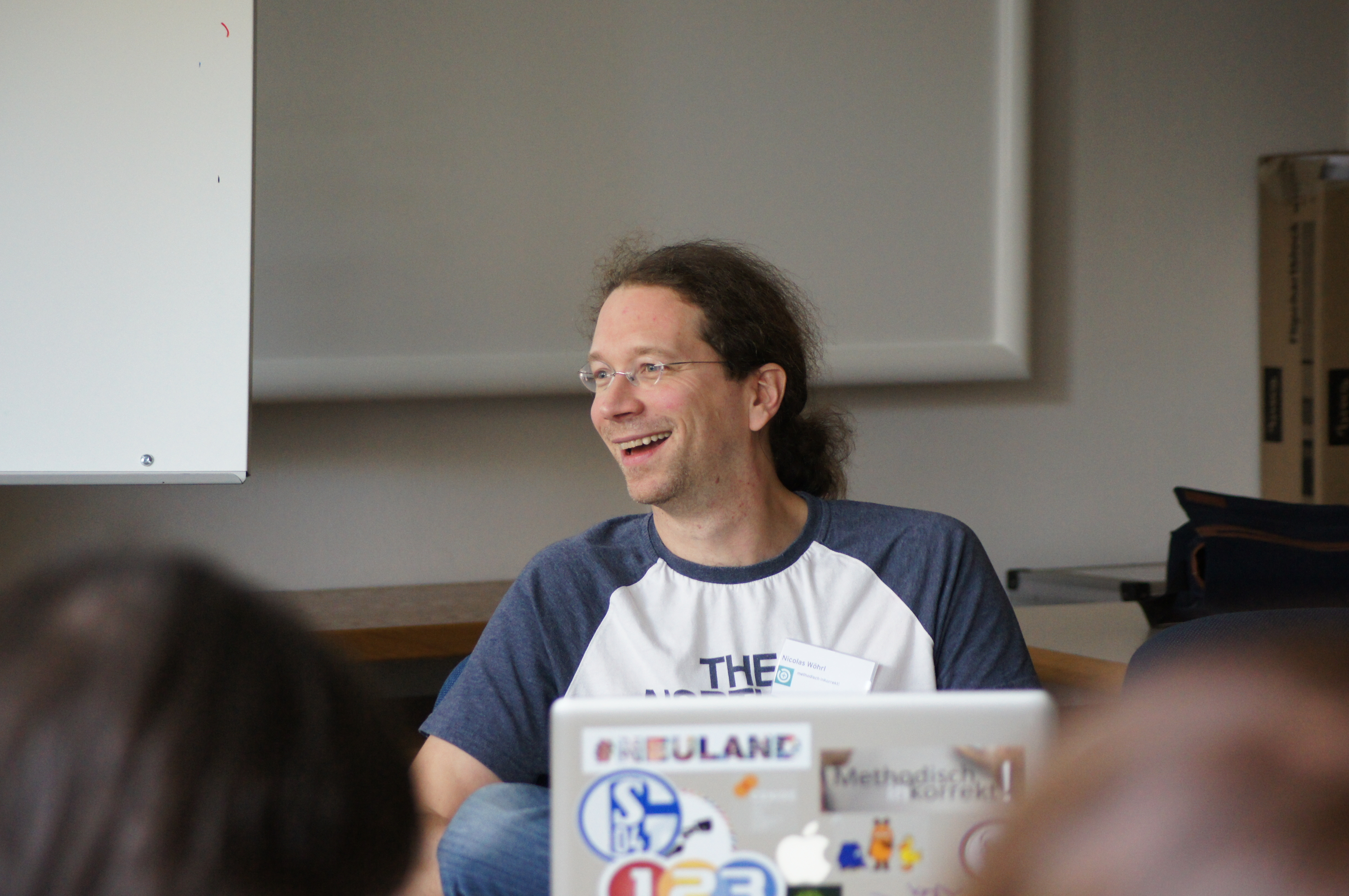
Nicolas Wöhrl 2016

Nicolas Wöhrl (born 25 April 1974 in Recklinghausen) is a German physicist, science communicator and podcaster.

== Biography ==
Nicolas Wöhrl was born in Recklinghausen, Germany the son of Thomas Wöhrl, a geophysicist and Magdalene Wöhrl, a magistrate.

=== Academic career ===
Wöhrl attended Gelsenkirchen Grundschule (primary school), then Realschule (mid-level secondary school in Germany) and Schalker Gymnasium Gelsenkirchen (top-level secondary school in Germany) until June 1993. After completing his civilian service, he studied physics at the University of Duisburg-Essen. He graduated as a physics engineer in September 1999. His dissertation was titled "Improving the Biocompatibility of Stents by Carbon Based Layers". In May 2003, he completed a master's thesis on the production of hard carbon layers.

From July 2003 to April 2007, Wöhrl worked as a research assistant in technical physics at Volker Buck. He worked on the topic "Deposition and Characterization of Nanocrystalline Diamond Layers", conducted physical internships for physicians, and supervised graduate students. From May 2007 to October 2009, he worked at IPLAS GmbH Troisdorf as a senior scientist in the research and development department. He worked on process development for the Plasma CVD, the homoepitactic carbon layers, and building a production line.

In April 2010, he received the title Doctor of Natural Sciences.

From November 2009 to February 2013, Wöhrl again worked as a research assistant at Volker Buck at the Center for Nanointegration Duisburg-Essen at the University of Duisburg-Essen. From March 2013 to January 2016, he was a research associate in the Inorganic Chemistry department of the University of Duisburg-Essen with Stephan Schulz.

Since 2013 he has been the spokesperson for the Young Researcher Network (YRN) at the University of Duisburg-Essen. In February 2016 he began working in experimental physics at the University of Duisburg-Essen with professor Axel Lorke.

== Research ==
Wöhrl's specialty is the synthesis and characterization (nano) of structured carbon layers. His work on nanotechnologyat the University of Duisburg-Essen is integrated into the Center for Nanointegration University-Duisburg (CENIDE). Its range extends from crystalline structures (diamond - single crystals, nanocrystalline diamond layers) through low-dimensional structures (graphene, carbon nanowalls) to amorphous carbon layers (aC, aC: H). For the synthesis of these structures, both PVD and plasma-assisted CVD methods are used. The plant concepts used include microwaves, radio frequency (RF), and various arc processes. With these systems and methods, Wöhrl has made important contributions to the development and modelling of synthetic processes for these materials. Among other things, he realized one of the first depositions of grapheme of the direct plasma method in Germany.

In his doctoral thesis, he dealt with the production of nanocrystalline and ultrananocrystalline diamond layers with specific properties, demonstrating the role of the amorphous carbon matrix in these layers on many material properties.

In the field of single-crystal diamond layers, Wöhrl investigates the formation and properties of near-surface spin centers in high-purity diamond. He investigates the influence of structure and termination of the surface on the underlying spin centers and their properties.

In 2016 he worked on the miniaturization of conventional fuel cell concepts by maximizing electrochemical active surface by using carbon nanowalls. By using innovative plasma processes and catalyst or electrolyte materials, the electrode n of the micro fuel cells' electrochemical performance was specifically improved.

In addition to material synthesis, surface modifications by plasma processes and the characterization of these plasmas also belong to his field of activity with different methods such as optical emission spectroscopy and mass spectrometry.

== Science communication and podcast Methodically Incorrect! ==
In addition to his work at the university, Wöhrl is involved in various areas of scientific communication. He appears as an expert on television programs such as 1, 2 or 3,) Galileo, and on the Livestream channel of Rocket Beans TV.

On various occasions, he has participated in popular science lectures and science slams.

Wöhrl has been working together with his colleague Reinhard Remfort on podcasts since May 8, 2013. In January 2017, they were attracting approximately 70,000 downloads per episode.

Since 2014, there have been some podcasts of the podcast, including an evening event at the Chaos Communication Congress.

Wöhrl is co-founder of the curated directory of knowledge podcasts Wissenschaftspodcasts, which aims to strengthen the potential of podcasts for knowledge transfer.

== Personal life ==
Nicolas Wöhrl is married and lives with his wife and two children in Gelsenkirchen.

In his spare time, Wöhrl plays drums in the Progressive Metal band Path Zero (previously Requiem) and practices triathlon.

== Publications ==
- Wöhrl, Nicolas & Buck, Volker (2007). Influence of Hydrogen on the Residual Stress in Nanocrystalline Diamond Films. Diamond and Related Materials, Volume 16 (Issues 4–7 April - July 2007), 748–762. doi:10.1016/j.diamond.2006.11.059
- Buck, Volker & Wöhrl, Nicolas (2008). Tailoring the Matrix in Ultra-Nanocrystalline Diamond Films. Japanese Journal of Applied Physics (Volume 47 - Number 10S - 17 October 2008). doi.org/10.1143/JJAP.47.8208
- Wöhrl, N., Hirte, T., Posth, O., Buck, V. (2009).Investigation of the Coefficient of Thermal Expansion in Nanocrystalline Diamond Films. Diamond and Related Materials, Volume 18. (Issues 2–3, February–March 2009), 224–228. doi.org/10.1016/j.diamond.2008.10.016
- Sharma, Rishi, Wöhrl, Nicolas, Barhai, P.K., Buck, V. (2010) Nucleation Density Enhancement for Nanocrystalline Diamond Films. Journal of Optoelectronics and Advanced Materials. (12(9):1915-1920 · September 2010).
- Wöhrl, Nicolas; Buck, Volker (2010). The meaning of the matrix in nanocrystalline diamond layers. Bad Saulgau: Eugen G. Leuze Verlag. pp. 196–205.
- Wöhrl, Nicolas; Buck, Volker (2011). Ultrananocrystalline Diamond as Material for Surface Acoustic Wave Devices. Rijeka: INTECH Open Access Publisher. ISBN 978-953-307-572-3.
- Wöhrl, Nicolas; Buck, Volker (2011). "The meaning of the matrix in nanocrystalline diamond layers". Galvanotechnik: Älteste Fachzeitschrift für die Praxis der Oberflächenbehandlung: 2748–2757. ISSN 0016-4232.
- Wöhrl, Nicolas; Buck, Volker; Schulz, Stephan (2013). Against (conventional) electricity - Non-classical thermoelectrics with non-classical methods. food: University of Duisburg-Essen.
- Wöhrl, Nicolas; Buck, Volker; Ulrich Köhler, Dieter Suter (2016). color centers in the crystal. Duisburg-Essed: University of Duisburg-Essen.
- Wöhrl, Nicolas; Buck, Volker; Gottlieb, Steven. Conductive Thin Film CVD: Graphene. Hauppauge, NY: Nova Science Publishing. pp. 31–50.
