= Sandra Ciesek =

German virologist researching emergent viruses

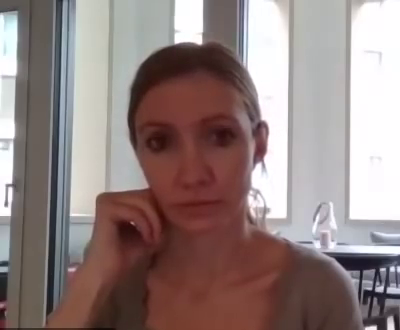
Ciesek in 2021

Sandra Ciesek (German pronunciation: [ˈzandʁa ˈt͡siːzɛk]; born 1978) is a German physician and virologist. She is the director of the Institute of Medical Virology at the Universitätsklinikum Frankfurt and professor of medical virology at the Goethe University Frankfurt. Her main areas of research include new forms of therapy for hepatitis C and, more recently, the search for drugs against COVID-19.

== Career ==
Ciesek was born in Goslar in 1978. She studied medicine from 1997 to 2003 at the University of Göttingen and at the Hannover Medical School (MHH), where she received her doctorate in 2004 with a thesis on the influence of certain dendritic cells on hepatitis C infection. She was able to prove that these cells can destroy infected cells – which is no longer the case in hepatitis C patients, so that this could be a cause for the development of a chronic hepatitis C infection. The dissertation was awarded several prizes

Following her doctorate, she worked there until 2009, initially as an assistant doctor

From 2009 to 2012, she worked as a research assistant in a DFG-funded project at Twincore, a joint research facility of the MHH and the Helmholtz Centre for Infection Research, where she researched new therapeutic approaches for hepatitis C. At the same time, she habilitated in experimental gastroenterology in 2011 with a thesis on optimal immunsuppression in hepatitis C patients after liver transplantation. In 2013, she completed her specialist examination in Internal medicine and gastroenterology.

From 2011 to 2016, Ciesek has been head of the Viral Hepatitis Research Group at the MHH, where she was appointed associate professor of internal medicine at the beginning of 2016 Shortly afterwards, in March 2016, she was appointed professor of virology at the Medical Faculty of the University of Duisburg-Essen and became deputy head of the Institute of Virology. She completed a second specialist training in microbiology, virology and infectious disease epidemiology Infektionsepidemiologie by 2018, at about the same time as she obtained her master's degree in public health administration at University of Erlangen–Nuremberg.

Since spring 2019, Sandra Ciesek is the director of the Institute of Medical Virology at the University Hospital Frankfurt and is professor of medical virology at the Goethe University Frankfurt. In 2020, she plays a key role in research on SARS-CoV-2, the novel coronavirus. In February 2020, she and her team were able to prove that symptom-free individuals can also be carriers and thus vectors of the virus. After the outbreak of the pandemic Ciesek received a grant of 250,000 euros from the Johanna-Quandt-Stiftung in March 2020 within 24 hours of the application being submitted for the search for effective drugs against COVID-19.

Ciesek is a member of various guideline groups as well as national and international professional societies Ciesek is one of the two virologists interviewed by Norddeutscher Rundfunk (NDR) science journalists for the Coronavirus Update Podcast being the guest every two weeks while fellow virologist Christian Drosten fills that spot every other two weeks.

Ciesek was nominated by Alliance 90/The Greens as delegate to the Federal Conventions for the purpose of electing the president of Germany in 2022.

== Personal life ==
Ciesek is married and mother of a daughter (born 2013)

== Awards ==
- 2004: Doctoral Prize of the Society of Friends of the Hannover Medical School
- 2004: Ismar Boas Prize for outstanding dissertations of the Deutschen Gesellschaft für Gastroenterologie, Verdauungs- und Stoffwechselkrankheiten
- 2010: Martin-Gülzow-Preis der Deutschen Gesellschaft für Gastroenterologie, Verdauungs- und Stoffwechselkrankheiten
- 2011: Präventionspreis der Deutschen Gesellschaft für Innere Medizin

== Selected publications ==
- Hoehl, Sebastian; Rabenau, Holger; Berger, Annemarie; Kortenbusch, Marhild; Cinatl, Jindrich; Bojkova, Denisa; Behrens, Pia; Böddinghaus, Boris; Götsch, Udo; Naujoks, Frank; Neumann, Peter; Schork, Joscha; Tiarks-Jungk, Petra; Walczok, Antoni; Eickmann, Markus; Vehreschild, Maria J.G.T.; Kann, Gerrit; Wolf, Timo; Gottschalk, René; Ciesek, Sandra (2020-02-18), "Evidence of SARS-CoV-2 Infection in Returning Travelers from Wuhan, China", New England Journal of Medicine, 382 (13): 1278–1280, doi:10.1056/NEJMc2001899, PMC 7121749, PMID 32069388 in The New England Journal of Medicine
- Corman, Victor M.; Rabenau, Holger F.; Adams, Ortwin; Oberle, Doris; Funk, Markus B.; Keller-Stanislawski, Brigitte; Timm, Joerg; Drosten, Christian; Ciesek, Sandra (2020-03-29), "SARS-CoV-2 asymptomatic and symptomatic patients and risk for transfusion transmission", Transfusion, 60 (6): 1119–1122, doi:10.1111/trf.15841, PMC 7267331, PMID 32361996, S2CID 216215455 in Transfusion
- Eis-Huebinger, Anna Maria; Hoenemann, Mario; Wenzel, Juergen J.; Berger, Annemarie; Widera, Marek; Schmidt, Barbara; Aldabbagh, Souhaib; Marx, Benjamin; Streeck, Hendrik; Ciesek, Sandra; Liebert, Uwe G.; Huzly, Daniela; Hengel, Hartmut; Panning, Marcus (2020-03-29), "Ad hoc laboratory-based surveillance of SARS-CoV-2 by real-time RT-PCR using minipools of RNA prepared from routine respiratory samples", Journal of Clinical Virology, 127 104381, doi:10.1016/j.jcv.2020.104381, PMC 7175872, PMID 32344319
