= Claus Rolfs =

German physicist

Claus E. Rolfs (born 1941 in Bad Peterstal) is a German experimental physicist, known for his laboratory research related to nuclear astrophysics. He is a co-initiator of Nuclei in the Cosmos.

== Biography ==
Rolfs went to school in Offenburg and studied physics at the University of Freiburg. From 1973 he was a close associate of William A. Fowler at Caltech, where Rolfs was a Millikan Fellow. In the 1970s and 1980s Rolfs was a professor at the University of Münster. He was a professor at the Ruhr University Bochum from 1990 to 2007, when he retired as professor emeritus. He lives in Münster. In 1980 he was a visiting professor at Ohio State University.

Rolfs has collaborated in many laboratory experiments that collect data on the nuclear fusion reactions that also take place in the Sun.

Beginning in 2005 he considered radical, new ideas concerning the treatment of radioactive waste. In 2006 he and his team published the highly controversial indications of their experiments involving beta-decay. Rolfs claimed that "by encasing certain radioisotopes in metal and chilling them close to absolute zero, it ought to be possible to slash their half-lives from millennia to just a few years." However, the alleged change in half-life has been disconfirmed by subsequent experiments. The uranium isotope ratios are also identical in various uranium ore deposits worldwide, indicating that, in the natural history of planet Earth, the half-lives of uranium's radioactive isotopes are significantly influenced by neither the temperature nor the chemical environment — although isotopic signatures can be affected by "reduction of uranium to UO_{2} or chemical precipitation in the form of U^{6+} minerals."

Rolfs is the author or co-author of over 450 articles and is also the author of several books in German for young people.

In 1972 he was the representative of Canada at the IAEA in Vienna. In 1979 he received the Roentgen Prize of the University of Gießen. He has several honorary doctorates (Naples, Catania, Lisbon). In 2006 he received the Saha Memorial Prize in Calcutta and in 1989 the Belgian-German Humboldt Prize. In 2010 he received the Hans A. Bethe Prize for "seminal contributions to the experimental determination of nuclear cross-sections in stars, including the first direct measurement of the key ^{3}He fusion reaction at solar conditions.".

Rolfs plays several musical instruments.

His doctoral students include Michael Wiescher.

== Selected publications ==
=== Articles ===
- Rolfs, C. (1973). "Spectroscopic factors from radiative capture reactions". Nuclear Physics A. 217 (1): 29–70. Bibcode:1973NuPhA.217...29R. doi:10.1016/0375-9474(73)90622-2.
- Rolfs, C.; Trautvetter, H. P. (1978). "Experimental Nuclear Astrophysics". Annual Review of Nuclear and Particle Science. 28: 115–159. Bibcode:1978ARNPS..28..115R. doi:10.1146/annurev.ns.28.120178.000555.
- Rolfs, C. (1986). "Laboratory approaches of nuclear reactions involved in primordial and stellar nucleosynthesis". Progress in Particle and Nuclear Physics. 17: 365–391. Bibcode:1986PrPNP..17..365R. doi:10.1016/0146-6410(86)90026-8.
- Krauss, A.; Becker, H.W.; Trautvetter, H.P.; Rolfs, C.; Brand, K. (1987). "Low-energy fusion cross sections of D + D and D + ^{3}He reactions". Nuclear Physics A. 465 (1): 150–172. Bibcode:1987NuPhA.465..150K. doi:10.1016/0375-9474(87)90302-2.
- Rolfs, C.; Barnes, C. A. (1990). "Radiative Capture Reactions in Nuclear Astrophysics". Annual Review of Nuclear and Particle Science. 40: 45–78. Bibcode:1990ARNPS..40...45R. doi:10.1146/annurev.ns.40.120190.000401.
- Langanke, K.; Reusch, H.-G.; Rolfs, C. (1990). "Monte Carlo simulations of the Lewis effect". Zeitschrift für Physik A. 336 (4): 403–410. Bibcode:1990ZPhyA.336..403L. doi:10.1007/BF01294114. S2CID 122617777.
- Langanke, K.; Rolfs, C. (1993). "Nukleosynthese in homogenen und inhomogenen Urknallmodellen". Physik Journal. 49: 31–36. doi:10.1002/phbl.19930490112. (Nucleosynthesis in homogeneous and inhomogeneous Big Bang models)
- Adelberger, Eric G.; et al. (1998). "Solar fusion cross sections". Reviews of Modern Physics. 70 (4): 1265–1291. arXiv:astro-ph/9805121. Bibcode:1998RvMP...70.1265A. doi:10.1103/RevModPhys.70.1265. hdl:1969.1/183165. S2CID 16061677.
- Angulo, C.; Arnould, M.; Rayet, M.; Descouvemont, P.; Baye, D.; Leclercq-Willain, C.; Coc, A.; Barhoumi, S.; Aguer, P.; Rolfs, C.; Kunz, R.; Hammer, J.W.; Mayer, A.; Paradellis, T.; Kossionides, S.; Chronidou, C.; Spyrou, K.; Degl'Innocenti, S.; Fiorentini, G.; Ricci, B.; Zavatarelli, S.; Providencia, C.; Wolters, H.; Soares, J.; Grama, C.; Rahighi, J.; Shotter, A.; Lamehi Rachti, M. (1999). "A compilation of charged-particle induced thermonuclear reaction rates". Nuclear Physics A. 656 (1): 3–183. Bibcode:1999NuPhA.656....3A. doi:10.1016/S0375-9474(99)00030-5.
- Müller-Krumbhaar, Heiner, ed. (2001). "Die himmlische Energiequelle: wie funktioniert die Sonne? Die Geschichte der chemischen Elemente von C. Rolfs". ... und Er würfelt doch!: Von der Erforschung des ganz Großen, des ganz Kleinen und der ganz vielen Dinge. Wiley/VCH. pp. 100–109. ISBN 978-3-527-40328-8. (The celestial source of energy: how does the sun work? The history of the chemical elements)
- Rolfs, C. (2001). "Nuclear reactions in stars". Progress in Particle and Nuclear Physics. 46 (1): 23–35. Bibcode:2001PrPNP..46...23R. doi:10.1016/S0146-6410(01)00104-1.
- Formicola, A.; Imbriani, G.; Junker, M.; Bemmerer, D.; Bonetti, R.; Broggini, C.; Casella, C.; Corvisiero, P.; Costantini, H.; Gervino, G.; Gustavino, C.; Lemut, A.; Prati, P.; Roca, V.; Rolfs, C.; Romano, M.; Schürmann, D.; Strieder, F.; Terrasi, F.; Trautvetter, H.-P.; Zavatarelli, S. (2003). "The LUNA II accelerator". Nuclear Instruments and Methods in Physics Research Section A: Accelerators, Spectrometers, Detectors and Associated Equipment. 507 (3): 609–616. doi:10.1016/S0168-9002(03)01435-9.
- Formicola, A.; et al. (2004). "Astrophysical S-factor of ^{14}N(p,γ)^{15}O". Physics Letters B. 591 (1–2): 61–68. Bibcode:2004PhLB..591...61F. doi:10.1016/j.physletb.2004.03.092. hdl:2078/31280. S2CID 118465819.
- Rolfs, C. (2007). "Nuclear reactions in stars far below the Coulomb barrier". Progress in Particle and Nuclear Physics. 59 (1): 43–50. Bibcode:2007PrPNP..59...43R. doi:10.1016/j.ppnp.2006.12.017.
- Costantini, H.; Formicola, A.; Imbriani, G.; Junker, M.; Rolfs, C.; Strieder, F. (2009). "LUNA: A laboratory for underground nuclear astrophysics". Reports on Progress in Physics. 72 (8) 086301. arXiv:0906.1097. Bibcode:2009RPPh...72h6301C. doi:10.1088/0034-4885/72/8/086301. S2CID 54619277.
- Rolfs, Claus (2010). "Vom Kolibri zum Wal". Physik in unserer Zeit. 41 (3): 152. Bibcode:2010PhuZ...41..152R. doi:10.1002/piuz.201090028. S2CID 120517683. (From the hummingbird to the whale; discussion of the physics of animals)

=== Books ===
- Rolfs, Claus E.; Rodney, William S. (1988). Cauldrons in the Cosmos: Nuclear Astrophysics. University of Chicago Press. ISBN 978-0-226-72457-7; foreword by William A. Fowler
- Auf ins Weltall – ein Wegbegleiter für Jung und Alt. Wagner Verlag, Gelnhausen 2009, ISBN 978-3-86683-506-1 (Out into space — an introductory guide for young and old)
- Wie Biosphäre und Medizin die Physik verwenden. Wagner Verlag, Gelnhausen 2009, ISBN 978-3-86683-496-5 (How biosphere and medicine use physics)
- Was man so über Energie wissen sollte. Wagner Verlag, Gelnhausen 2009, ISBN 978-3-86683-574-0 (What you should know about energy)
- Schall bei Mensch und Tier und die Kunst der Musik. Verlag Die Blaue Eule, Essen 2009, ISBN 978-3-89924-241-6 (Sound in humans and animals and the art of music)
- Spitaleri, Claudio; Rolfs, Claus; Pizzone, Rosario Gianluca, eds. (2010). Fifth European Summer School on Experimental Nuclear Astrophysics, Santa Tecla, Sicily, Italy, 20–27 September 2009. AIP conference proceedings; no. 1213. Melville, N.Y.: American Institute of Physics. ISBN 978-0-7354-0756-5; xvi, 259 p. : ill.; 24 cm.; "School was held ... at the Santa Tecla Palace Hotel, about 15 miles north of Catania"—Preface
