= Science slam =

Type of presentation event

A science slam is a scientific talk where scientists present their own scientific research work in a given time frame - usually 10 minutes - in front of a non-expert audience. The focus lies on teaching current science to a diverse audience in an entertaining way. The presentation is judged by the audience. A science slam is a form of science communication.

Research on science slams has highlighted their historical continuity with earlier forms of public science communication, arguing that despite their apparently innovative character, science slams draw on long-established strategies for legitimizing scientific knowledge to non-expert audiences. Studies have also noted persistent gender disparities in slam performances, with female scientists remaining underrepresented despite the format's informal character.

== Variants ==
Science slams are open to all fields of science. However, events specializing on particular topics exist as well. Examples include: technical science slams, health science slams, sociological science slams, junior science slams, kid's science slams, and binational science slams.
