= Goldenes Brett =

Society for Critical Thinking negative prize

The award Das Goldene Brett vorm Kopf (English translation: "The Golden Blockhead", literal translation "The Golden Board in Front of the Head") is a negative prize awarded by the Society for the Scientific Investigation of Pseudosciences (GWUP – Gesellschaft zur wissenschaftlichen Untersuchung von Parawissenschaften). The prize is organised by the Viennese regional group, the Society for Critical Thinking (GkD – Gesellschaft für kritisches Denken). The jury considers the "most astonishing pseudo-scientific nuisance" of the year in German-speaking countries. The award was presented for the first time in 2011 during the Sceptics Conference in Vienna. In 2016, the prize was presented simultaneously for the first time in Vienna and Hamburg (by the Hamburg sceptics of the GWUP).

== Process ==
Candidates are nominated via a form. A jury of experts selects the three top candidates among the nominees. The assessment is based on the following: degree of deviance, resistance to criticism, commercial interest, radius of action, pseudoscience, and hazard potential. In the course of a public award ceremony, three candidates are presented by a eulogist in an ironic speech. The three candidates can comment on their nomination. Thereafter the winner is announced, and they are given a golden statue with a board in front of the head and have the option of making an acceptance speech. In 2012, the jury of experts included Heinz Oberhummer (physicist), Werner Gruber (physicist), Johannes Grenzfurthner (artist) and the eulogists Mario Sixtus (journalist), El Awadalla (writer) and Niko Alm (entrepreneur and activist).

In 2012, an additional "lifetime achievement prize" was awarded for the first time. This prize recognizes a person who, according to the jury, "made a name with particularly impressive resistance to scientific facts over decades". The award was granted in 2012 by the Austrian Consumer Information Consortium (Verein für Konsumenteninformation) and since 2013 by the German Consumers' Union (Deutscher Konsumentenbund). The Austrian branch of the Cochrane Collaboration was a cooperation partner in 2015.

== Winners and nominees ==
Year	Lifetime award	Winners	Nominees/reason for nomination	Sideact
2011	not awarded	Peter-Arthur Straubinger (In the Beginning There Was Light)	Claudia von Werlhof (HAARP); Mario-Max Prinz zu Schaumburg-Lippe (elixir of wealth)	not held
2012	Erich von Däniken	Harald Walach of the Viadrina European University (spreading of esotericism and alternative medicine in academia)	Dieter Broers (doomsday prophecies); Austrian doctors association (promotion of therapies without proof of therapeutic effect)	Johannes Grenzfurthner
2013	Ruediger Dahlke	Homeopaths Without Borders (distribution of homeopathy in areas of medical crisis)	SPAR (revitalized water); Marcus Franz; Austrian politician and doctor (pseudoscientific claims regarding homosexuality)	Harald Havas
2014	Jochen Kopp/ Kopp Verlag	Singer Xavier Naidoo (public spreading of conspiracy theories)	Netzwerk Impfentscheid (claims regarding vaccines); Barbara Steffens; health minister of North Rhine-Westphalia (promotion of pseudoscience at public universities)	James Randi; Florian Scheuba
2015	Matthias Rath	Stefan Lanka (denial of the measles virus)	Jim Humble (Miracle Mineral Supplement); Susanne Winter; politician of the Austrian National council (spreading of conspiracy theories, climate change denial, antisemitism)	Bernhard Hoëcker; Ben Goldacre
2016	Ryke Geerd Hamer (Germanic new medicine)	Zentrum der Gesundheit	Roland Düringer (spreading of conspiracy theories in the public); Cancer centre Brüggen-Bracht (pseudoscientific claims on cancer therapy/ treatment of cancer patients with unapproved drugs)	Sideact in Vienna: Mark Benecke; Eckart von Hirschhausen awarded the lifetime award per video; Sideact in Hamburg: Armin Himmelrath; Marcus Rohwetter; Julia Offe
2017	Cornelia Bajic and the Deutschen Zentralverein homöopathischer Ärzte	Johannes Huber (physician), author of Es existiert: Die Wissenschaft entdeckt das Unsichtbare (2016) and Der holistische Mensch: Wir sind mehr als die Summe unserer Organe (2017)	Andrew Wakefield (Vaxxed); Peter Fitzek (Reichsbürgerbewegung)	Bernhard Hoecker
2018	Demeter International	The Hospital Nord in Vienna, together with the energetician Christoph Fasching, who drew an "energetic protective wall" around the hospital	Christina von Dreien (esoteric prodigy); Hans Tolzin (dairy expert and operator of websites against evidence-based medicine)	Sideact in Vienna: Sylvia Margret Steinitz; Christian Kreil; Lisz Hirn; Erich Eder; Sideact in Hamburg: Matthias Grübel; Nicola Kuhrt; Marcus Rohwetter
2019	Granderwasser	Hevert medicines (homeopathic manufacturers)	Dieter Köhler and the signatories of his opinion; International Foundation for Original Play	
2020	Ken Jebsen's Web-Projekt KenFM	Sucharit Bhakdi (spreading of COVID-19 misinformation)	Michael Ballweg; Attila Hildmann	
2023	Daniele Ganser	Ulrike Guérot (spreading of COVID-19 misinformation and false claims concerning the 2022 Russian invasion of Ukraine)	Stefan Homburg; Ferdinand Wegscheider	
2024	Ivo Sasek	Healy device	AUF1; Austrian Veterinary Chamber	Stefanie Allworth (Chemie on Tour); Stefanie Sargnagel
2025	Michael Frass	Hoss & Hopf	Christian Beer and the Verein Einheit.at; Mariana M., alias "Amela"	Bernhard Weingartner; Herr und Frau Österreicher acting ensemble
2026	To be announced	Not yet awarded; ceremony scheduled for 11 November 2026	Gerald Hauser (claims concerning climate change and COVID-19); Markus Streinz (life coach promoting esoteric and pseudoscientific methods); NEXIQA, an AI chatbot (pseudoscientific claims about health, viruses and DNA)	Ruth Grützbauch; Luksan Wunder

== Media recognition ==
Media recognition ranges from numerous mentions in the blogosphere, such as ScienceBlogs (Astrodicticum Simplex, Kritisch gedacht or Fischblog and Mathlog) to Austrian media such as Der Standard Die Presse, ORF, News, Heute and Vice.
