= ARENA der jungen Künste =

Theatre festival in Germany

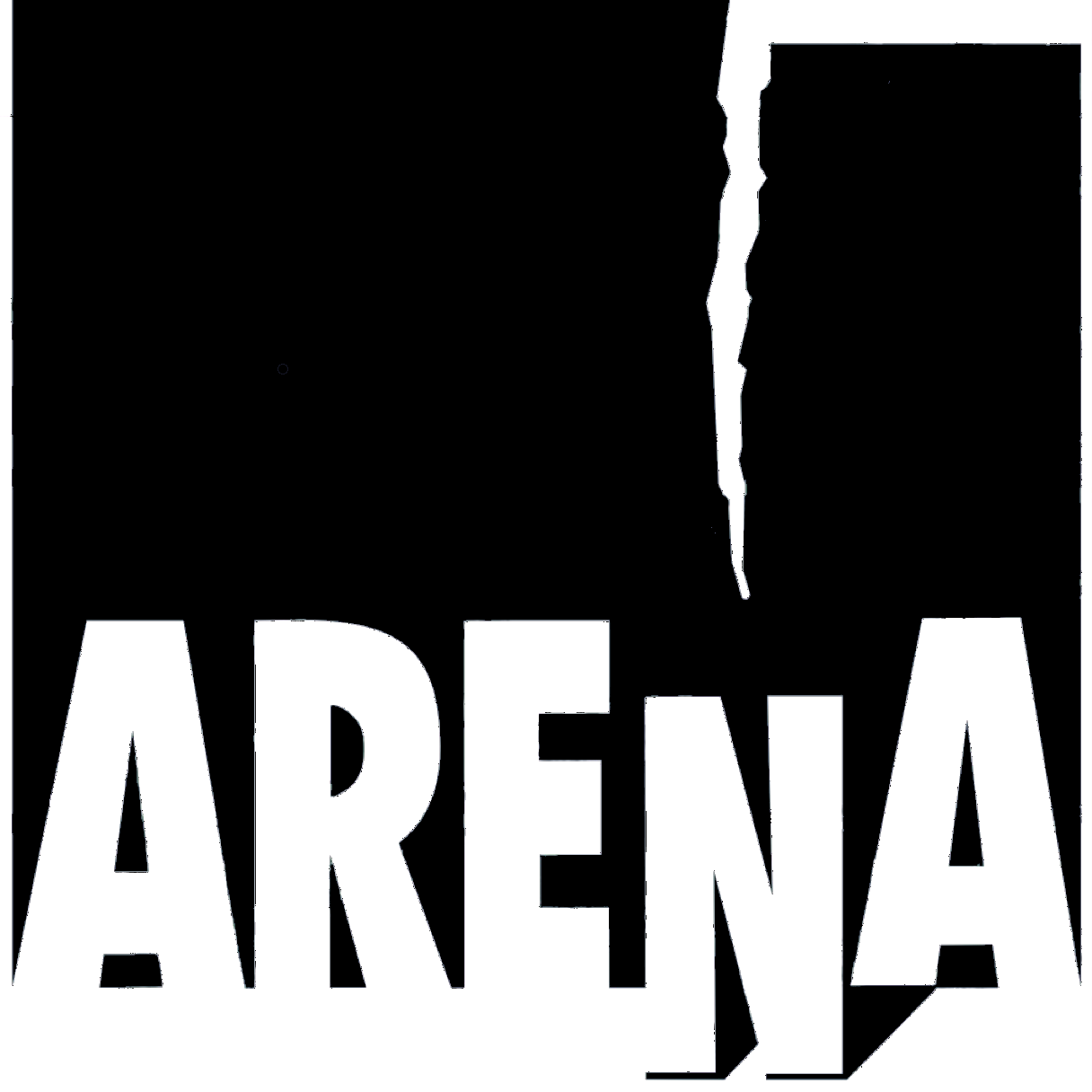
Logo

ARENA der jungen Künste is a theatre festival in Erlangen, Germany hosted by the association ARENA der jungen Künste e.V. since 1991.
