= Homeopathy Unrefuted? =

2022 documentary film by Erik Lemke

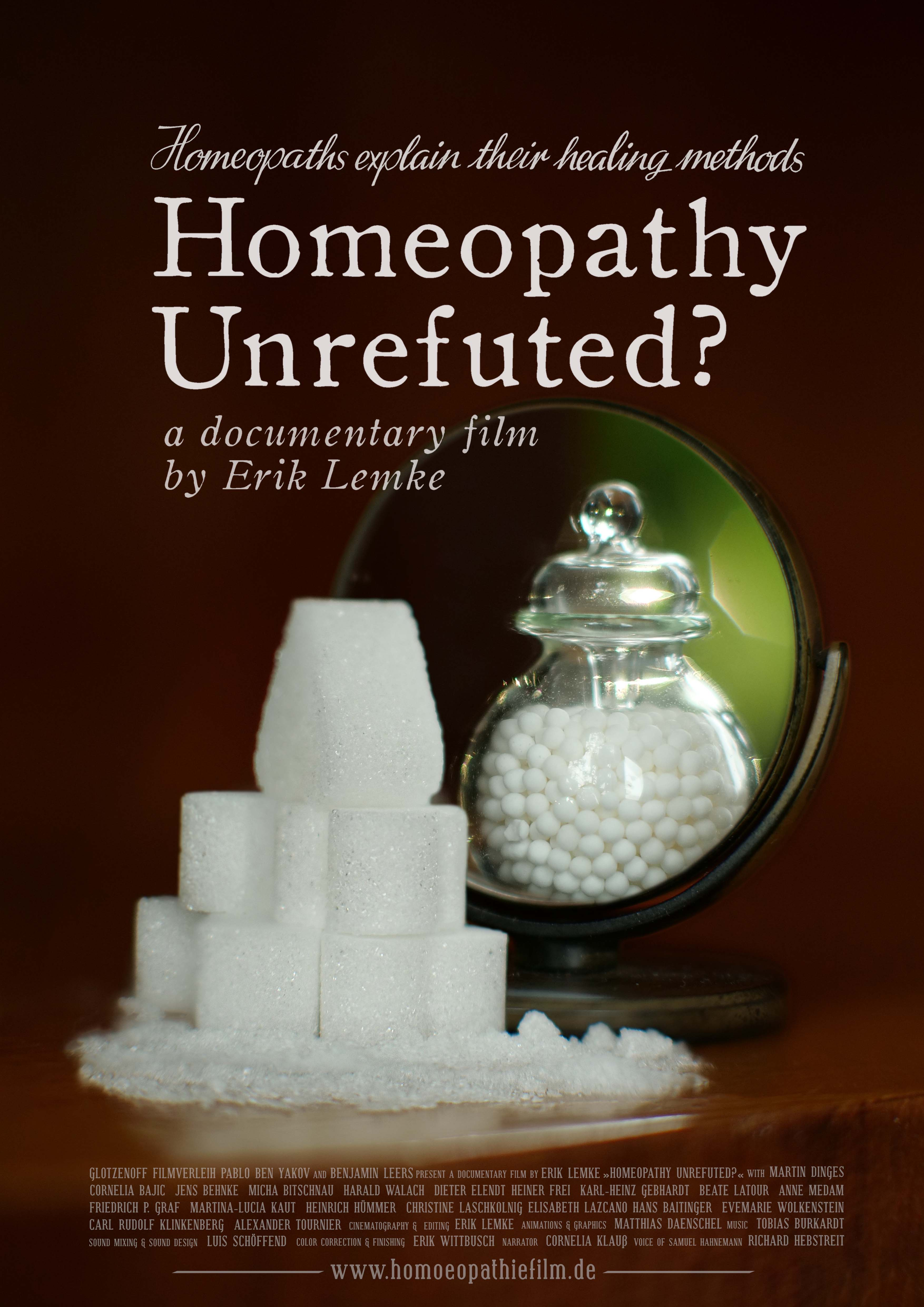
- Theatrical release poster
- Directed by: Erik Lemke
- Produced by: Erik Lemke
- Starring: Hans Baitinger; Cornelia Bajic; Jens Behnke; Micha Bitschnau; Martin Dinges; Dieter Elendt; Heiner Frei; Karl-Heinz Gebhardt; Friedrich P. Graf; Heinrich Hümmer; Martina-Lucia Kaut; Carl Rudolf Klinkenberg; Christine Laschkolnig; Beate Latour; Elisabeth Lazcano; Anne Medam; Alexander Tournier; Harald Walach; Evemarie Wolkenstein
- Narrated by: Cornelia Klauß; Richard Hebstreit (as Samuel Hahnemann)
- Cinematography: Erik Lemke
- Edited by: Erik Lemke
- Music by: Tobias Burkardt
- Distributed by: Glotzen Off Filmverleih
- Release date: January 26, 2022
- Running time: 86 minutes
- Country: Germany
- Languages: German; English

Homeopathy Unrefuted? (German: Homöopathie unwiderlegt?) is a 2022 documentary film by Erik Lemke in which homeopaths, guided by the Socratic method, discuss their therapy and reveal numerous internal contradictions. The film deliberately avoids outside commentary, letting the practitioners speak for themselves.

== Content ==
Nineteen proponents of homeopathy introduce the topic together. They explain that homeopathic remedies are often diluted beyond the point where any original substance remains—suggesting even a fridge or camera could become a homeopathic remedy. Views among the protagonists vary widely: Hans Baitinger calls medical studies a myth. Martina-Lucia Kaut claims that everything observed must be true. Others suggest that homeopathy's popularity may simply stem from belief in its effects. In 14 thematic chapters, the protagonists speak, often contradicting each other, with only occasional questions from the filmmaker.

=== Recovery After Visiting a Homeopath ===
While some, like Cornelia Bajic, attribute recovery to the remedy, others offer explanations for its failure: Beate Latour says it works even when it doesn't seem to; worsening symptoms may be a good sign. Heinrich Hümmer admits several failed attempts are common. Kaut blames untrained colleagues; Elendt lists "interferences" like toothpaste or coffee. Hümmer rejects Hahnemann's original cinchona bark experiment as it could never be reproduced; historian Martin Dinges calls Hahnemann's trials unscientific and his theories about high potencies incompatible with natural laws.

=== The Homeopathic Treasure Trove ===
Over 5,000 remedies exist. Plant-based ones lead to confusion with herbalism—something not all homeopaths mind. Others mention remedies derived from plutonium, dolphin milk, cancer tissue, electricity, or magnets. Heiner Frei uses "North Pole of a magnet" for children; Micha Bitschnau defends a remedy made from the Berlin Wall.

=== Preparation of Remedies ===
Harald Walach describes how ants or bees are ground with milk sugar to make the first potency (1C), with the mixture repeatedly diluted and succussed for higher potencies. Hümmer calls this ritualistic; Dinges admits it makes no scientific sense.

=== Differences Between Potencies ===
Some believe high potencies are more effective (Friedrich P. Graf); others alternate or always use 30C. Studies show no potency-related effects, say Jens Behnke and Alexander Tournier.

=== The Vital Force ===
Homeopathy is based on vitalism. Beate Latour stresses the "vital force", which Kaut dismisses as obsolete in today's world. Tournier sees these terms as useful metaphors for practitioners.

=== Miasms ===
After extensive anamnesis, homeopaths assign patients to a "miasm". Latour cites several; Kaut mentions four; Graf fewer; Elendt speaks of up to 100. Baitinger says using miasms strays from homeopathy's core. Anne Medam adds that medicine has abandoned the concept.

=== Constitutional Types ===
Many classify patients based on physical and emotional traits. Laschkolnig doesn't think of symptoms as decisive, focusing on personality and inheritance. Frei only treats symptoms, rejecting constitutional types.

=== The Kent Repertory ===
Homeopaths mostly use James T. Kent's repertory, which also forms the basis of computerized repertories, to find remedies, but Dr. Klinkenberg shows it's based on flawed translations, so most of the entries are essentially accidental. Despite these inaccuracies, no remedies or symptoms have ever been removed.

=== Legal Status ===
Under §38 of the German Medicines Act, homeopathics don't require proof of efficacy. Karl-Heinz Gebhardt credits lobbying and massive pressure on politicians, helped by Veronica and Karl Carstens. Homeopathy was also added to the medical curriculum after years of advocacy.

=== Variants of Homeopathy ===
Historian Dinges describes simplified variants like Schuessler salts. Others reference Michal Yakir's plant-human analogy or devices like electro-acupuncture, leading to false cancer diagnoses. Elendt concedes: all homeopaths could be wrong.

=== "Homeopathy Unrefuted" ===
The film's second half reflects on the internal contradictions. Behnke states that a theory must be falsifiable, otherwise it would amount to a religious dogma or something similar. Tournier adds: skeptics need not disprove homeopathy—it's the practitioner's job to prove it. Elendt shares this view. The film's title, "Homeopathy Unrefuted", may be nonsensical.

=== Reasons for Criticism ===
Baitinger and others suspect financial motives behind criticism. Elendt disagrees: claims need proof. Bajic urges critics to be more open-minded. When filmmaker Erik Lemke compares homeopathy to astrology or prayer, Elendt concedes the point. Walach says one solid proof of efficacy could resolve the debate—but it never came.

=== Studies ===
Behnke rejects claims of underfunding as homeopathic drug manufacturers are not willing to spend the same percentage of their profits for research as other drug manufacturers. The Carstens Foundation alone funded 30+ studies with over €30 million. If €500,000 is enough to replicate one, clear proof should exist within three years. But no matter the result, legal statutes prevent the Carstens Foundation shifting focus away from homeopathy. Walach suggests homeopathy may function as an elaborate placebo, which only works if all involved believe in it. Frei argues prescribing placebos is unethical. Walach concludes that admitting it's a placebo would end the practice.

=== What Patients Care About ===
Laschkolnig observes that children conditioned to homeopathy resist conventional medicine. Kaut advocates publishing only positive patient stories—because they resonate emotionally. Frei notes that if 80% of his pediatric cases can be treated with homeopathy, and if it's a placebo, then most pediatricians are overtreating and risking harm (assuming they would administer medication instead of just letting the body do its work).

== Production and Concept ==
Homeopathy Unrefuted? is Erik Lemke's second feature-length documentary film, following Berlin Excelsior. In an interview with Deutschlandfunk Kultur, he discussed the lack of a clear, universally practiced concept in homeopathy. According to Lemke, the topic was perfectly suited to the medium of non-confrontational Socratic dialogues, which he hopes will become more widespread in educational work in the future. He also deliberately avoided a balanced representation of proponents and opponents of homeopathy—he gave the latter no space at all—which, according to Wilfried Hippen of the taz, ultimately has an even more devastating effect on the proponents. As is often the case with pseudoscience, they appear on the surface to represent a coherent worldview, Lemke said to Anne Kohlick of RBB24.

Homeopathy Unrefuted? contains illustrations and animated sequences by Matthias Daenschel, with whom Erik Lemke previously collaborated on the Czech animated film Alois Nebel in 2011. Tobias Burkardt contributed the original music, as he did for Berlin Excelsior.

== Release ==
In addition to a festival release, primarily at festivals specializing in esotericism and fraud, such as the Hermetic Film Festival in Venice, or the Fraude Film Festival in Amsterdam for films about fraud, corruption, abuse of power and integrity, Glotzenoff Film Distribution released Homeopathy Unrefuted? in an accompanied cinema tour through German cities such as Berlin, Leipzig, Stuttgart, Münster, Braunschweig, Tübingen, Hamburg, Görlitz but also smaller towns such as Achern, Großhennersdorf, Gauting and some international screenings. The film was also shown and discussed at medical faculties such as that of LMU Munich and at homeopathic conferences.

There have been reports of clashes between critics and proponents, large groups of "Lemke fans", but also demonstrations where "no skeptics were to be seen anywhere." According to homeopath Thorsten Stegemann, participant of a screening of the film in Tübingen 2021, things became "unexpectedly emotional". Anne Medam, one of the protagonists invited to the discussion, even took the microphone from the director and refused to return it; the audience "booed him loudly." A presenter from the independent radio station Wüste Welle who rushed to the director's aid fled the auditorium in tears "because of this reference to 'violence.'"

Following the cinema tour, the film was released online on streaming platforms such as Sooner, Behind the Tree, Filmfriend and the educational film portal Eduflat, and is marketed as a DVD.

== Reception ==
The theatrical release of Homeopathy Unrefuted? resonated in press outlets and radio stations such as taz, Neues Deutschland, Kontext: Wochenzeitung, Radio Eins, RBB24, Deutschlandfunk Kultur, and others. However, homeopaths and skeptics reacted particularly vigorously, although both groups expressed mixed opinions.

Skeptic Norbert Aust of GWUP finds the topic covered "quite comprehensively", noting that "no aspect that plays a role in the discussion about homeopathy" is missing. However, he criticizes the director for leaving "the intellectual discussion of the content entirely to his audience," who have neither the time nor the "expertise and sensitivity of a homeopathy critic" for this. Aust does not expect "that there will be discussions with the audience after the screenings"—"especially not with supporters of homeopathy." Aust concludes by suggesting that one might even get the impression that this was a homeopathy commercial.

Maarten Koller of the Dutch popular science magazine Skepter also considers it "not inconceivable that the same people who believe in homeopathy, here too, see primarily the impressive titles and the serious assertiveness of the speakers and come to a different conclusion." He argues that the film offers "an interesting insight into the mindset of homeopaths" and speculates: "Had the therapists been interviewed in a group discussion rather than individually, it would likely have resulted in one big mess." However, Koller observes that "only occasionally does [the director] show how sharp-witted he could have been […] on the whole, he just lets the mush flow."

Werner Hoffmann of the Swiss Forum for Critical Thinking says the film "exudes a soothing calm. […] The author appears only marginally, more as a prompter, and never as a know-it-all. […] This presentation is exceptionally stimulating for one's own reflection." The Socratic method is all too rarely applied consistently, but Homeopathy Unrefuted? is "a prime example of how this method continues to exert a convincing effect even after 2,400 years."

Feedback from homeopaths often focuses less on analyzing the film itself and more on personal criticism of the director. Stefan Reis of the Association of Classical Homeopaths in Germany, for example, describes Lemke as a "journalist equipped with semi-informed and skeptical pseudo-knowledge of homeopathy," calls him "naive," and says he can be "pitied." He further characterizes the use of the Socratic method as "cultural appropriation." According to Reis, if Lemke believes "that he can cast doubt on the viewer's understanding of homeopathy as a whole through a clever combination of (sometimes only apparent) contradictions in homeopathic theory and methodology, then that is less Socratic than manipulative—which is pretty much the opposite of 'Socratic.'" Despite this criticism, Reis nevertheless recommends the film to his homeopathic colleagues in order to "reconsider their own positions on the issues raised, if necessary, and perhaps also to discuss them openly with colleagues."

Homeopathic physician Karin Schick writes in the Allgemeine Homöopathische Zeitung (AHZ) that Lemke's interviewees told her the director had promised to "provide a neutral, objective overview of the current state of research." She questions "the integrity of such a 'documentary filmmaker'" and declares his attempt to portray homeopathy as an antiquated healing method a "failure." According to Schick, it is "entirely possible to interpret the factual contradictions within homeopathic medicine presented as 'multifaceted.'" She also criticizes what she sees as a "preconceived, dismissive attitude," stating that Lemke "clearly reveals his rejection of any emotionalism as a rationalist." In a following issue Lemke was given the opportunity to respond in a one-page letter to the editor. Additionally, the editorial team published the following correction: "The producer of the film Homeopathy Unrefuted? criticized in the article, Erik Lemke, Berlin, is a filmmaker and not part of 'influential groups' that maliciously attempt to deprive human medicine of its humanity and empathy under the guise of pseudo-scientific arguments. The editorial team."
