= Walach =

Walach is a surname. Notable people with the surname include:

- Harald Walach (born 1957), German psychologist
- Magdalena Walach (born 1976), Polish actress
