= Grander =

Grander may refer to:

- John Grander, Austrian pseudoscientist and inventor
- Grander Musashi, Japanese manga series
- A. Grander VIII, a character from The Last American Vampire action horror novel
