= Oos, Baden-Württemberg =

Oos
- District
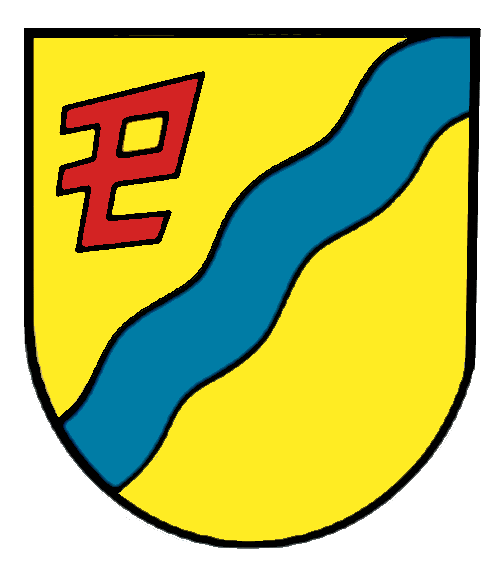
- Coat of arms

- Location within Baden-Württemberg Location within Germany
- Coordinates: 48°47′05″N 8°11′35″E
- Country: Germany
- State: Baden-Württemberg
- Admin. region: Karlsruhe
- City: Baden-Baden
- Incorporated: 1928

Area
  - Land: 12.97 km^{2} (5.01 sq mi)
- Elevation: 126 m (413 ft)

Population (2008)
  - Total: 7,207
  - Density: 555.7/km^{2} (1,439/sq mi)
- Postal code: 76532
- Dialling code: 07221

Oos has been a district of Baden-Baden (Germany) since 1928 and has a population of 7207. Its name is derived from the river Oos, which runs through Baden-Baden.

== History ==
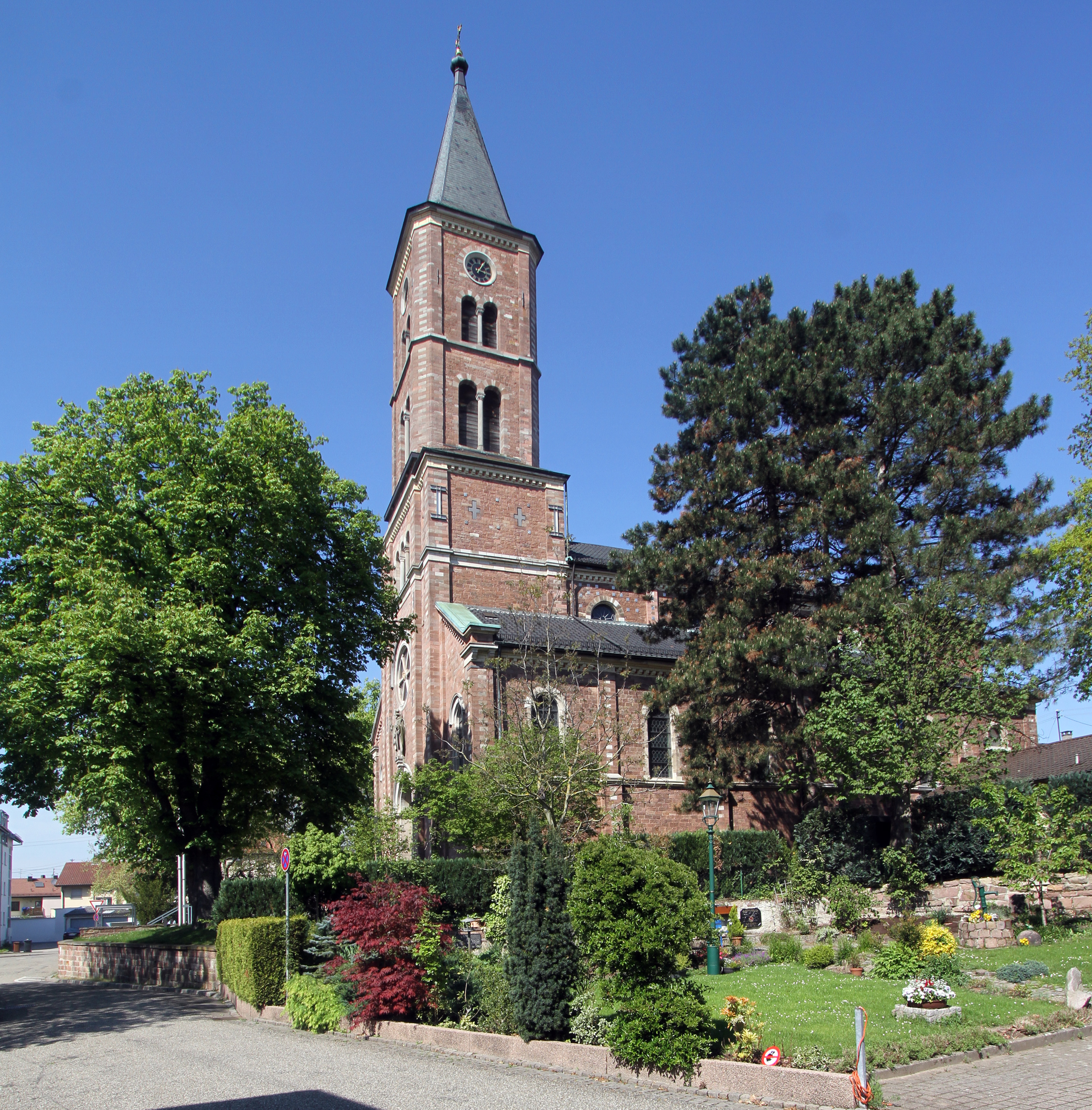
St. Dionysius Church, built in 1864 to replace its medieval predecessor

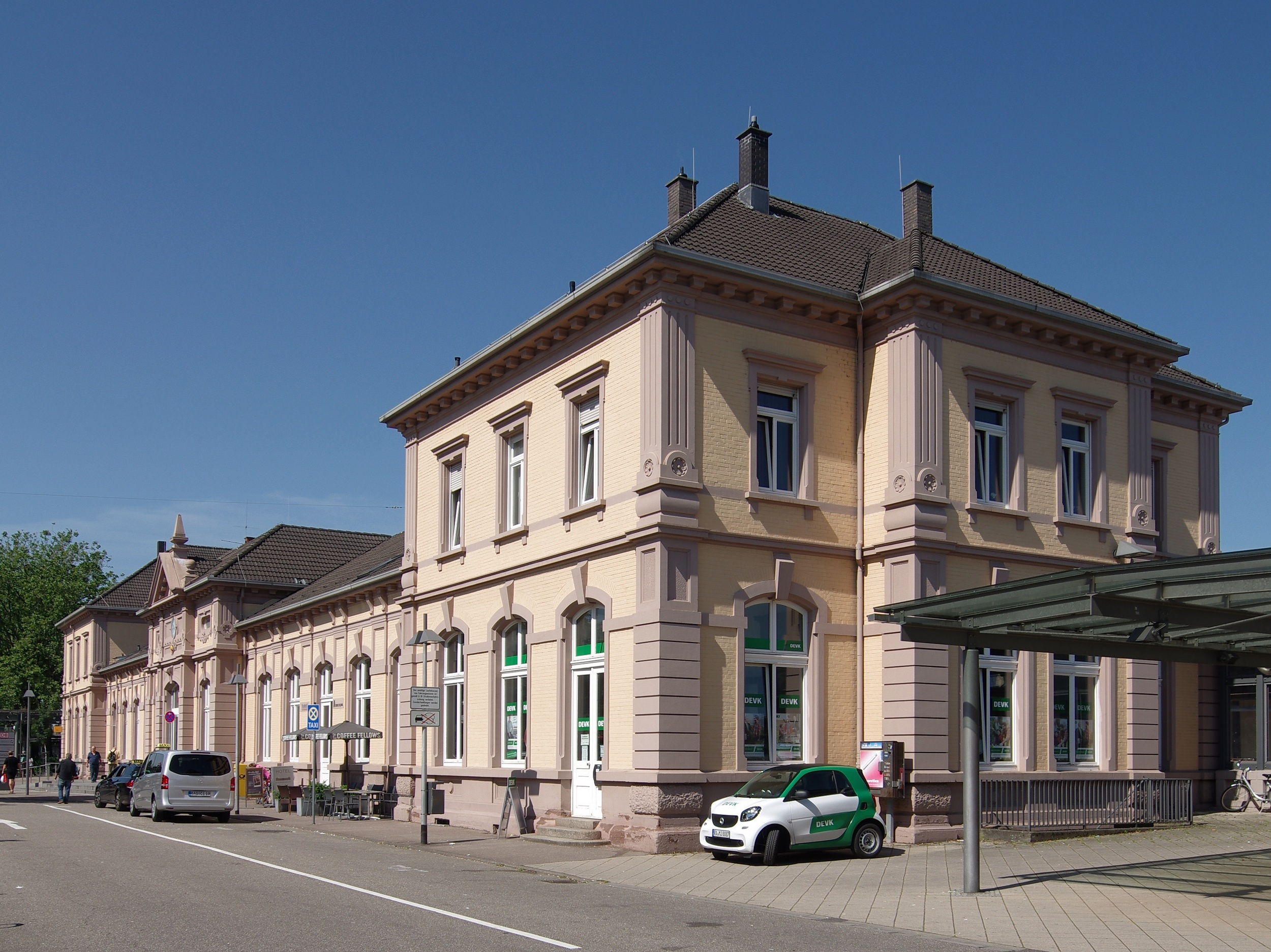
Baden-Baden Station

Zeppelin airship LZ 11 in the airship hangar in Oos

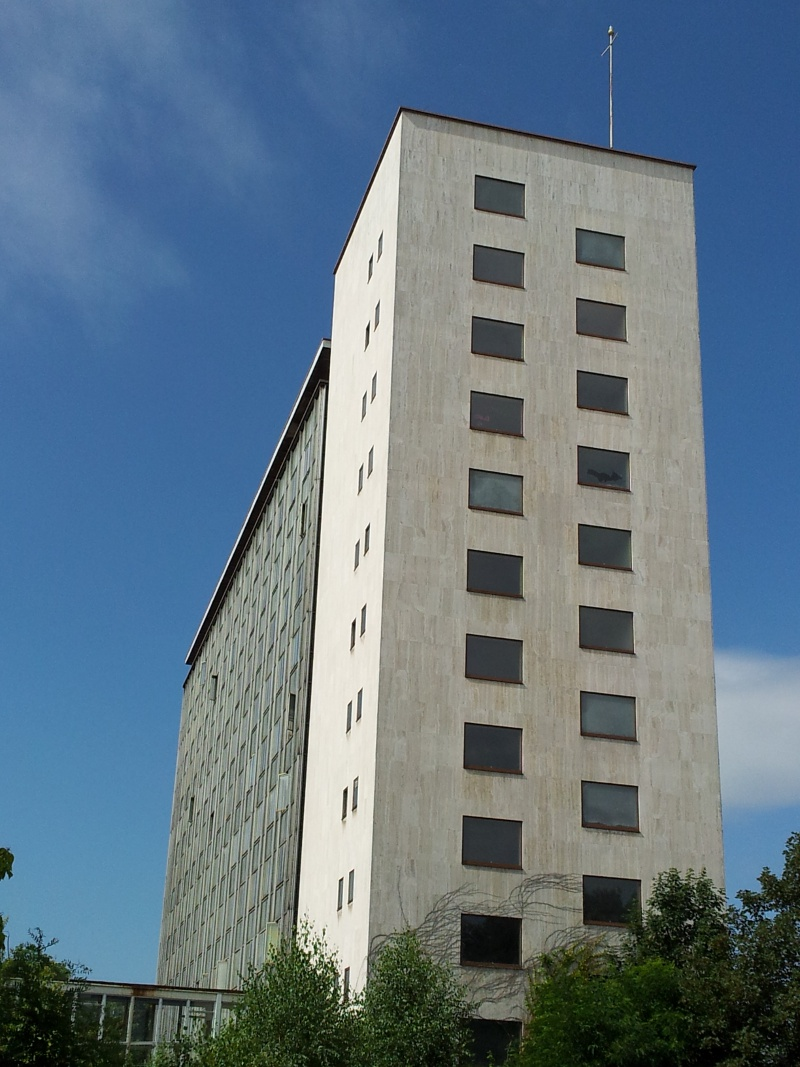
BABO, a former office building of the French occupying forces

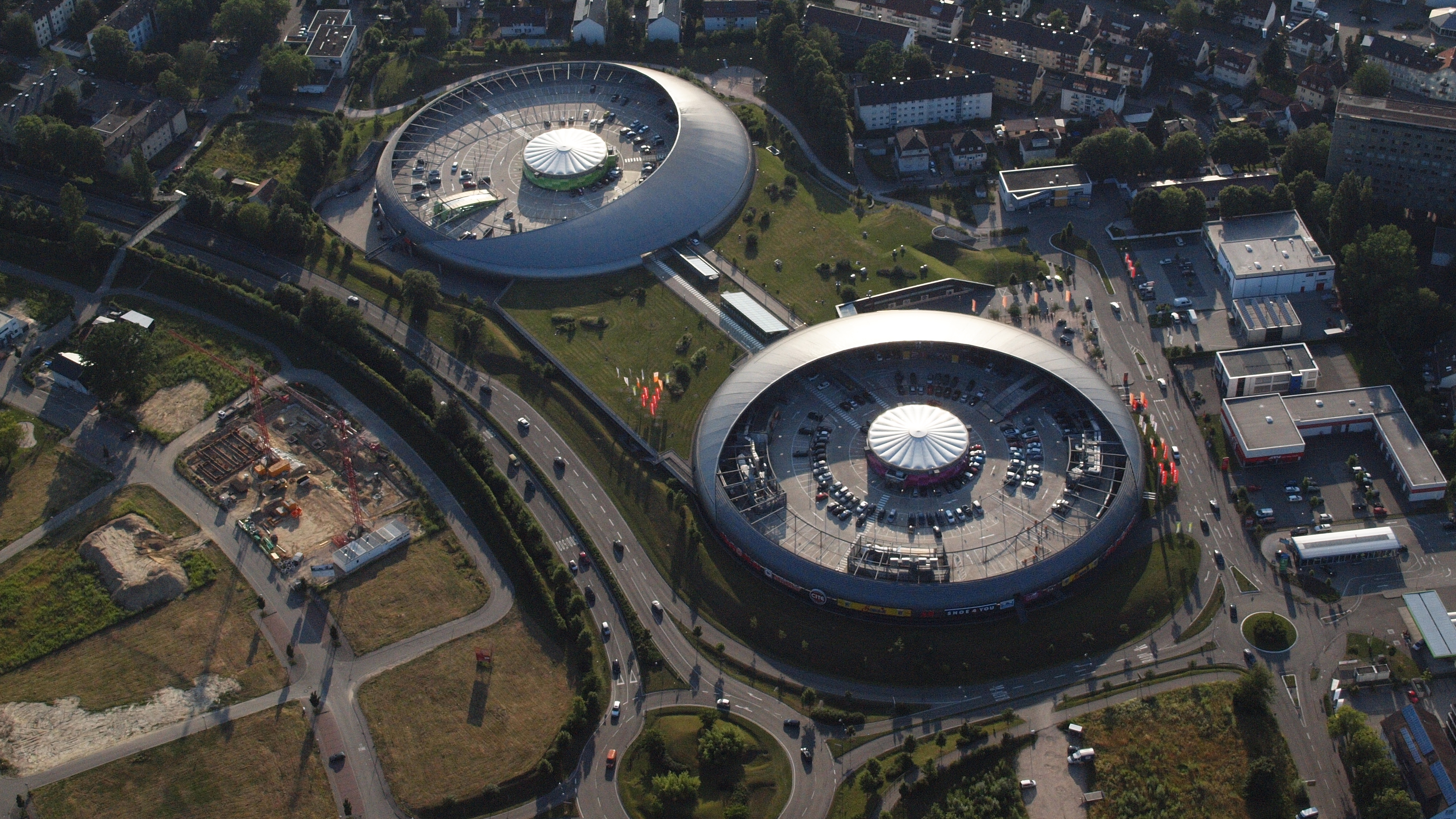
The shopping mall "Shopping Cité"

The village of Oos has always been important for the town of Baden-Baden, even before it was officially incorporated. Documents dating back to 1245, for instance, state that taxes collected from Oos were to be paid to the Lichtenthal Abbey, which was newly founded by Countess Irmengard of Baden.

The settlement itself is considerably older. This is evidenced, for instance, by a Roman votive stone dedicated to Diana, goddess of the hunt, which was found in Oos in 1794. The Romans under Emperor Trajan had realized the strategic value of the place, a plain at the edge of the Black Forest, and built the military road leading northward from Basel through Oos.

During the Middle Ages, the settlement was ruled at times by the Lichtenthal Abbey or the current Count of Baden. Its strategic value was proven once again in 1634, when the Catholic Margrave Wilhelm of Baden-Baden defeated his Protestant cousin and the Swedish occupying forces in battle on the "Ooser Blutfeld" ("blood plains of Oos"), thus ending foreign rule over his domain during the Thirty Years' War.

In the early 19th century, the village of Oos, which consisted of around 100 houses at the time, received its own official borders, followed by a train station in 1844. From this station, passengers were transported to Baden-Baden via horse-drawn omnibus, until a railway was built the following year. The route was used until 1977, when the Oos train station became the new Baden-Baden station.

In 1910, Oos was brought into the spotlight when Germany's first passenger airship hangar was opened on the new local airfield. The hangar and its assets were auctioned off for 295.000 Deutsche Mark following the Treaty of Versailles; some parts are still used in an industrial sawmill in Auggen today. On 30 December 1944 one third of the buildings of Oos (i.e. about 300 houses) was destroyed or heavily damaged by bombs and Saint Dionysius Church was severely damaged as well. On 2 January 1945 another air raid caused extensive damage to the railway station of Oos and to various barracks nearby.

Following World War II, the Baden-Oos airfield has become popular with gliders. After the opening of the Karlsruhe/Baden-Baden Airport in 1997, it was repurposed as an airport for the local aviation clubs. Large parts of the resulting free space were turned into commercial and industrial zones, increasing Oos' relevance as an industrial location.

Businesses located in Oos include Grenke AG, Eaton Germany GmbH, producer of alternative medicines Heel and cosmetics producer Sans Souci.

The "Europäische Medien- und Event-Akademie" (EurAka) is located in the Cité district, which was formerly inhabited by members of the French occupying forces and their families. In November 2006, the shopping mall "Shopping Cité" was opened along with a new local government building containing agencies for family, social work, youth and employment. In 2015, a Multiplex cinema was opened in the district.

Baden-Oos is home to the multiple German champion and cup winning chess club OSG Baden-Baden.

== In popular culture ==
Oos has a fictional resident in the form of Major Grubert, the main character in a series of comics by the French artist Jean Giraud, alias Moebius.
