= Ryszard Wojnakowski =

Polish translator o f German literature

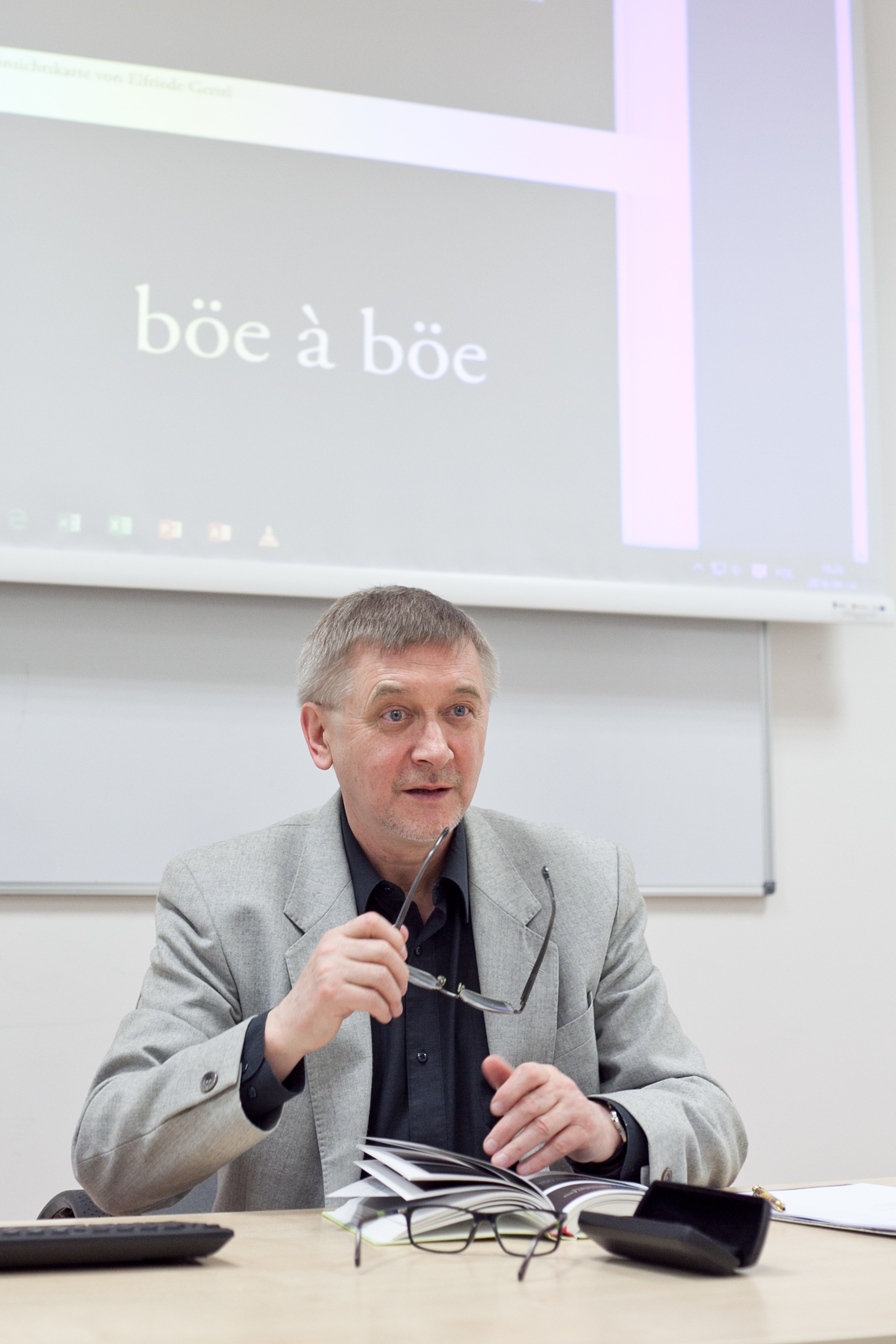
- Wojnakowski as guest at Institut for Germanistik at Jagiellonian University (2016)
- Born: 4 February 1956 (age 69); Busko-Zdrój, Poland
- Education: Jagiellonian University

Ryszard Wojnakowski (born 4 February 1956) is a Polish translator of German literature.

== Biography ==
Born in Busko-Zdrój, Ryszard Wojnakowski studied from 1974 to 1978 Germanistik and from 1977 to 1979 Scandinavian Studies at the Jagiellonian University of Kraków. From 1983 to 1993 he worked as an editor at Wydawnictwo Literackie. Since 1993 he has been translating literature – all in all about 100 books, plays and librettos. He is living in Kraków.

== Prizes and awards ==
- 1994 – Prize of the Bosch-Stiftung
- 1996 – Prize of Polish Translator Association
- 2005 – Translator in Residence of European Kollegium in Straelen
- 2007 – Prize of the Magazin „Literatura na Świecie”
- 2009 – Karl-Dedecius-Preis
- 2014 – Bronze medal „Zasłużony Kulturze Gloria Artis”

== Bibliography / selection ==
- Johann Wolfgang von Goethe, Wybór pism estetycznych, PWN, Warszawa 1981;
- Klaus Mann, Brzuchomówca, WL, Kraków 1986;
- Fritz Rudolf Fries, Nowe światy Aleksandra, Czytelnik, Warszawa 1988;
- Heinrich Böll, Kobiety na tle krajobrazu z rzeką, Wyd. Poznańskie, Poznań 1989;
- Hans Henny Jahnn, 13 niesamowitych opowieści, WL, Kraków 1990;
- Alfred Andersch, Ojciec mordercy, WL, Kraków 1990;
- Karl Leberecht Immermann, Münchhausen, Verum, Warszawa 1996;
- Klaus Mann, Ucieczka na północ, Przedświt, Warszawa 1992;
- Erich Maria Remarque, Nim nadejdzie lato, Czytelnik, Warszawa 1992;
- Otto Basil, Brunatna rapsodia, Alfa, Warszawa 1993;
- Karl May, W wąwozach Bałkanów, Rebis, Poznań 1993;
- Heinrich Böll, Portret grupowy z damą, Czytelnik, Warszawa 1993;
- Horst Stern, Król tyran, KAW Poznań 1993;
- Stefan Heym, Ahaswer, Oficyna Literacka, Kraków 1999;
- Manfred Lurker, Przesłanie symboli, Znak, Kraków 1994;
- Erich Maria Remarque, Wróg, Czytelnik, Warszawa 1995;
- Robert Musil, Zaczarowany dom, w: Sześć kobiet, Zysk, Poznań 1996;
- Ephraim Kishon, Z zapisków podatnika, Wydawnictwo „m”, Kraków 1994;
- Edgar Hilsenrath, Nazista i fryzjer, WL, Kraków 1994;
- Edgar Hilsenrath, Baśń o myśli ostatniej, Książnica, Katowice 2005;
- Erich Maria Remarque, Iskra życia, Czytelnik, Warszawa 1995;
- Hans Helmut Kirst, Wszystko ma swoją cenę, Interart, Warszawa 1996;
- Gershom Scholem, Kabała i jej symbolika, Znak, Kraków 1996;
- Tanja Kinkel, Liście w księżycowym blasku, Świat Książki, Warszawa 1997;
- Peter Pawlowsky, Chrześcijaństwo, Znak, Kraków 1997;
- Irene Salome Cyrus, Indianie Ameryki Północnej, Znak, Kraków 1997;
- Tanja Kinkel, Cienie La Rochelle, Świat Książki, Warszawa 1998;
- Walter Krämer, Götz Trenkler, Leksykon pomyłek, Świat Książki, Warszawa 1999;
- Martin Buber, Mojżesz, Cyklady, Warszawa 1998;
- Christine Busta, Mała apologia ludzi, Oficyna Literacka, Kraków 1998;
- Peter Henning, Śmierć motyla, Książnica, Katowice 1998;
- Siegfried Fischer-Fabian, Aleksander Macedoński, Świat Książki, Warszawa 2000;
- Hanns von Mühlenfels, Polska elegia, Baran i Suszczyński, Kraków 1999;
- Dorothee Schmitz-Köster, W imieniu rasy, Trio, Warszawa 2000;
- Hermann Kinder, Werner Hilgemann, Atlas historii świata t. 2, Prószyński, Warszawa 2000;
- Erich von Däniken, W imieniu Zeusa, Świat Książki, Warszawa 2000;
- Christine Lavant, Nocny krzyk pawia (2-jęz.), Oficyna Literacka, Kraków 2000;
- Franz Dornseiff, Alfabet w mistyce i magii, Cyklady, Warszawa 2001;
- Stefan Maiwald, Gerd Mischler, Seksualność w cieniu swastyki, Trio, Warszawa 2003;
- Christine Busta, Wśród powszechnego przemijania (2-jęz.), Antykwa, Kraków 2002;
- Michael Ende, Kuba Guzik i maszynista Łukasz, Siedmioróg, Wrocław 2001;
- Alois Woldan, Mit Austrii w literaturze polskiej (połowa), MCK, Kraków 2002;
- Guido Knopp, Kobiety Hitlera i Marlena, Świat Książki, Warszawa 2002;
- Michael Ende, Kuba Guzik i Dzika 13, Siedmioróg, Wrocław 2004;
- Ilse Aichinger, Podarowana rada (2-jęz.), Antykwa, Kraków 2002;
- Bernhard Schlink, Miłosne ucieczki, Wyd. Polsko-Niemieckie, Warszawa 2003;
- Erich Maria Remarque, Noc w Lizbonie (nowy przekład), Rebis, Poznań 2003;
- Christian Reuter, Zamachowcy-samobójcy, Świat Książki, Warszawa 2003;
- Friederike Mayröcker, Zielony montaż (2-jęz.), Antykwa, Kraków 2003;
- Charlotte Link, Dom sióstr, Świat Książki, Warszawa 2005;
- Erich Maria Remarque, Cienie w raju (nowy przekład), Rebis, Poznań 2004;
- Martin Buber, Opowieści o aniołach, duchach i demonach, Cyklady, Warszawa 2004;
- Peter Berling, Korona świata, Książnica, Katowice 2005;
- Michael Ende, Wunschpunsch, Nasza Księgarnia, Warszawa 2005;
- Ilona Hilliges, Biała czarownica, Świat Książki, Warszawa 2007;
- Robert Jazze Niederle, Mikstura..., czyli komiks i literatura, National Geographic, Warszawa 2008;
- Wolfgang Hilbig, Ja, Atut, Wrocław 2006;
- Lisa Mayer, Anioł o dwóch twarzach (2-jęz.), Antykwa, Kraków 2006;
- Cornelia Funke, Piracka świnka, Nasza Księgarnia, Warszawa 2006;
- Walter Moers, 13 ½ życia kapitana Niebieskiego Misia, Słowo/Obraz Terytoria, Gdańsk 2007;
- Erich Maria Remarque, Hymn na cześć koktajlu, Rebis, Poznań 2006;
- (zbior.) Ucieczka, wypędzenie, integracja, Dom Historii Niemiec, Bonn 2007;
- Peter Berling, Czarny kielich. Tajemnica templariuszy, Książnica, Katowice 2007;
- Cornelia Funke, Kudłaty Pazur i inni, Nasza Księgarnia, Warszawa 2007;
- Peter Berling, Czarny kielich. Pieczęć Salomona, Książnica, Katowice 2007;
- Wolfgang Hilbig, Prowizorium, Atut, Wrocław 2008;
- Rose Ausländer, Głośne milczenie (2-jęz.), Atut, Wrocław 2008;
- Ingo Schulze, Komórka, WAB, Warszawa 2009;
- Patrick Süskind, O miłości i śmierci, Świat Książki, Warszawa 2009;
- Erich Maria Remarque, Łuk Triumfalny (nowy przekład), Rebis, Poznań 2009;
- Reinhard Jirgl, Niedopełnieni, Borussia, Olsztyn 2009;
- Tanja Kinkel, Synowie wilczycy, Książnica, Katowice 2010;
- Michael Ende, Momo (nowy przekład), Znak, Kraków 2010; wznowienie 2018:
- Erich Maria Remarque, Na Zachodzie bez zmian (nowy przekład), Rebis, Poznań 2010;
- Rolf Bauerdick, Jak Matka Boska trafiła na Księżyc, WL, Kraków 2011;
- Armin Senser, Wielkie przebudzenie, Atut, Wrocław 2011;
- Martin Walser, Zakochany mężczyzna, Arkadia Literatur Verlag, Weilburg 2011;
- Heike Görtemaker, Ewa Braun. Na dworze Führera, WL, Kraków 2011;
- Alex Capus, Leon i Luiza, Świat Książki, Warszawa 2013;
- Erich Maria Remarque, Droga powrotna (nowy przekład), Rebis, Poznań 2012;
- Alexander Lernet-Holenia, Germania (2-jęz.), Atut, Wrocław 2012;
- Poszerzenie źrenic. Poezja Szwajcarii niemieckojęzycznej po 1945 (wybór i część przekładów), Atut, Wrocław 2013;
- Iren Baumann, Kiedy dojeżdżający są jeszcze w drodze do domu (2-jęz.), Słowo/ Obraz Terytoria, Gdańsk 2013;
- Alexander Lernet-Holenia, Hrabia Luna, Atut, Wrocław 2013;
- Klaus Merz, Jakub śpi. Właściwie powieść, Atut, Wrocław 2015;
- Joseph Roth, Pajęczyna, Austeria, Kraków 2017;
- Elfriede Gerstl, Używam więc jestem | Ich gebrauche also bin ich, Austeria, Kraków 2018;
- Michael Ende, Niekończąca się historia, Znak, Kraków 2018

=== Libretti and radio plays ===
- F. Zell (pseudonym), Richard Genée, Gasparone (Krakauer Operette)
- Gerhart Hauptmann, Czarna maska (Oper Krakau undi Polnisches Radio II)
- Eugen Ruge, Elegia babelsberska (Polnisches Radio II)
- Eugen Ruge, Resztka ciepła (Polnisches Radio II)
- Elias Canetti, Do chwili ostatniej (Polnisches Radio II)
- Kristof Magnusson, Azyl dla mężczyzn (Polnisches Radio I)
- Klaus Mann, Zakratowane okno (Polnisches Radio), 2000.
