= Homeopaths Without Borders =

American nonprofit organization

- Formation: 1996; 30 years ago
- Founder: Nancy Kelly
- Founded at: Hebron, New Hampshire
- Type: Nonprofit
- Website: www.hwbna.org

Homeopaths Without Borders (HWB) is a nonprofit organization based in Hebron, New Hampshire, which was founded in 1996 by Nancy Kelly. Modelled after Doctors Without Borders, it sends practitioners to developing countries to administer the pseudoscience of homeopathy, in an attempt to gain traction in countries where it does not already have a foothold. It has several different national associations, including Germany and North America.

HWB delivers homeopathic medicines which they claim help with treatment of malaria, typhoid and other potentially deadly diseases. Homeopathic medications have not been deemed effective in any of these conditions. They claim to have helped spread homeopathy to countries such as Bosnia-Herzegovina, Macedonia, and Kenya. They sent homeopaths to distribute water, food and homeopathic treatments to Haiti after the 2010 earthquake.

== Criticism ==
HWB has been largely criticized by the scientific community.

In 2013 HWB were awarded The Golden Blockhead award by the Society for the Scientific Investigation of Parasciences.
