= Bombing of Baden-Baden in World War II =

The German town of Baden-Baden in the Black Forest was the target of various Allied air raids in 1944 and 1945 and suffered some bomb damage. The historic town centre, the casino and the spa area, however, remained undamaged. Baden-Baden which had 33,166 inhabitants in May 1939 was regarded as a minor target. There were a goods station and various barracks several kilometres away from the town centre.

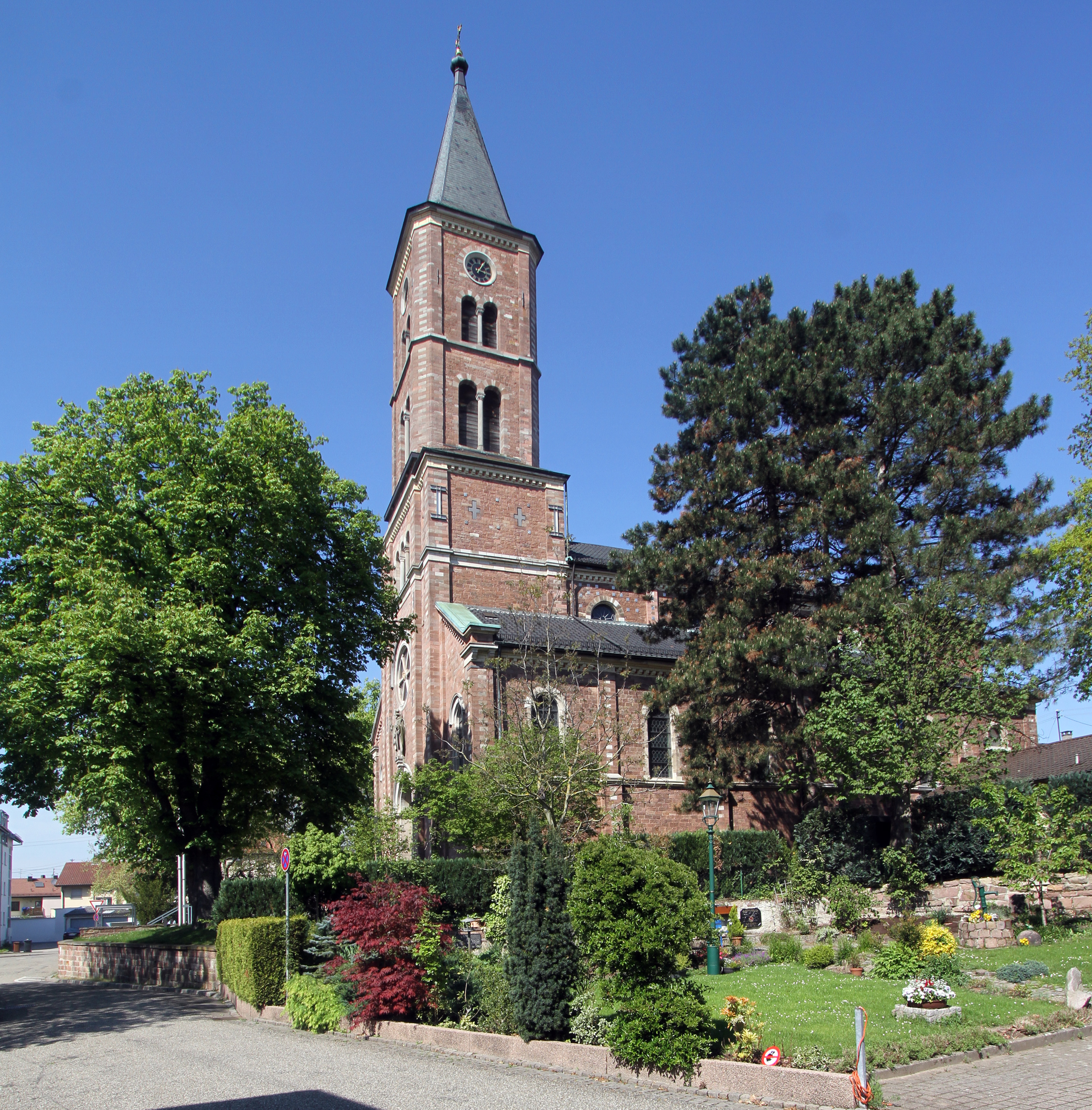
Saint Dionysius Church in Baden-Baden, destroyed by bombs in 1944 and rebuilt after World War II

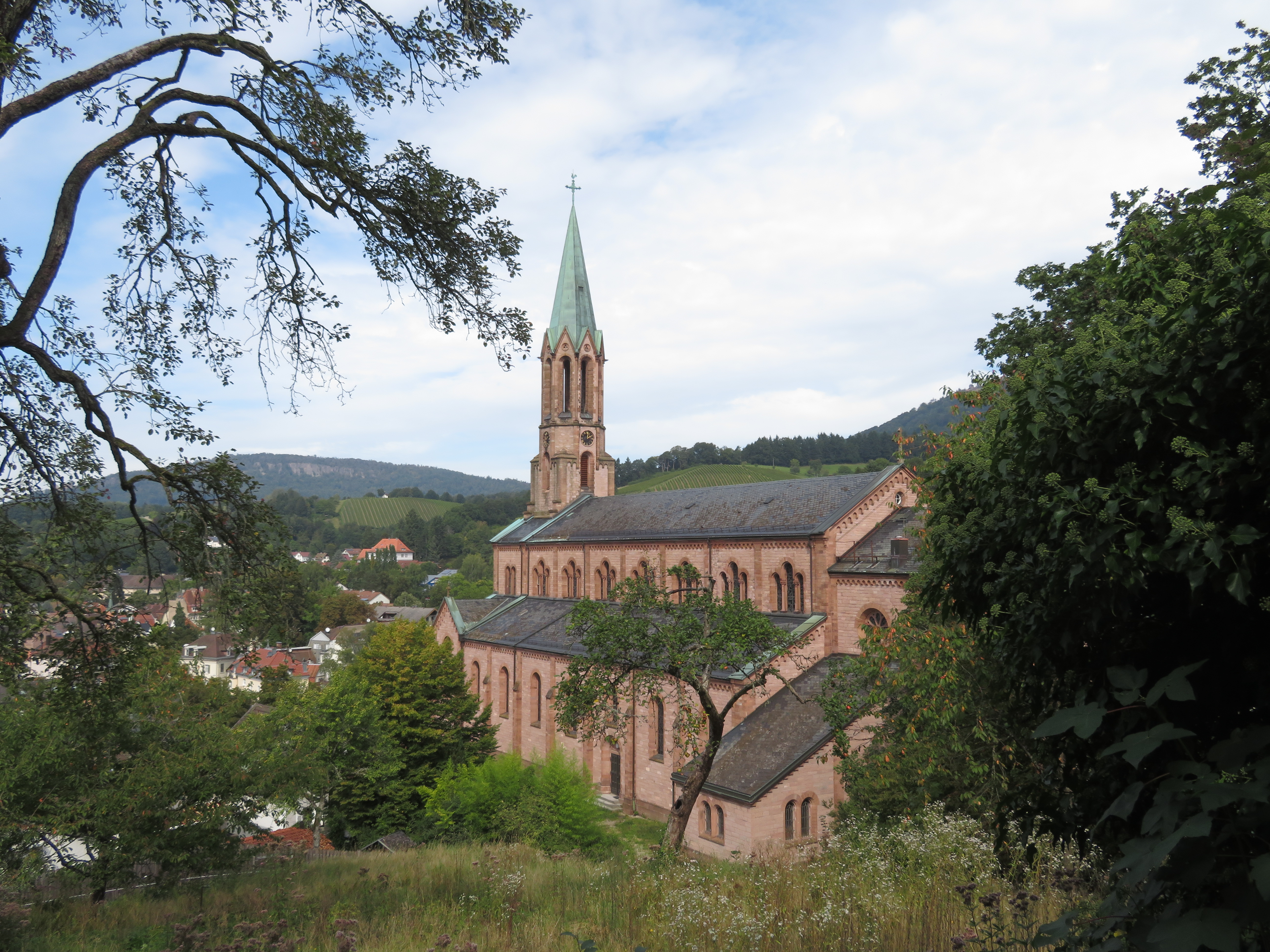
Saint Bonifatius Church in Baden-Baden, destroyed by bombs in 1943 and rebuilt after World War II

On 11 March 1943 Baden-Baden was probably an alternate target when Lichtental, a residential area in the southwest of the town, was hit by bombs. Saint Bonifatius Church was severely damaged by bombs and burnt down. The church was rebuilt after the war.

Balg, a residential area in the northeast of Baden-Baden, was hit by bombs on 17 December 1944. On 30 December 1944 one third of the buildings of Oos (i.e. about 300 houses), a residential area in the north of the town, was destroyed or heavily damaged by bombs and Saint Dionysius Church was severely damaged as well. On 2 January 1945 another air raid caused extensive damage to the railway station of Oos and to various barracks in the northern part of Baden-Baden.

During World War II 3.1% of the housing in Baden-Baden was completely destroyed by bombs and 125 civilians were killed. 11 industrial plants, 113 commercial enterprises and 19 public buildings including two churches were destroyed or seriously damaged, and 5.77% of the housing was heavily damaged by bombs.

After the war 79,000 cubic metres (2.8 million cubic feet) of rubble had to be removed from the streets.

== Bibliography ==
- Erich Keyser: Badisches Städtebuch. Stuttgart 1952, p.89.
