= Original Play =

Scientifically unrecognized game concept

Original Play is a scientifically unrecognized game concept that was invented by American geographer and author Oscar Frederick Donaldson in the 1970s.

== Organization ==
The sponsoring association, International Foundation for Original Play, was founded in 2018 by Jolanta Graczykowska, the "only authorized representative and coordinator of Original Play for Europe since 2002". The foundation is registered as non-profit in Poland, along with the association "Original Play Austria - play from the heart", which has existed in Austria since 2015. The association and foundation offer workshops, seminars, and lectures in several European countries to work with children and those interested.

=== Logo ===
The logo is composed of two prominent blue abstract figures and a more trivial figure, arranged around a small red heart and intertwined in a spiral heart shape. Some variants include a single blue figure with a heart carrying the respective national flag of the country.

== Concept ==
Adults act "playfully" with unrelated and unfamiliar adolescents and children, but also interact with other adults in close physical contact, often on the floor: rolling around, riding on each other, cuddling, or otherwise being physically active. According to Donaldson, the initiative should come from the child or the opposite of the Original Play game master. The game leader can actively ask children and young people to take part, and then let the children decide for themselves whether they want to do so.

Donaldson distinguishes "Original Play" as an original game in which adults adapt to children, from "cultural play," which is taught to children to adapt them to the culture of adults.

=== Objective ===
The concept is said to help children, adolescents, and adults (with and without disabilities) play instinctively, peacefully express joy and trust, and get to know their bodies better. Through Original Play, a psychological and physiological process should be set in motion that enables a combination of cognitive, emotional, and sensory-motor learning. In this way, the individual experiences belonging to the group without fear and competition.

=== Game participants ===
Donaldson says he has used the method with children and wild animals around the world. The homepage states: "His playmates are children with special needs, gang members, refugees and street children, prison inmates, cancer patients, dolphins, whales, lions, grizzly bears, wolves, baboons, and butterflies."

== Methodology ==
Original Play is played on laid-out mats. Toys are not used. There is only physical action. There are only two rules of the game:

- The participants are invited by the game leader and should decide for themselves each time they come on the mats and whether or how they get in contact.
- Clapping the game master twice means that the game unit, which often lasts only a few seconds or a few minutes, is over, and the participants go back to their seats.

According to the club, a game unit lasts between 30 and 60 minutes, depending on the age of the participants and group size. A 50 square meter room and ten meter square gymnastics mats are required for the play area.

== Criticism ==
The criticism of Original Play concerns:

- Donaldson's fragmentary and erroneous statements about expertise and awards, which he never publicly corrected.
- The lack of pedagogical evidence of the procedure, the basics, and successes of which are mainly based on the information provided by the inventor and the association.
- The specified lack of control of those interested, who are trained to be game leaders for a fee, without being checked, to then be fed to children and young people who are unknown to them, with whom they then act physically close.

=== Reactions from experts ===
- The psychologist Fabienne Becker-Stoll, head of the Staatsinstitut für Frühpädagogik, warns against Original Play. The method is scientifically and developmentally unsound and runs counter to children's basic needs; their introduction in some institutions is negligent and naive. Well-developed children do not seek physical contact with strangers, and it is clear that in this constellation, adults are dominant. Original Play is not only gross nonsense from a technical point of view and lacks any scientific basis, but also looks to them like an invitation for pedophiles.
- The educational scientist Wilfried Datler describes it as problematic. It is conveyed that it is desirable to come into such intimate contact with initial strangers quickly. Physical play is essential, but with people, you trust, like parents.

- The psychologist Michaela Huber considers Donaldson's book and method extremely unscientific. One scene described in the book reminds her of child pornography. What is being propagated is close to pedophilia and promotes that children should have no limits.
- According to the child psychiatrist Karl Heinz Brisch, Original Play will, in the worst case, give pedophiles access to daycare centers. In various media, Original Play is seen as an "invitation" to sexual abuse of children and is associated with pedophilia.
- The Austrian pedagogue and psychologist Josef Christian Aigner does not want to defend the method or group but considers the association's serious prejudice to be excessive. Above all, he criticizes the discussion that men in educational professions with children and educationally intended physical contact is generally suspected and prejudiced.
- Susanne Viernickel, who teaches early childhood education at the Universität Leipzig, rejects physical contact between children and strangers who are not caregivers like parents and educators. She said: "This method suggests to children: It is okay if strangers seek physical contact with them."

== Consequences ==
=== Prohibitions of Original Play ===
- In Austria, on the instructions of the Provincial Councilor Christiane Teschl-Hofmeister, a provisional ban on offering Original Play in educational institutions was issued; the city of Vienna also recommends schools and kindergartens not to work with Original Play until further notice. The association Österreichische Kinderfreunde also discontinued its cooperation with Original Play for the time being. In doing so, they comply with a request made by child psychiatrist Karl Heinz Brisch to be banned.
- In October 2019, the state of Brandenburg banned the implementation of Original Play in daycares in the state. Berlin had also previously decided on such a ban. In Rhineland-Palatinate, the execution of Original Play at day-care centers in the state was banned in October 2019.
- At the end of October 2019, the Evangelical Church in Germany refused to practice Original Play at the church's own day-care centers.
- In mid-November 2019, Bavaria and Bremen also banned the implementation of Original Play in kindergartens and daycare centers.
- In an article on Spiegel Online in November 2019, additional considerations and arguments for and against were given. The social authority in Hamburg expressly advised against the use of Original Play, and the Kinderschutzbund advocates a nationwide ban on Original Play in Germany.
- Steve Heitzer had to cancel an Original Play seminar in October 2019 after protests, which he wanted to hold in November 2019 as a cooperation partner of the organizer COMBAT in Regensburg, Bavaria.

=== Criticism of the ban on Original Play ===
- Business journalist András Szigetvari said in a comment on November 7, 2019, in the Austrian daily newspaper Der Standard that he considered the nationwide ban imposed by Education Minister Iris Rauskala on "federal schools to continue to work with this association" to be "plausibly justifiable", "After all, so far neither the association nor any well-known developmental psychologist has conclusively and on the basis of scientific work explained what unique educational added value Original Play has." He criticized, however, that "the impression is created" that "Original Play attracts all pedophiles who are made easy to abuse children", which "no innocent person has to put up with", and called this an "excessive debate".
- The title of a comment by Heike Klovert in the education section of Spiegel Online is: Why it is wrong to ban original play. Klover explained: "Children should feel safe. And at the same time, they should learn that they can decide whether they want physical contact. The trainers who use Original Play want to convey that to them."

=== The reaction of the organization ===
In a press conference initiated by the association, some Austrian media houses were invited to exchange ideas on November 13, 2019.

== Awards ==
- 2019: Goldenes Brett vorm Kopf (nomination)

== Literature ==
- Fred Donaldson: Playing by heart, Health Communications, 1993, ISBN 978-1-558742-53-6
- Fred Donaldson: Playing For Real: Re-Playing The Game of Life, Eigenverlag, 2017, ISBN 978-0-692885-86-4
