= Natalie Grams =

German physician and author (born 1978)

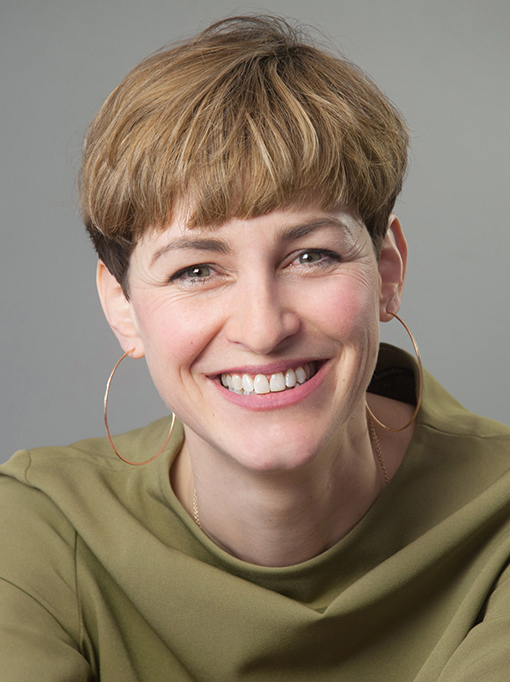
- Grams in 2018
- Born: 12 April 1978 (age 48); Munich, West Germany
- Occupations: Physician; Science communicator; Author; Skeptic
- Years active: 2004–present
- Known for: Criticism of homeopathy; Advocacy of Better Medicine; Natalie Grams' voice Recorded May 2018

Natalie Grams (born 12 April 1978) is a German physician and author. Formerly a practicing homeopath, she became known throughout Germany as a whistleblower for her 2015 debut book Homeopathy Reconsidered – What Really Helps Patients in which she criticized homeopathy. From 2016 to 2023 she had been a member of the Science Council of the Society for the Scientific Investigation of Parasciences (GWUP – the German Sceptics Association). From January 2017 to April 2020 she served as Communications Manager for the GWUP.

She also serves on the advisory board of the humanist Giordano Bruno Foundation since May 2017, and as vice president of the Humanist Press Foundation in Germany from October 2017 to November 2023. In October 2017 her second book, Gesundheit – A Book Not Without Side Effects, was published. It was followed by her third book, What really Works – Compass through the World of Gentle Medicine, in February 2020. In 2021, Natalie Grams was awarded the Fellowship of the Committee for Skeptical Inquiry. This award is given for "distingued contributions to science and skepticism and for commitment to rational inquiry and public education".

== Biography ==
Grams grew up in Bavaria, where she graduated high school in 1997. She studied medicine at LMU Munich, Technical University of Munich, and Heidelberg University, where in 2005 she gained licensure as a physician in Germany. In 2007 she received her doctorate as a medical faculty member at the University of Zurich. Until 2009, she was an intern at a private religiously-affiliated hospital in Heidelberg, where she specialized in geriatric and palliative medicine.

In a 2021 article, Sami Emory relates the story of an incident in 2013. Grams became violently ill from a viral infection. Normally Grams would have treated her condition with homeopathy. But her condition was bad enough that her family called for help. During the ambulance ride the medics engaged her in conversation and Grams said she was a physician. They asked what field of medicine she was in. She realized that the medics were able to save people's lives but, as a homeopathic doctor she was not. This caused her to question calling herself a homeopath, so she lied and said she was a general practitioner. She continued to practice homeopathy but it was only a couple of years later, when she started working on a defense of homeopathy, that questions about homeopathy would cause her to reevaluate homeopathy and her life in it.

In 2004, in parallel with her medical education, Grams began pursuing education in traditional Chinese medicine and homeopathy. She completed her homeopathic education with an additional professional designation in that area, and was active exclusively in private homeopathic practice from 2009 through 2015.

In May 2015 her first book Homeopathy Reconsidered – What Really Helps Patients was published by Springer Verlag in German (German title Homöopathie neu gedacht – Was Patienten wirklich hilft). She abandoned her homeopathic activity the same year. Grams is currently active in the Public Health sector, as a science communicator and as a freelance author.

== Criticism of homeopathy and alternative medicine ==
Grams is an authority, and a leading participant in public debate on the subject of homeopathy. As a practicing homeopathic doctor she was interviewed by journalists Christian Weymayr and Nicole Heißmann for their book The Homeopathy Lie (German title: Die Homöopathie-Lüge). Upon reading that book's criticism of homeopathy, Grams wanted to write a rebuttal in defense of homeopathy.

Instead, her research in preparation for this rebuttal caused her to reconsider the scientific evidence on the subject of homeopathy. This in turn led Grams to revise her own views on the topic. Rather than the planned defense of homeopathy, her first book Homeopathy Reconsidered – What Really Helps Patients, published in 2015, is a critical examination of homeopathy The book is especially critical of claims that homeopathy constitutes a specific drug therapy. Grams says she tried to be empathetic in her writing style, intending for the reader to "feel [her] agony, discovering these facts about homeopathy." As a practicing homeopath, Grams had experienced individual successes in treating patients, but her search for scientific arguments to justify these successes led her to realize that little evidence existed. She described the beginning of her doubts about homeopathy as coming "…when [she] learned that, in evaluating the efficacy of a therapy, the decisive thing is not one's experience but rather the results of clinical studies." She has said that letting go of her perception of homeopathy as "some sort of 'parallel knowledge' … just as admissible and legitimate as scientific knowledge" required a realization that she had deeply deceived herself.

At the end of this learning process, Grams decided to abandon her own private homeopathic practice, and livelihood, because she no longer wanted to offer therapies that she could not fully stand behind. In explaining this decision, she draws a contrast between the lack of scientific support for homeopathy and the positive secondary effects of the homeopathic setting, including the approachable and attentive style of patient care sometimes termed talking medicine. Grams describes Samuel Hahnemann, the German originator of homeopathy, as a clever person who rebelled against a superstitious, prescientific medical establishment which promoted therapies that imperiled the lives of patients; as she put it, "[h]omeopathy was, at the time, the lesser evil." She says that Hahnemann's own theories amounted to self-deception, with efficacy no greater than a placebo, "[w]hich is not surprising, since [homeopathic] medicines contain nothing." Grams credits a book by Daniel Kahneman with helping her understand that homeopathy had appealed to her fast, intuitive thought processes, bypassing her slow, analytical faculties, and that she had "avoided cognitive dissonance by rationally questioning homeopathy at a very late stage."

Although Grams fundamentally opposes homeopathy as a discipline, she wishes to see mainstream health systems embrace the idea of better medicine – an effort to enable intensive attention to the patient in daily medical practice. In interviews with German daily newspapers Süddeutsche Zeitung and Die Welt, Grams stated that "[h]omeopathy works because we homeopaths and our patients have the idea that it works", and characterized homeopathy itself as a patient which "lacks data and facts, it hallucinates, it does not want to admit its illness. But insight into illness can be a first step to recovery." She perceives a distorted picture among homeopaths of scientific work, in which science is thought to be not a method but a worldview; this misunderstanding leads to a lack of clarity about the ardour and rigor science requires to produce a result. She nonetheless considers the practical element of homeopathy – attentiveness to the patient – valuable, opining that physicians "must carry this over into everyday medical and clinical life – but without the magic part involving succussion and potentization." In an interview with Der Spiegel, Grams said that given the lack of evidence for homeopathic medicines' efficacy exceeding the placebo effect, "[i]f a group of doctors staunchly asserts that homeopathy works, one must – for the sake of patients – object."

The impact of Grams' position in print media, radio, and television was an essential factor in the intensified German public discourse surrounding homeopathy since 2015. She delivered a talk at SkepKon 2017 titled Enlightenment about pseudomedicine: What have skeptics achieved?

Along with author and homeopathy critic Norbert Aust, Grams co-founded the Information Network on Homeopathy (Informationsnetzwerk Homöopathie – INH) in 2016. She served as head and spokesperson for the INH from 2016 to 2020 and was followed by oncologist Prof. Dr. Jutta Hübner, Jena University.

She lent her expertise as a member of the "Münsteraner Kreis", a free association of scientists on the subject of "Pseudomedicine in Public Health", as an author in support of the Münster Memorandum on Practitioners of Alternative Medicine, which aims to mitigate the potential for patient harm from therapists who lack academic medical education (Heilpraktiker – literally healing practitioners) by proposing a German regulatory framework to balance the concerns of patient autonomy and freedom of therapy against fairness to health insurance providers and insurees. She also co-authored the second publication of the Münsteraner Kreis, the "Münster Memorandum on Homeopathy", which appeared in 2018.

== Reaction ==
Grams took up the publication of her 2015 book with the intention of stimulating self-reflection among those in the homeopathic orbit. She has expressed regret that this introspection had not yet happened until today. Homeopaths who reviewed her first book didn't go to a factual discourse but have questioned the motivation behind her conversion (i.e., her change of mind based on rational arguments), mostly in a defamatory way. Grams reported that she had received a lot of rejection since becoming a public critic of homeopathy, often in the form of personal attacks, defamations, even death threats. She had even had to take advantage of police protection at events.

Temporarily she held in mind writing a book collecting and discussing the many angry and partly threatening e-mails and comments she has received in response to her writing and activism. She hopes to reach people who share the false popular perception of homeopathic therapy as "gentle", "empathetic" and basically the "better medicine" and prompt them to re-examine that opinion on a factual basis.

== Writings ==
- Homöopathie neu gedacht – Was Patienten wirklich hilft (Homeopathy Reconsidered – What Really Helps Patients). Springer-Verlag, Berlin/ Heidelberg 2015, ISBN 978-3662453360. Published in English in 2019 under the title Homeopathy reconsidered – What Patients really helps. Springer Nature Switzerland, 2019, ISBN 978-3030005085
- Gesundheit – Ein Buch nicht ohne Nebenwirkungen (Gesundheit – A Book Not Without Side Effects). Springer-Verlag, Berlin/ Heidelberg, 2017, ISBN 978-3662547984.
- "Homeopathy – Where is the science? – A current inventory of a pre-scientific artifact". Grams N. (2019); EMBO Reports, e47761. doi:10.15252/embr.201947761
- Was wirklich wirkt – Kompass durch die Welt der sanften Medizin (What Really Works – Compass through the World of Gentle Medicine), Aufbau-Verlag, 3rd Edition, Berlin, 2022. ISBN 978-3-7466-3934-5

== See also ==
- Edzard Ernst: German-born former homeopath turned critic of homeopathy and alternative medicine generally
- Britt Marie Hermes: American ex-naturopath turned whistleblower; As of January 2018, remediating her academic medical education in Germany
