= Irmgard Oepen =

German physician and journalist (1929–20180

Irmgard Oepen (February 25, 1929 – July 9, 2018) was a German physician and medical journalist. She was known for her steadfast criticism of alternative medicine, especially of homeopathy.

== Education and career ==
Irmgard Oepen studied medicine at the University of Freiburg and LMU Munich, earning her doctorate at LMU in 1958. In 1973 she got her habilitation at the Philipps University of Marburg with a study of blood group serology.

Oepen worked from 1965 to 1994 at the Institute for Legal Medicine of Philipps-University Marburg. She was known for her commitment to scientific medicine. She published numerous articles critical of homeopathy and other alternative medical practices such as astrological health counseling.

Her work has been mentioned in Die Zeit. She published several works with Forensic serologist Otto Prokop.

Oepen was one of the founding members of the Gesellschaft zur wissenschaftlichen Untersuchung von Parawissenschaften (GWUP), a German group that investigates dubious scientific claims, especially in the fields of health and medicine. From 1987 to 1994 she was President of GWUP. In the years 1987 to 1996 she led the editorial board of the GWUP published magazine Skeptiker. She was also a member of the transnational American organization The Committee for Skeptical Inquiry.

== Works ==
- Leitfaden der gerichtlich-medizinischen Blutspuren-Untersuchung, mit Franz Schleyer, Schmidt-Römhild Verlag, 1977
- An den Grenzen der Schulmedizin, Deutscher Ärzteverlag, 1985
- Außenseitermethoden in der Medizin, mit O. Prokop (Herausgeber), Wissenschaftliche Buchgesellschaft, Darmstadt 1987, ISBN 3534017366
- Unkonventionelle medizinische Verfahren, S. Fischer Verlag, 1993, ISBN 3437007254
- Lexikon der Parawissenschaften, GWUP, Lit, Münster 1999
- Irmgard Oepen, Horst Löb: Der Orgon-Strahler – eine funktionslose, aber offenbar gewinnbringende Attrappe. Skeptiker 11 (4/1998) 148–152
- Irmgard Oepen: Unkonventionelle medizinische Verfahren. Stuttgart 1993
- Irmgard Oepen, Amardeo Sarma (Hrsg.): Paramedizin - Analysen und Kommentare. Münster 1998
- Irmgard Oepen, Rolf Scheidt: Wunderheiler heute. Eine kritische Literaturstudie. München, Zuckschwerdt 1989

== Sources ==
- Harder, Bernd (2018). In Memoriam: Prof. Irmgard Oepen, Gründungspräsidentin der GWUP, July 11, 2018
- Skeptiker magazine (2007). GWUP interview with Irmgard Oepen 3-4/2007
- Hövelmann, Gerd H. & Michels, Hans (2017). Legitimacy of Unbelief: The Collected Papers of Piet Hein Hoebens edited by Gerd H. Hövelmann, Hans Michels, Publisher: LIT Verlag, April 2017, ISBN 9783643908551
- Zeit Online (1993). Der Glaubenskrieg um die Homöopathie eskaliert: Der Bannstrahl des Äskulap (English: The religious war over homeopathy escalates), March 5, 1993
