= Research in Complementary Medicine =

Complementary Medicine Research
- Discipline: Alternative medicine
- Language: German, English
- Edited by: Harald Walach

Publication details
- Former name(s): Forschende Komplementärmedizin und Klassische Naturheilkunde, Forschende Komplementärmedizin
- History: 1994-present
- Publisher: Karger Publishers
- Frequency: Bimonthly
- Impact factor: 1.306 (2018)

Standard abbreviations
- ISO 4: Complement. Med. Res.

Indexing
- ISSN: 1661-4119 (print); 1661-4127 (web)

Links
- Journal homepage

Complementary Medicine Research (German: Research in Complementary Medicine) is a bimonthly peer-reviewed medical journal covering complementary and alternative medicine. Established in 1994, the journal was known as Forschende Komplementärmedizin und Klassische Naturheilkunde (German: Research in Complementary and Classical Natural Medicine) from 2000 to 2005, and as Forschende Komplementärmedizin from then until 2017. The journal is published by Karger Publishers and the editor-in-chief is Harald Walach (Viadrina European University). According to the Journal Citation Reports, the journal had a 2013 impact factor of 1.053. After the journal obtained its current name in 2017, it lost its impact factor.

It is indexed and abstracted in Index Medicus, MEDLINE/PubMed.
