= Johann Grander =

Austrian entrepreneur (1930–2012)

Johann Grander (24 April 1930 – 24 September 2012) was the Austrian inventor of a water revitalization technology, which is scientifically unsupported.

== Life ==
Grander was born in Jochberg, Austria, the second of five children. At the age of 13 the Nazi district leadership deprived him of further schooling and sent him to work as an agricultural tractor driver.

== Revitalized water ==
Grander stated that Jesus had appeared to him and gave him the plan for water revitalization because of his connection with God.

Grander invented a scientifically unproven process for treating water, producing what he called "revitalized water" (German: "Belebtes Wasser"). According to Grander, this improves the water structure and produces a healthy environment for useful microorganisms.

In 1978, Grander founded the Grander family business (Grander GmbH) and focused on research on his technology for original Grander technology. Grander's family continues in activities for the treatment, production and marketing of revitalized water and water treatment equipment.

It is scientific consensus that the claims as to how the process changes water are not supported by physics or chemistry and may be called "esoteric nonsense", in the sense of freedom of speech, regarding a verdict of a lawsuit.

Grander GmbH itself focused on customer evidences and testimonials until 2016. Since 2016 the company claims positive effects for the use of Grander water treatment technology used in the industrial sector or in different trades. Supporters and customers in different professions claim that it cuts the running costs of industry from steel works to fruit canning factories, of public swimming pools, and makes for more effective water-based physiotherapy for injuries.

Nevertheless, the claim lacks any scientific confirmation.

== Legal rulings ==
In 2005 Ecoworld NZ Ltd was fined $60,000 and ordered to pay $68,000 in compensation to consumers that bought their Grander Living Water units. The judge said that the promotional material for these units "contained inconsistencies, quackery and pseudo-science."

In 2006, the Viennese Oberlandesgericht ruled that the claim that seriously ill people may forgo medical treatment and trust in the effects of the revitalized water does not constitute fraud because the vendor guarantees a right of return. They also ruled that Grander's revitalized water may adequately be described as "esoteric nonsense".

In 2009, another New Zealand company, Big Blue Limited involved in the "energised" water using "Wasser 2000 Vibration Technology" was fined $25,000 in the Auckland District Court for making false claims.

== Awards ==
In 2001, the Republic of Austria recognized the life work of Johann Grander with the Honorary Cross for Science and Art. A 2008 parliamentary initiative to strip him of the award on the grounds of missing scientific merits was unsuccessful. The reason given was that the only other person stripped of the award was a Nazi doctor and that Grander's case was less severe.

In 2019 Grander was awarded a Lifetime Achievement Award by the German Society for the Scientific Investigation of Pseudosciences, a price awarded to the "most astonishing pseudo-scientific nuisance".
