= Michael Frass =

Austrian medicine specialist for internal medicine

- Born: 1954 (age 71–72); Vienna, Austria
- Known for: Homeopathy and Combitube
- Awards: Lifetime Achievement Award, Society for Airway Management (2011)
- Scientific career
- Fields: Homeopathy
- Workplaces: Medical University of Vienna

Michael Frass (born 1954) is an Austrian medicine specialist for internal medicine and professor at the Medical University of Vienna (MUW). He is known for his work on homeopathy.

== Biography ==
He is First Chairman of the Scientific Society for Homeopathy (WissHom), founded in 2010, president of the Umbrella organization of Austrian Doctors for Holistic Medicine, since 2002 and since 1994 Vicepresident of the Doctors Association for Classical Homeopathy.

== Homoeopathic research ==
A major interest of Frass is homeopathy. He has published several papers on this subject.

=== Article in the Oncologist ===
In 2020 Frass was the corresponding author of an article in the medical journal The Oncologist which concluded that additional homoeopathic treatment improves quality of life and survival rates in patients with non‐small cell lung cancer (NSCLC). The results of the article were discussed outside of academic circles, for example in the Wiener Zeitung. After criticism (for example from the Informationsnetzwerk Homöopathie), the Austrian Agency for Scientific Integrity (Österreichische Agentur für wissenschaftliche Integrität) concluded that the article contains data manipulation and forgery. The Oncologist released an expression of concern in 2022 and retracted the article in November 2025.

== Airway ==
He has also published several papers investigating the influence of controlled mechanical ventilation on the release of atrial natriuretic peptide. Furthermore, Frass has investigated devices designed for securing the airway under emergency conditions. He has performed studies on a broad range of different alternate airways.

== Invention ==
Rapid assessment and management of respiratory structure and function are imperative in emergency intubation. Endotracheal intubation remains the gold standard in airway maintenance. However, endotracheal intubation may be impossible due to difficult circumstances with respect to space and illumination or anatomy even for skilled physicians. Therefore, the need arises for an alternative. The Combitube was designed with this goal in mind.

Frass is the inventor of the Combitube, a twin lumen device designed for use in emergency situations and difficult airways. He has published several papers on this topic.
