= Walter Krämer =

German economist (born 1948)

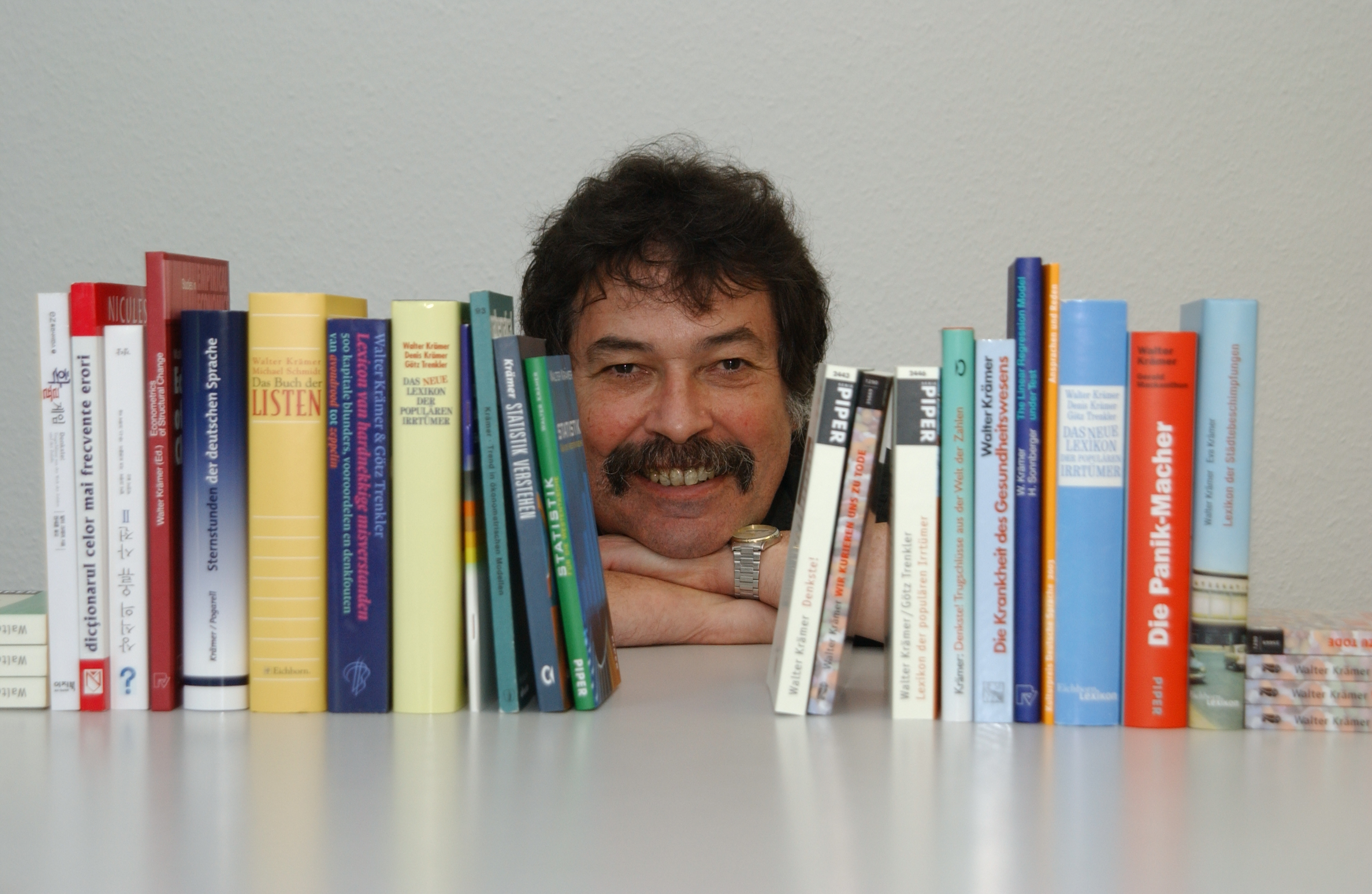
- Born: 21 November 1948 (age 77); Ormont, Germany
- Education: University of Mainz
- Scientific career
- Fields: Econometrics
- Doctoral advisor: Ulrich Kulisch

Walter Krämer (born 21 November 1948) is a German economist. He is a professor for economic and social statistics at the Technical University of Dortmund.

== Biography ==
Krämer studied mathematics and economics at the University of Mainz where he was conferred 1979 a doctorate. He qualified as a university lecturer in econometrics at the Vienna University of Technology. He has been a professor of economic and social statistics at the Technical University of Dortmund since 1988. In addition, he was active as a guest professor at the Management Institute of Fudan University in Shanghai.

In 1997 he founded Verein Deutsche Sprache (German Language Association), where he has shown particular commitment as the chairman against the use of Denglish. Krämer is also a spokesman of the foundation executive board of the Stiftung Deutsche Sprache (German Speaking Foundation). Since 1996 Lexikon der populären Irrtümer (Dictionary of Popular Mistakes) has been published, triggering a wave of publications of similar mistake dictionaries.

Krämer is a member of Gesellschaft der Freunde der Hebräischen Universität Jerusalem (Society of Friends of Hebrew University of Jerusalem), the Ruhr Graduate School in Economics, and the Schweizer Orthographische Konferenz (Swiss Orthographical Conference).

He has been editor of the German Economic Review since 1 January 2008.

Since 2008 Krämer has been a member of the North Rhine-Westphalian Academy of Sciences, Humanities and the Arts.

He is in addition a member of the Gesellschaft zur wissenschaftlichen Untersuchung von Parawissenschaften (Society for the Scientific Investigation of Parasciences).

Krämer publishes Unstatistik des Monats together with the psychologist Gerd Gigerenzer and the economist Thomas K. Bauer on the web site of RWI Essen.

Krämer initiated a call for the euro crisis in 2012 which was signed by more than 270 college lecturers. The professors, under Ifo Institute for Economic Research chief Hans-Werner Sinn, critiqued the euro rescue politics to the federal government. They demanded instead of tax financed bank rescue, the creditors are liable for the debts.

== Political affiliations ==
Krämer has been a member of the Free Democratic Party since 1969. He was also a member of the Social Democratic Party of Germany from 1974 to 1982.

== Plagiarism ==
After a reproach by Die Tageszeitung accusing plagiarism in Lexikon der Städtebeschimpfungen (Dictionary of City Insults) published in 2002, the publishing house compensated afterwards 30 authors of the presentation places for the passages taken without identification and also reached an agreement with the hurt publishing houses Reclam, Hoffmann und Campe, and Suhrkamp Verlag. Die Tageszeitung also got a fee according to information of its own plus Verletzerzuschlag.

== Personal life ==
Walter Krämer is married and has two children.

== Awards ==
- 1999: Deutscher Sprachpreis (German language prize)
- 2013: Medaille der Deutschen Arbeitsgemeinschaft Statistik für Verdienste um die Statistik in Deutschland (Medallion of the German team statistics for contributions to the statistics in Germany)
