= Registered association (Germany) =

Registered voluntary association in Germany

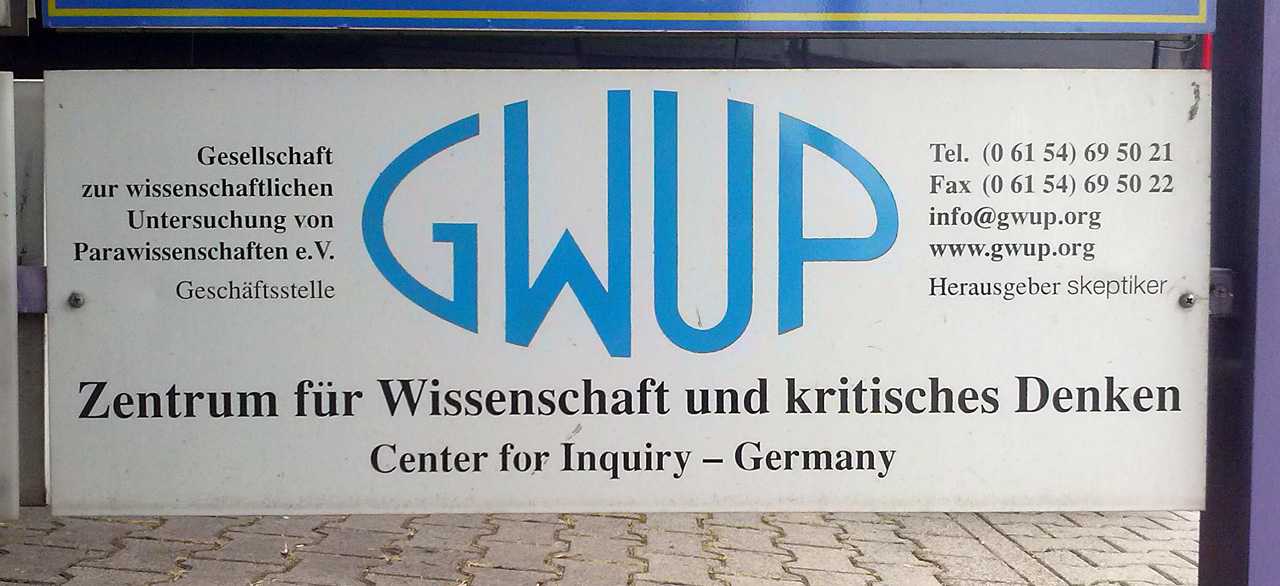
GWUP, an e.V. registered in Germany, but operates in Austria and Switzerland as well

An eingetragener Verein (German: [ˈaɪnɡəˌtʁaːɡənɐ fɛɐˈʔaɪn]; lit. 'registered association'), abbreviated e.V. (German: [ˌeːˈfaʊ]), is a legal status for a registered voluntary association in Germany. While any group may be called a Verein, registration as eingetragener Verein confers many legal benefits, because it confers the status of a juridical person rather than just a group of individuals. The legal status must be mentioned in the name as well. Like certain other corporate bodies, an eingetragener Verein can apply for the status of a charitable organization (Gemeinnützigkeit).

== History ==
The oldest known social club is La Court de Bonne Compagnie, established in London and mentioned in 1413. The club was set up by a group of devout Templars for the purpose of "charitable causes". To represent the professional interests of craft and merchant guilds, societies or clubs were formed in the Middle Ages and Early Modern period, through which community and various social functional spaces (such as guild houses and music guilds of the Meistersinger) and events were run.

Societies based on language were formed in the seventeenth century, with exclusive English upper class gentlemen's clubs of the eighteenth century, Masonic lodges, the literary societies of the Enlightenment, and political clubs of the French Revolution being some of the earliest examples. One of the most notable social clubs of the early period was the Berliner Montagsclub, founded in 1749.

The first cross-class associations were founded in German-speaking countries during the 18th century. As a result of industrialisation during the nineteenth century, modern clubs, societies and federations began to develop, including those focused on culture, education and socialising.

== Legal basis ==
German Civil Code (BGB) section 21 regulates:

Ein Verein, dessen Zweck nicht auf einen wirtschaftlichen Geschäftsbetrieb gerichtet ist, erlangt Rechtsfähigkeit durch Eintragung in das Vereinsregister des zuständigen Amtsgerichts.

— § 21 Nicht wirtschaftlicher Verein, Bürgerliches Gesetzbuch (BGB)

Translated:

An association the object of which does not consist of commercial business operations acquires legal personality by entry in the register of associations maintained by the competent local court.

And section 58 of BGB regulates,

As a rule, the articles of association are to contain provisions:

1. on becoming a member of the association and leaving it,

2. on whether the members are to make contributions, and if so, of what type these contributions are to be,

3. on the composition of the board,

4. on the prerequisites based on which the general meeting is to be convened, on the form required for convening it and on the notarial recording of the resolutions.

And according to section 73, "If the number of members of the association falls below three, the local court is to deprive the association of legal personality on application by the board and, if the application is not made within three months, of its own motion after having heard the board."

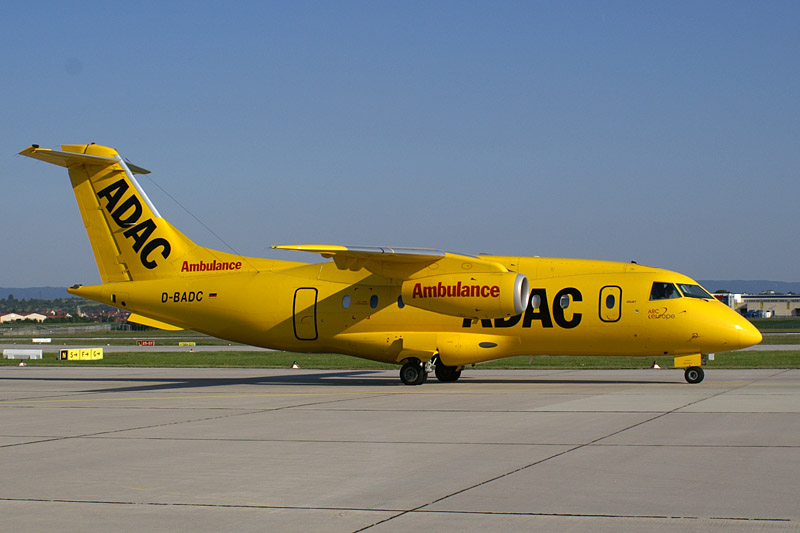
Medical jet flying for the ADAC, the largest German motoring association with millions of car drivers as members

== Registration ==
The registration of Vereine is regulated in the Vereinsregisterverordnung (VRV) (lit. 'Regulations for the registry of associations'). It requires registration of an e.V. with the association registry (Vereinsregister) either kept at the district court of its seat or, if directed by state law, as a centralized register for the Land its seat is located in.

== Differences to other jurisdictions ==
In other German-speaking countries such a distinction does not exist. But there may be legal requirements which oblige an association to register itself; for example, in Switzerland there is no association registry, but an association must be listed in the commercial register if its yearly turnover is high enough to legally require an audit (Revisionspflicht). In Austria, all associations are registered in a special register, and having an e.V. in the name is not allowed.
