= Gesellschaft zur wissenschaftlichen Untersuchung von Parawissenschaften =

Organization promoting scientific skepticism

- Abbreviation: GWUP
- Formation: 1987
- Type: Nonprofit organisation
- Purpose: Popular education and consumer protection
- Headquarters: Roßdorf, Germany
- Region served: German-speaking Europe
- Members: 2000 (2026)
- Chairperson: André Sebastiani
- Affiliations: European Council of Skeptical Organisations
- Website: gwup.org
- Pronunciation of "Gesellschaft zur wissenschaftlichen Untersuchung von Parawissenschaften (GWUP)"

The Gesellschaft zur wissenschaftlichen Untersuchung von Parawissenschaften (GWUP) (English: Society for the Scientific Investigation of Pseudosciences) is a non-profit organisation promoting scientific skepticism, headquartered in Roßdorf, Germany. Its estimated membership in 2026 is about 2000 who are scientists or laypersons interested in science. The GWUP annually hosts a conference with varying key subjects.

== Goals and themes ==
The GWUP regards the critical contemplation of unproven claims in fields such as parasciences, esotericism, superstition, religion and alternative medicine as its main goal. It strives to achieve enlightenment in the sense of popular education and consumer protection. The GWUP underlines the importance of scientific procedures and critical thinking for societal challenges. Besides a theoretical dispute, individuals like dowsers, telekinetics, proponents of energized water scams, practitioners of alternative medicine and astrologers are being criticised and their skills also partially put to empirical examination.

The stated goal of the GWUP is the promotion of critical thinking and the sciences including their methods. Scientific methods should be disseminated, made understandable and applied to parasciences, pseudosciences as well as related belief systems. This also includes educating the general public about the current state of scientific knowledge about parascientific claims.

The GWUP puts a strong emphasis on health topics like complementary and alternative medicine, especially homeopathy. In these areas critical attention is highly indicated, since belief in these inefficacious methods leads to omission of more effective treatments. Furthermore, the GWUP discusses occultism, spiritism, esotericism and ideologies that underlie e.g. anthroposophy. Additionally they cover topics like religion, faith, superstition and creationism. Astrology, fortune-telling and prophecies are scrutinised in a yearly prognosis check. Further topics are conspiracy theories, paratechnologies, cryptozoology, ancient astronauts and UFOs.

In Germany, the GWUP has also engaged in school politics. In 2012, it tried to prevent a state school in Hamburg from experimenting with Waldorf education. The open letter of the GWUP Science Council demanded "to put an enlightened, modern and scientific worldview at the centre of school education instead of esoteric doctrines, without fuss or quibble.

== Organisation ==
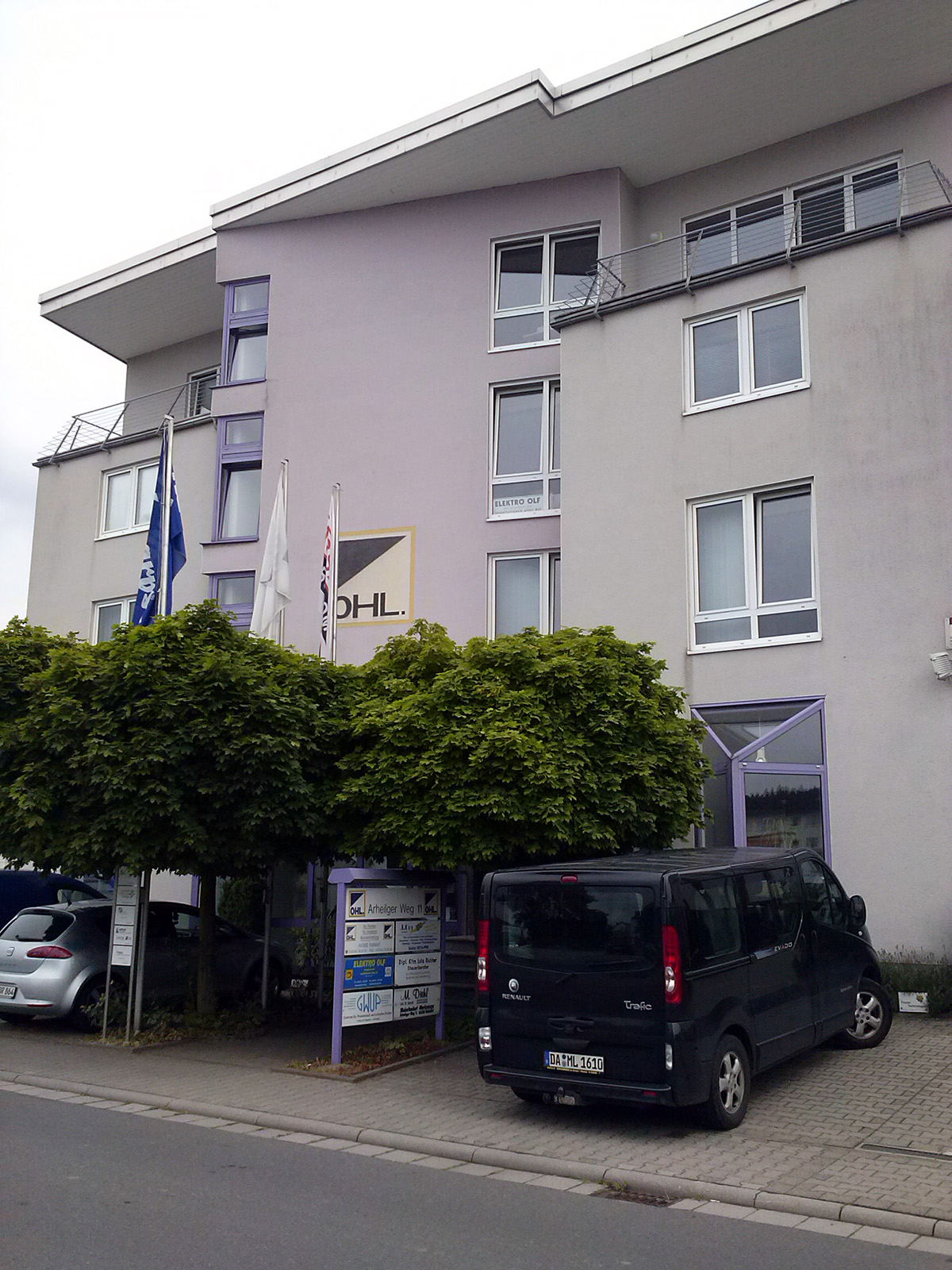
The GWUP headquarters in Roßdorf

The GWUP was founded as an Eingetragener Verein in Bonn on 11 October 1987. It is recognised in Germany as a charitable organisation for its dedication to popular education, and it is headquartered in Roßdorf near Darmstadt. From 2008 to 2023, its chairperson was electrical engineer and CSI fellow Amardeo Sarma, who also presided over the European Council of Skeptical Organisations in 2000–2013. After a year with Holm Gero Hümmler at the helm, as of May 2024 André Sebastiani has assumed the role of chairperson. The GWUP regards itself as the oldest and largest skeptics' organisation in German-speaking Europe and considers itself to be part of the international skeptical movement. As its predecessor organisations, the GWUP cites the informal Arbeitsgemeinschaft der Skeptiker zur Untersuchung von Pseudowissenschaften und Okkultem (ASUPO, "Working Community of Skeptics for the Investigation of Pseudosciences and Occultism", founded on 7 February 1987) and the Deutsche Gesellschaft zur Bekämpfung des Kurpfuschertums ("German Society for Fighting Quackery", founded in 1903, outlawed by the Nazis in 1934). The Society has a scientific advisory council at its disposal, currently presided by Peter Kröling and Wolfgang Hell. The Science Council has an interdisciplinary composition and comprises scientists, scholars and other people from fields such as medicine, psychology, physics, religious studies, biology, pedagogy, folkloristics and cultural anthropology. The Science Council is intended to secure the scientific standards of the Society's work. A representative of the Science Council is delegated to the GWUP board of directors for this purpose.

In Roßdorf the GWUP maintains the Centre for Science and Critical Thinking (Zentrum für Wissenschaft und kritisches Denken), established in 1999 by Martin Mahner. As of May 2024, Mahner has been succeeded as head by philosopher of science and CSI fellow Nikil Mukerji. Each year, the Centre handles hundreds of enquiries from journalists and other individuals. It contains a reference library.

Several regional groups of the GWUP exist in Germany and Austria. They are located in Berlin, Essen (for the metropolitan region Rhine-Ruhr), Hamburg, Cologne, Munich, Stuttgart, Würzburg, Vienna and Untersberg (for the region Salzburg/Freilassing). The Viennese group appears in public as Gesellschaft für kritisches Denken (Society for Critical Thinking).

== Activities ==
=== Conferences ===
Since 1989 the GWUP yearly hosts a conference to make the outcome of their efforts visible to the public. In July 2011 the conference took place with the title "Fact or Fiction" in the Museum of Natural History in Vienna and the Vienna University of Technology. In 2012 the GWUP hosted the 6th World Skeptics Congress from 18 to 20 May in Berlin. In 2013, the conference was arranged in Cologne and was named "SkepKon" for the first time. The 2014 conference was arranged in Munich. 2015 the conference took effect in Frankfurt, while the next two years saw them in Hamburg and Berlin. 2018 SkepKon took place in Cologne again. Notable speakers included Natalie Grams, Lydia Benecke, Anna Zakrisson and Nikil Mukerji. The 2019 SkepKon took place in Augsburg.. Skepkon 2026 was held in Regensburg

=== Das Goldene Brett vorm Kopf ===
The ironic award Das Goldene Brett vorm Kopf is awarded yearly in Vienna. During the 2011 GWUP-conference in Vienna, it was given for the first time, to film director Peter A. Straubinger for his pseudoscientific documentary In the Beginning There Was Light about breatharianism. Straubinger received the award personally. In 2012 the prize was awarded to Harald Walach. The lifetime achievement award was bestowed to Erich von Däniken. In 2013 the prize was awarded to the organisation "Homeopaths Without Borders".

=== Psi test ===
External videos
- Hocus pocus? Testing miracles, Deutsche Welle

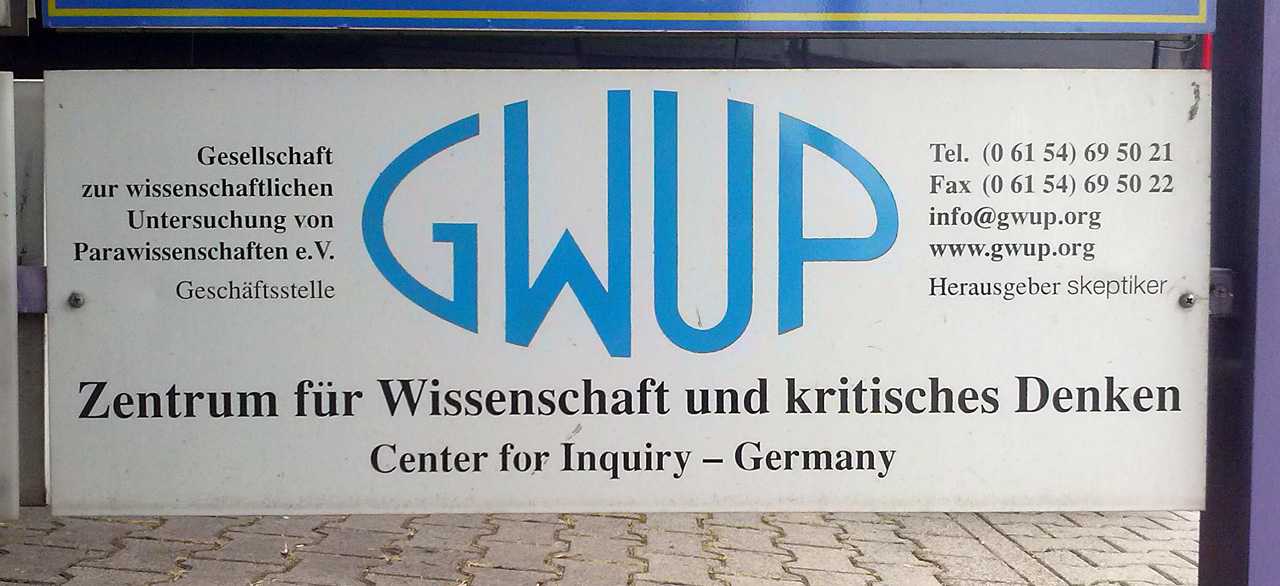
The Centre for Science and Critical Thinking

Since 2004, the GWUP annually performs experiments to test purported paranormal skills. Initially the experiments were conducted in concordance with James Randi as part of the One Million Dollar Paranormal Challenge, later independently. The reward for proof of paranormal abilities is a prize money of 10,000 euros. The testing procedure is agreed upon in advance between the applicant and the GWUP. Until 2010, around 30 candidates have applied to be tested for their psi abilities, most of them dowsers. One Psi test was conducted on 12 August 2013 in the University of Würzburg. The journalist and psychologist Sebastian Bartoschek observed this test. As of 2019 no one has successfully passed the challenge.

=== Prognosis check ===
Since 2002 the mathematician Michael Kunkel yearly publishes a retrospection on the astrological predictions of the past year The predictions are published on Wahrsagercheck ("Fortuneteller Check"). The predictions are mainly from the Internet (about 70%) while predictions in print (newspapers, magazines and books) make up the other 30%. In 2010, 110 predictions from more than 60 fortunetellers and astrologers were evaluated.

=== Homeopathy / 10:23 Campaign ===
The GWUP is a well-known critic of homeopathy. In the year 2005, a petition was initiated against the special treatment of homeopathy as a healing method in Germany. In 2011, the GWUP participated in the international 10:23 Campaign, in which critics of homeopathy took an overdose of highly potentised homeopathic dilutions in public, serving as a warning against the unscientific foundation of homeopathy and the scientifically disproven homeopathic products.

In 2014, the GWUP was mentioned as main critic of the planned bachelor's degree course in homeopathy in Traunstein by several newspapers. Norbert Aust was quoted as saying: "Homeopathy lacks the ambition of a science to study its own foundations. Research in homeopathy aims only to refute the allegation of ineffectiveness", while GWUP chairman Amardeo Sarma remarked that "the proposed College of Homeopathy in Traunstein is academic fraudulent labelling and gives a pseudoscience a higher reputation". In April 2014 the implementation of this course was discontinued.

In May 2018, GWUP issued an invitation to individuals and groups to respond to its challenge "to identify homeopathic preparations in high potency and to give a detailed description on how this can be achieved reproducibly." The first participant to correctly identify selected homeopathic preparations under an agreed-upon protocol will receive €50,000.

=== Skeptics in the Pub ===
Lectures in a pub atmosphere about scientific skeptical topics were held in Hamburg and Berlin. As of May 2024, regular lectures are going on in Vienna. There are currently over 100 groups worldwide conducting this informal meeting format known as Skeptics in the Pub.

=== Fellows of GWUP ===
Since 2018, the German Skeptic journal Skeptiker listed Fellow Board members of international importance for the Skeptic movement. They are:

- Susan Blackmore
- Mario Bunge
- Edzard Ernst
- Krista Federspiel
- Kendrick Frazier
- Harriet Hall
- Britt Marie Hermes
- Bernhard Hoëcker
- Wolfgang Hund
- Irmgard Oepen
- Elizabeth Loftus
- Mark Lynas
- James Randi
- Simon Singh
- Susan Gerbic
- Steven Novella
- Eugenie C. Scott

=== Publications, blogs and social media ===
Since 1987, the Gesellschaft's quarterly journal Skeptiker publishes articles and interviews that are about the core of the organisation's interests. As of 2011, Skeptiker has 2200 subscribers; its managing editor is Inge Hüsgen. The GWUP and several of its members also maintain broadly themed skeptical blogs. The blogs serve the organisation as a supplement to its magazine Skeptiker.

== Notable members ==
- Lydia Benecke (until 2024)
- Edzard Ernst
- Natalie Grams
- Walter Krämer
- Heinz Oberhummer
- Irmgard Oepen
- Amardeo Sarma
- Gerhard Vollmer

== Reception in the media ==
Actions of the GWUP are regularly featured in editor's pieces of the Germanophone mass media. For example, the psi tests of the GWUP and the 2004 One Million Dollar Challenge were presented in the WDR programme Quarks & Co, amongst others. Especially immediately before and during the conference, daily newspapers and online media report on the topics and backgrounds. GWUP members are often invited as experts on television shows about subjects with which the organisation is concerned, for example, Heinz Oberhummer on the topic "Wieviel Unvernunft verträgt die Wissenschaft?" ("How much irrationality can science tolerate?") in the Servus TV programme Talk im Hangar-7, Amardeo Sarma was a guest in the ARD programme Menschen bei Maischberger about "Seher und Propheten" ("Clairvoyants and Prophets"), Klaus Schmeh at the clairvoyance casting in the RTL programme Punkt 12, Bernd Harder in the SWR programme Menschen der Woche about the "end of the world" predictions concerning 2012.

In 2008, a television documentary about the GWUP's psi tests was shown. The film aired on several television stations within German-speaking Europe under the title "Alles fauler Zauber!? Das Übersinnliche auf dem Prüfstand" ("All Mumbo-Jumbo!? The Paranormal Put To The Test"). The Bayerischer Rundfunk reported on the psi tests of 2011 in their television programme Vor Ort – Die Reportage. The Mitteldeutscher Rundfunk reported on the 2012 psi tests.

== Criticism ==
The GWUP faces criticism from the sociologist Edgar Wunder, who has been a founding member. He criticises that the GWUP scarcely investigates paranormal claims and instead primarily promotes a naturalistic worldview. He ascribes the GWUP of prejudiced thinking in "ingroup-outgroup" dichotomies. In a 2014 interview, GWUP chairman Amardeo Sarma stated his position which included the statement that all valid internal and external criticism are and will continue to be addressed.
