= Ruediger Dahlke =

- Born: July 24, 1951 (age 75); East Berlin
- Education: LMU Munich
- Occupation: author
- Years active: 40 years
- Organization(s): Tamanga (S. Steiermark, Austria)
- Notable work: Disease as a symbol; the healing power of illness; peace food.

Ruediger Dahlke (born 24 July 1951 in East Berlin) is best known for the many books and articles on health issues, translated into more than 20 languages. His work centers on psychosomatics, spiritual philosophy, nutrition and esoteric.

== Life and background ==
Dahlke went to school in Freising, and became a Physician with his dissertation on the psychosomatics of childhood bronchial asthma (1978) at LMU Munich.

He continued with further studies and specialised in naturopathic medicine and various types of psychotherapy. This was followed by a long collaboration with Thorwald Dethlefsen.

He went his own ways by setting up a medical center in Johanneskirchen with his first wife Margit Dahlke in 1990, that is still active till today.

From 2010 to 2012 followed the purchase, build-up and start of a health centre Tamanga in Gamlitz, a place in Styria, Austria.

His approach belongs to the alternative medicine, challenging the traditional, evidence-based medicine and therefore he has attracted criticism.

He currently runs his health centre Tamanga, where he gives a variety of seminars on fasting, "connected breathing" and "integral medicine", and offering workshops on various topics promoting health Clemens G. Arvay.

== Books ==
1. The Healing Power of Illness Krankheit als Weg, Sentient Publications, ISBN 978-1591812784
2. Mandalas of the World - a meditation and paintings Guide Mandalas der Welt - Sterling Publishing Co. 1992, New York, N.Y. 10016
3. Heart-Aches - Heart Disease and the Psychology of the Broken Heart Herz(ens)prpobleme - Bluestar Communications Corporation, 1996
4. Krankheit als Sprache der Seele Bluestar Communications Woodside, California
5. Everyday Initiations Lebenskrisen als Entwicklungschancen - Bluestar Communications Corporation, 1999
6. Der Mensch und die Welt sind eins
7. Mandalas for Meditation Arbeitsbuch zur Mandala-Therapie, Sterling Publishing, 2001
8. Disease as a symbol Krankheit als Symbol - M-tec Verlag von Buengner
9. Peace food, wie der Verzicht auf Fleisch Körper und Seele heilt, 2020
