= Harald Walach =

German parapsychologist

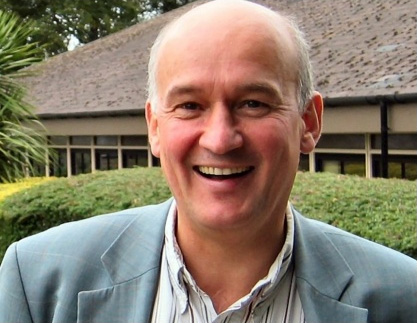
Walach in 2012

Harald Walach (born 1957) is a German parapsychologist and advocate of alternative medicine.

== Background ==
Walach was born in 1957. He received a degree in Psychology from the University of Freiburg in 1984, a PhD in Clinical Psychology from the University of Basel in 1991, and a PhD in History of Science from the University of Vienna in 1995. In 1998 he received his habilitation in psychology from the University of Freiburg. He was affiliated for a time with the Samueli Institute before its closure in 2017.

He worked for a time at the University of Northampton, then as director of the Institute of Transcultural Health Studies at Europa Universität Viadrina, where he led a training course for doctors in complementary medicine and cultural sciences. In 2012, the state of Brandenburg's commission for reviewing Universities concluded that Walach's institute should not be continued within the university.

In 2017, he was a part-time associate professor at Poznań University of Medical Sciences, teaching mindfulness to the international medical students. In July 2021 the university cut its ties with Walach, in response to a paper that he published in Vaccines, stating that Walach's work "misleadingly used data to yield conclusions that are wrong and may lead to public harm."

Harald Walach participated in the 2022 film Homeopathy Unrefuted?, which portrays advocates of homeopathy as they set out to explain this method.

== Publications and fringe claims ==
Walach has conducted studies examining elements of complementary and alternative medicine, and developed the Freiburg Mindfulness Inventory. He was an editor of an essay series on Neuroscience, Consciousness, Spirituality, and until 2021 was editor-in-chief of the Karger journal Forschende Komplementärmedizin.

In 2017, he started the CHS Institute to publish his own writing, including COVID-19 satire and denial.

Walach has advocated for revision of the concept of evidence-based medicine, promoting holistic and homeopathic alternatives in his publications.

Starting in 2001, along with theoretical physicists Hartmann Römer and Harald Atmanspacher, Walach developed what was termed a model of "weak quantum theory" or "generalised entanglement" that purported to explain anomalous phenomena, such as non-specific therapy effects and parapsychological claims. This was not taken seriously by other physicists.

In 2012, Walach received the negative prize "Goldenes Brett" from Austrian skeptics, an annual award for the "most astonishing pseudo-scientific nuisance" of the year. The prize was awarded in part for a masters thesis about the Kozyrev mirror conducted under his supervision, which was widely regarded as unscientific.

Walach was on the scientific advisory board of a blog called "CAM-Media Watch", which was sponsored by the alternative medicine company Heel, among others. The blog described itself as a "spin doctor" for promoting Complementary and Alternative Medicine ("CAM"). In 2012, it was reported that the blog had been paid to smear Edzard Ernst, a scientist critical of homeopathy.

=== Retracted papers ===
As of 2024, Walach has had four publications retracted.

In June 2021, Walach published two high profile papers containing research pertaining to the COVID-19 pandemic, one exaggerating the risks of vaccination, and the other concluding that children should not wear masks. Both papers were retracted the following month.

- The first paper, published in Vaccines, was retracted within a week because of “misrepresentation of the COVID-19 vaccination efforts and misrepresentation of the data,” "several errors that fundamentally affect the interpretation of the findings," and "incorrect and distorted conclusions". Five members of the editorial board of Vaccines resigned when the article was published, protesting it as "grossly irresponsible".
- The second paper was published in JAMA Pediatrics, to immediate criticism. This study was funded by an organization (MWGFD) that was founded to fight governmental pandemic protocols, and is known in Germany for promoting COVID conspiracy theories and distributing anti-vaccine flyers. The journal retracted the paper 12 days later, after the authors did not provide sufficiently convincing evidence to resolve the scientific issues raised about the study.

In 2023, another paper about the efficacy of homeopathy was retracted "due to concerns regarding the analysis of the articles included in the meta-analysis".

In 2025, a paper arguing that the placebo effect was the "main driver of treatment effects in clinical trials" was retracted from the Journal of Clinical Epidemiology

In a press statement, the Poznań University of Medical Sciences dissociated itself from Walach and asserted that his vaccine study "misleadingly used data to yield conclusions that are wrong and may lead to public harm."
