= Heel (corporation) =

American homeopathic company

Logo

Heel is a developer, producer and distributor of homeopathic preparations. It was founded in 1936 by Hans-Heinrich Reckeweg. Heel has offices in 40 countries worldwide including the United States where it is located in Albuquerque, NM.

== History ==
Dr. Reckeweg was a German physician, who received his medical degree in Berlin, who practiced homeopathy. In 1936, Biologische Heilmittel Heel GmbH was founded in Berlin to develop and market his preparations. In 1953 Reckweg moved the company to its present location in Baden-Baden. Between the companies founding year 1936 and 1979 (when Reckeweg relocated to Albuquerque) he developed over 1,000 different homeopathic preparations available through Heel GmbH. When Reckeweg relocated to Albuquerque he created Biological Homeopathic Industries (BHI) and began manufacturing combination remedies in tablet form. In 1997, the Albuquerque company was renamed Heel USA Inc. In 2014, Heel USA became independent from the German Heel organization and operates under the name MediNatura Inc, which now manufactures and distributes BHI products and is the only legal importer of Heel products in the USA. In the USA, there could be multiple semi-independent entities, such as MediNatura New Mexico.

== FDA violations ==
In 1984 BHI received letters and warnings from the Food and Drug Administration that it was in violation of FDA regulations in regards to marketing of homeopathic remedies. BHI was given multiple FDA citations and fines during the 1980s and early 1990s for violation of the Compliance Policy Guidelines labelling guidelines established by the FDA in 1988. These were corrected and have not recurred, though in August 2013 the company again agreed to dial down its health claims tied to its over-the-counter remedies and pay a $1 million class settlement to resolve accusations that it exaggerated the products’ effectiveness to consumers.

== Criticism ==
In 2012, Heel was criticized for funding a German blogger who smears scientists critical of homeopathy.

== Scientific research at the transcriptome level ==
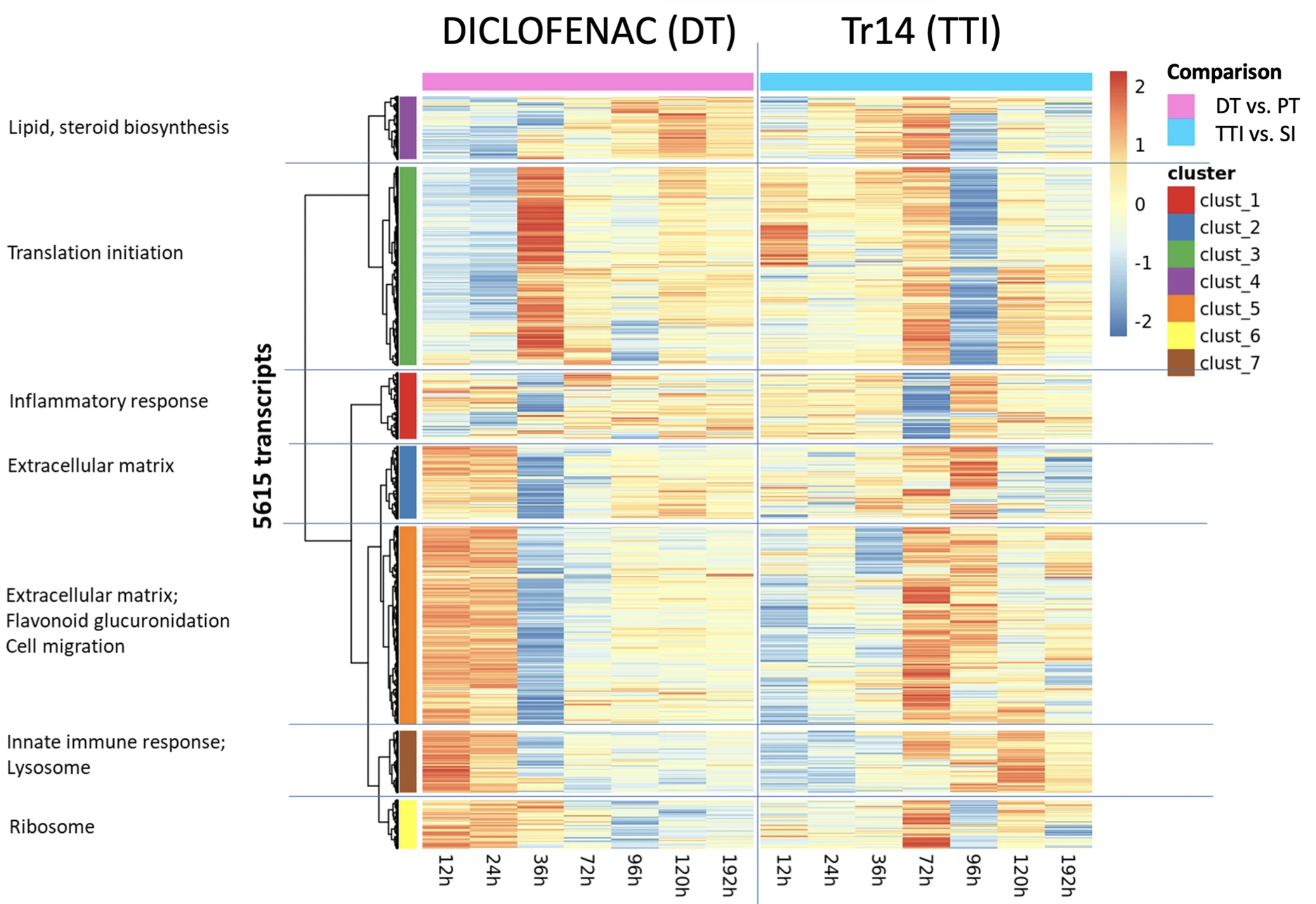

A number of scientific articles have shown the effect of traumeel on gene transcription compared to diclofenac. Tr14 and diclofenac had very different effects on the COX/LOX synthetic pathway after cutaneous wounding. Traumeel allowed normal autoinduction of COX2 mRNA, but suppressed mRNA levels for key enzymes in the leukotriene synthetic pathway. Traumeel appeared to have a broad ‘phytocellular’ effect on the wound transcriptome by altering the balance of cell types present in the wound.
