= Department of Medical Microbiology (Schering AG) =

Medical research department in Germany (1893–2006)

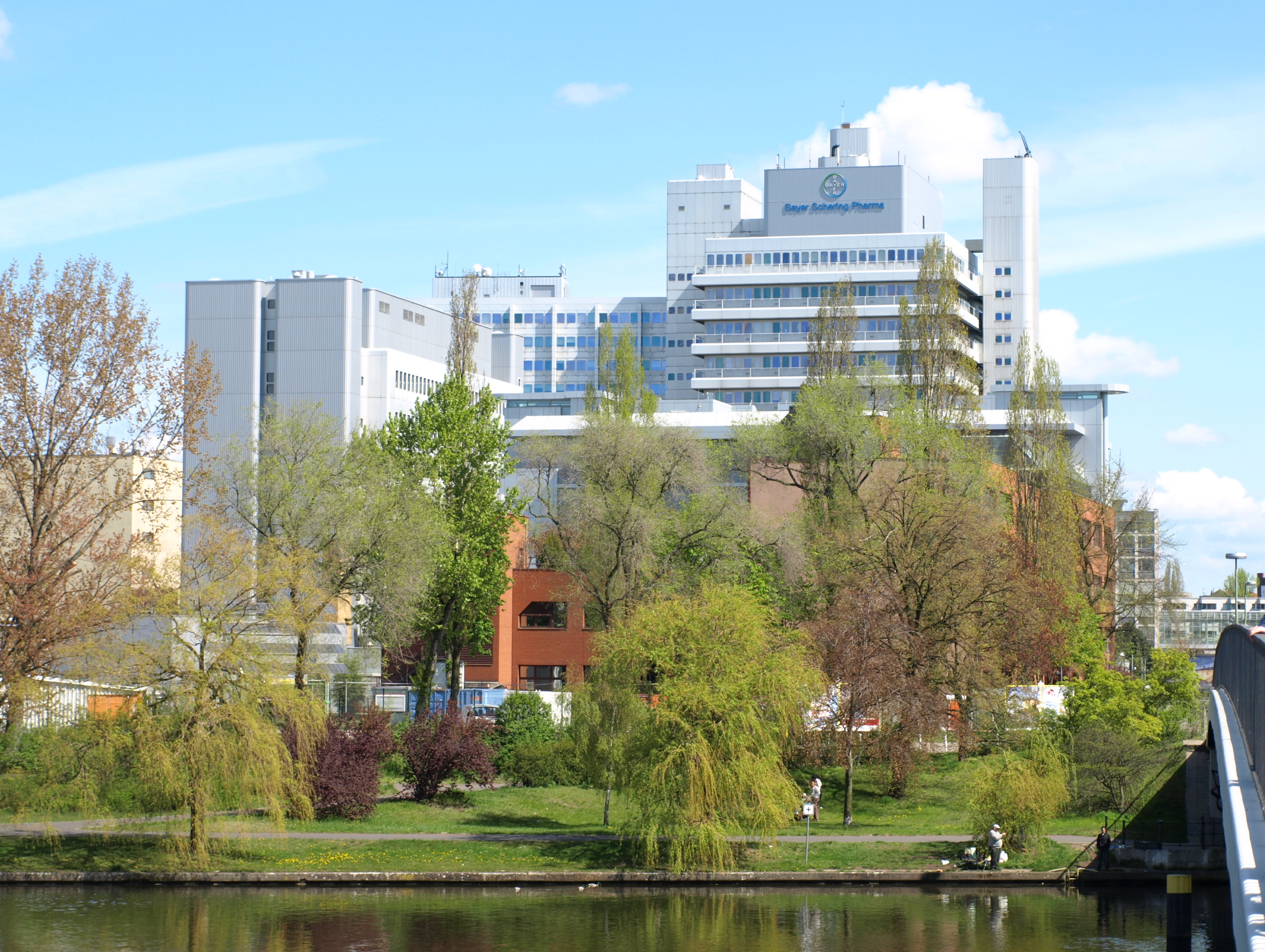
The former headquarters of Schering AG in Wedding, Berlin

The Department of Medical Microbiology (German: Abteilung für Medizinische Mikrobiologie), formerly known as the Department of Bacteriology (German: Bakteriologische Abteilung) or the Institute of Bacteriology (German: Bakteriologisches Institut), was a research department of the pharmaceutical company Schering AG.

== History ==
It was established in 1893, and its first director was Hans Aronson. It was initially located in an old factory building in Charlottenburg which had been only slightly modernized. The institute's 60 horses, whose blood was used in serum research, were in rented stables. Under Aronson's leadership, the institute developed one of the first successful commercially produced antitoxic antisera against diphtheria, in direct competition with Emil von Behring, which was claimed by Schering to be much more effective than Behring's serum. The use of diphtheria antitoxin for the treatment of diphtheria was regarded by The Lancet as the "most important advance of the [19th] Century in the medical treatment of acute infectious disease." The Aronson Prize is named in Aronson's honour.

In the 1920s the institute expanded significantly and took over the entire Schering complex in Charlottenburg, as the other Schering departments were moved to other facilities. The Department of Bacteriology remained in Charlottenburg due to the stables and laboratories being located there. During the Cold War the department moved to Schering's headquarters in Wedding (Müllerstraße 170–172). Georg Henneberg, the institute's former director, became President of the Federal Health Agency in 1969.

As a result of Schering's 2006 merger with Bayer, the former department was integrated in Bayer HealthCare Pharmaceuticals.

== Directors ==
- Dr.med. Hans Aronson (1893–1909)
- Dr.med.vet. Anton Marxer (1909–)
- Dr.med. Georg Henneberg (1940–45)
- Dr.med. Herbert Millberger (1950s)
- Dr.med. A.K.W. Kutzsche (1959–1965)
- Dr.med. Mahmoud K. Muftić (late 1960s)

== Literature ==
- Paul Korn: Geschichte der Bakteriologischen Abteilung der Schering AG 1893–1942
