= Georg Henneberg =

German physician

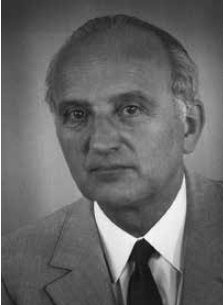
Georg Heinrich Hermann Henneberg in 1950

Georg Heinrich Hermann Henneberg (12 October 1908 in Berlin – 26 February 1996 in Berlin) was a German physician, who served as President of the Robert Koch Institute from 1952 to 1969 and as President of the Federal Health Agency from 1969 to 1974. He was previously director of the Department of Bacteriology at the pharmaceutical company Schering AG.

== Career ==
He was a son of the noted bacteriologist Wilhelm Henneberg. He graduated as a medical doctor in Berlin in 1935 and obtained a doctoral degree in the same year. However, due to having a Jewish great-grandfather, he was denied a medical license. After complaining to the Ministry of the Interior, and enlisting the support of the noted physicians Victor Klingmüller and Ernst Rodebach, the authorities relented and he was given his medical license. After initial difficulty in finding work, he was employed at Schering AG, a company which employed several scientists of Jewish origin who were discriminated against elsewhere. At Schering he became director of the Department of Bacteriology and simultaneously head of the Schering works in Charlottenburg.

In 1950, Henneberg earned his Habilitation at the Free University of Berlin, and became an adjunct professor (apl. Professor) at the Free University in 1956. From 1952 to 1969, he was president of the Robert Koch Institute, and from 1969 to 1974, he was President of the Federal Health Agency.

His assistant Wolfgang Waterstraat was abducted by the Soviets in 1952 and murdered by the Soviet regime in Moscow.

Henneberg was also chairman of the Aronson Foundation.

== Honours ==
- Fellow of the Academy of Sciences Leopoldina (1968)
- Commander's Cross (Großes Verdienstkreuz) of the Order of Merit of the Federal Republic of Germany (1974)

== Selected publications ==
- Einführung in die bakteriologische Untersuchungstechnik zur Penicillintherapie : Versuche zur Demonstration biologischer Eigenschaften des Penicillins, 2. erweiterte Auflage, G.-Fischer-Verlag, Jena 1949
- (Hrsg.): Weg, Ziel und Grenzen der Streptomycintherapie : Unter besonderer Berücksichtigung der chemotherapeutisch bedingten Veränderungen in Klinik und Pathologie der Tuberkulose.(Nach den Ergebnissen in Berliner Kliniken von den Mitgliedern des Streptomycinkomitees und ihren Mitarbeitern), Berlin : de Gruyter, Berlin 1953
- (Hrsg. gemeinsam mit Hartwich Köhler): Praktikum der Virusdiagnostik, Stuttgart : G. Fischer, Stuttgart 1961
- (Hrsg.): Masernschutzimpfung : Gutachten des Bundesgesundheitsamtes nach dem Stand vom Oktober 1968, Springer, Berlin; Heidelberg; New York 1969, (Reihe: Abhandlungen aus dem Bundesgesundheitsamt; H. 8)
- Die Geschichte der Stiftung für experimentelle Therapie - Aronson-Stiftung, Berlin, Selbstverlag 1980
