= Medical Microbiology and Immunology =

- Discipline: Medical microbiology, Virology, immunology
- Language: English, German
- Edited by: V.A.J. Kempf, M.J. Reddehase, C. Bogdan

Publication details
- Former name(s): Zeitschrift für Hygiene; Zeitschrift für Hygiene und Infektionskrankheiten; Zeitschrift für Hygiene und Infektionskrankheiten, Medizinische Mikrobiologie, Immunologie und Virologie; Zeitschrift für medizinische Mikrobiologie und Immunologie
- History: 1886–present
- Publisher: Springer Science+Business Media
- Open access: Optional open access by author payment
- Impact factor: 3.202 (2017)

Standard abbreviations
- ISO 4: Med. Microbiol. Immunol.

Indexing
- CODEN: MMIYAO
- ISSN: 0300-8584 (print); 1432-1831 (web)
- OCLC no.: 478963984

Links
- Journal homepage; Online archive

Medical Microbiology and Immunology is a peer-reviewed medical journal covering all aspects of the interrelationship between infectious agents and their hosts, with microbial and viral pathogenesis and the immunological host response to infections in particular as major topics. It is published by Springer and was established in 1886 by Robert Koch and Carl Flügge, who were the first editors-in-chief for more than 20 years. Originally named “Zeitschrift für Hygiene”, it was renamed multiple times in the light of scientific and medical advances and the emergence of new research disciplines, before adopting its current name Medical Microbiology and Immunology in 1971. The current editors-in-chief are V.A.J. Kempf (Bacteriology), M.J. Reddehase (Virology) and C. Bogdan (Immunology).

== Abstracting and indexing ==
According to the Journal Citation Reports, the journal has a 2016 impact factor of 3.093.

The journal is abstracted and indexed in:

- Science Citation Index
- PubMed/MEDLINE
- Scopus
- Embase
- Chemical Abstracts Service
- CAB International
- Academic Search
- AGRICOLA
- Biological Abstracts
- BIOSIS Previews
- CAB Abstracts
- CSA Environmental Sciences
- Current Contents/Life Sciences
- Elsevier Biobase
- Global Health
- Health Reference Center Academic
- INIS Atomindex
- Referativnyi Zhurnal

== Editors-in-chief ==
The following persons have been editors-in-chief of the journal:

- Robert Koch (1886-1910)
- Carl Flügge (1886-1923)
- Georg Gaffky (1905-1912)
- Fred Neufeld (1918-1944)
- Robert Doerr (1924-1952)
- Martin Hahn (1924-1934)
- Hermann Dold (1934-1944)
- Richard Otto (1935-1944)
- Heinrich Zeiss (1935-1944)
- Heinrich Reichel (1938-1940)
- Friedrich Erhard Haag (1942-1944)
- Ernst Rodenwaldt (1942-1944)
- Hans Schlossberger (1947-1957)
- Walter Kikuth (1957-1965)
- Rodulf Rott (1966-2001)
- Sucharit Bhakdi (1990-2012)
- Bernhard Fleischer (1990-2018)
- Hans Wilhelm Doerr (2001-2017)
- Volkhard A.J. Kempf (2012–present)
- Matthias J. Reddehase (2018–present)
- Christian Bogdan (2018–present)
