= Marxer =

Marxer is a surname. Notable people with the surname include:

- Josef Marxer (politician, born 1889) (1889–1972), Liechtenstein politician
- Ludwig Marxer (veterinarian) (1855–1946), Liechtenstein veterinarian and politician
- Ludwig Marxer (1897–1962), Liechtenstein lawyer and Deputy Prime Minister of Liechtenstein
- Egon Marxer (1920–1999), Liechtenstein politician
- Peter Marxer (1933–2016), Liechtenstein lawyer and politician
- Anne-Flore Marxer (born 1984), Swiss snowboarder
- Anton Marxer (1880-?), German veterinarian, chemist and bacteriologist
- Gunilla Marxer-Kranz (born 1972), Liechtenstein politician
- Gabriel Marxer (born 1960), Liechtenstein politician
- Alexander Marxer (born 1964), Liechtenstein politician
- Manuela Marxer (born 1965), Liechtenstein athlete
- Marlies Amann-Marxer (born 1952), Liechtenstein politician
- Melitta Marxer (1923–2015), Liechtenstein activist
- Marcy Marxer (born 1956), American Roots Musician, actor, GRAMMY Winner
