= Sucharit Bhakdi =

Thai-German microbiologist (born 1946)

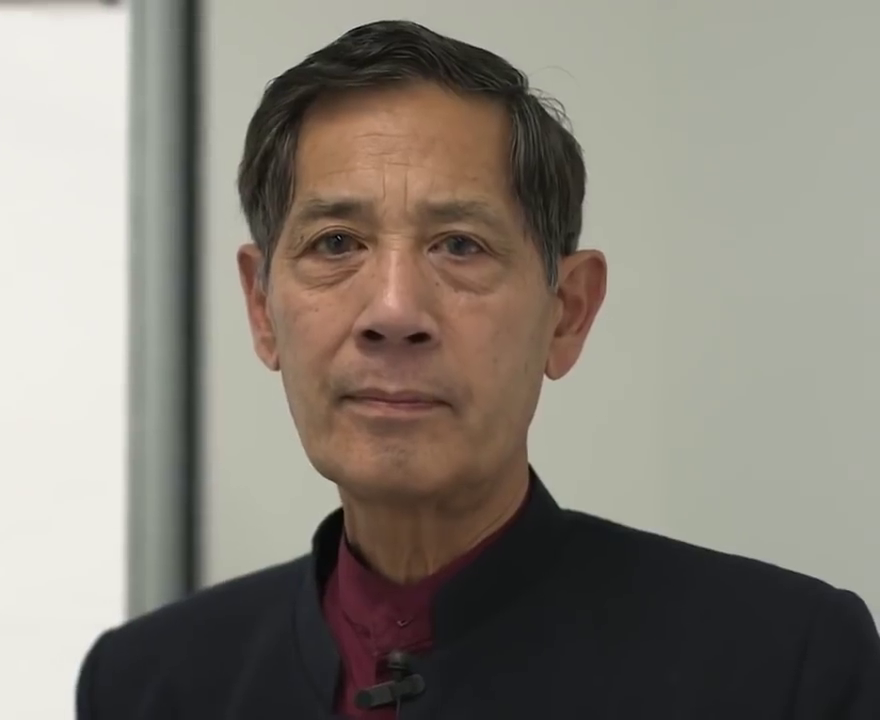
- Born: Sucharit Punyaratabandhu; 1 November 1946 (age 79); Washington, D.C., U.S.
- Education: University of Bonn, University of Giessen, University of Mainz, University of Copenhagen, Max Planck Institute of Immunobiology and Epigenetics
- Known for: Microbiology, fringe ideas about COVID-19
- Awards: Order of Merit of Rhineland-Palatinate, Aronson Prize
- Scientific career
- Fields: Medicine/surgery, bacteriology and atherosclerosis

Sucharit Bhakdi (Thai: สุจริต ภักดี Thai pronunciation: [sut̚˨˩.t͡ɕa˨˩.rit̚˨˩ pʰak̚˦˥.diː˧]) is a Thai-German retired microbiologist. In 2020 and 2021 Bhakdi became a prominent source of misinformation about the COVID-19 pandemic, claiming that the pandemic was "fake" and that COVID-19 vaccines were going to decimate the world's population.

He was a professor at the University of Mainz, where he was head of the Institute of Medical Microbiology and Hygiene. The university has disassociated itself from Bhakdi's views on the coronavirus pandemic. In 2021 Bhakdi's publisher broke off relations following the appearance of an online video in which Bhakdi made antisemitic comments.

== Early life and education ==
Bhakdi was born Sucharit Punyaratabandhu (Thai: สุจริต บุณยรัตพันธุ์), on 1 November 1946, in Washington, D.C.; his father was a Thai diplomat and his mother was a physician. In an interview, Bhakdi stated that his mother studied at Johns Hopkins University in Baltimore. He was spent most of his childhood in Thailand, Switzerland, and Egypt.

Bhakdi studied at the Universities of Bonn, Gießen, Mainz and Copenhagen, and at the Max Planck Institute of Immunobiology in Freiburg.

He studied medicine at the University of Bonn from 1963 to 1970, during part of which (from 1966 to 1970) he was a scholarship holder of the German Academic Exchange Service. Bhakdi worked for a while as a private assistant to the internal medicine specialist Walter Siegenthaler. In February 1971 he received his doctorate in medicine. From 1972 to 1978, he studied at the Max Planck Institute for Immunobiology in Freiburg on scholarships from the Max Planck Society at the Max Planck Institute of Immunobiology in Freiburg and the Alexander von Humboldt Foundation.

He worked at the University of Copenhagen for a year before moving to the Institute of Medical Microbiology at the Justus Liebig University in Gießen, where he worked from 1977 to 1990. In July 1979 he habilitated.

== Scientific and medical career ==
Bhakdi was appointed C2 professor at Gießen in 1982. He spent a further year in Copenhagen and became C3 professor of medical microbiology (at Gießen again) in 1987 before being appointed to the University of Mainz in 1990. From 1991 he headed the Institute of Medical Microbiology and Hygiene as a C4 professor.

In 2002, in the late stages of the mad cow crisis, Bhakdi criticized the mass screening of cattle for bovine spongiform encephalopathy (BSE), describing them as useless and needlessly expensive, arguing that infection and fatal cases were already going down in the United Kingdom.

Bhakdi retired on 1 April 2012. Since 2016 he has been a visiting scholar at the University of Kiel.

Prior to his retirement, Bhakdi produced scientific work in the fields of bacteriology and atherosclerosis, and published multiple scientific articles in these areas.

=== Research career ===
==== The immune system ====
From 1972, Bhakdi researched the functioning of the body's non-specific defenses at the Max Planck Institute for Immunobiology in Freiburg. He contributed to a better understanding of the mechanisms with which the large molecules of the complement system in the blood render exogenous substances harmless. In 1978 Bhakdi discovered a protein that attacks and damages cells by sinking into the cell membrane, resulting in the formation of a pore (see membrane attack complex). This was the enforcer molecule of the complement system, which is formed on the surface of foreign cells as a result of a chain reaction involving the immune system. This was followed by the discovery that bacteria, in turn, can also produce pore-forming proteins. Today it is known that the vast majority of pathogenic bacteria produce pore formers that damage host cells. In 1984 the Royal Society in London invited Bhakdi to present the concept of cell membrane damage by pore formers. From then on, Bhakdi concentrated on research on this topic.

==== Atherosclerosis ====
Investigation of the complement system led Bhakdi to the area of atherosclerosis. In 1989 he discovered through animal experiments that the complement component 5 is activated in the vessel walls where low density lipoprotein (LDL) is deposited.

According to current understanding, atherosclerosis is a polygenic disease caused by a complex interplay of several environmental and genetic factors, especially cholesterol. This is transported in the blood via LDL and absorbed by the cells that need it via cellular receptors. However, it can accumulate in the blood vessel walls during transport and oxidize there or even beforehand. This attracts monocytes, which take up the oxidized LDL and turn into "foam cells". These then trigger chronic inflammatory reactions that damage the vascular wall.

In 1998, Bhakdi and his team of colleagues put forward the "Mainz hypothesis" that atherosclerosis is only caused monocausally by the lack of removal of LDL. According to Bhakdi's hypothesis, LDL is generally not oxidized, but cholesterol is also absorbed by monocytes and foam cells are formed. However, the high density lipoprotein (HDL) can remove cholesterol again. If, however, a certain amount of LDL accumulates locally on the vascular wall and cannot be removed, part of the immune system causes inflammatory reactions that lead to atherosclerosis. In this way, early-stage atherosclerosis could be reversed if the LDL blood level (and blood pressure) was lowered and the HDL level increased. Bhakdi's hypothesis, however, is not reflected in current opinion.

=== Memberships and functions ===
- Member of the Collaborative Research Centres of the German Research Foundation "Proteins as Tools in Biology" at the University of Giessen (1987–1990),
- Deputy Spokesperson of the Collaborative Research Center "Immunopathogenesis" (1990–1999)
- Spokesperson of the Collaborative Research Center "490 Infection and Persistence in Infections" in Mainz (2000–2011).
- Co-founder and board member of the Association of Physicians and Scientists for Health, Freedom and Democracy, which was founded in May 2020 and lost its non-profit status in October 2020. The purpose of the association is to take action against the German government's measures to contain the corona pandemic.

In autumn 2020 he was one of the first signatories of the "appeal for free debating spaces" (Appell für freie Debattenräume, a German adaptation of the project "A Letter on Justice and Open Debate" by the American Thomas C. Williams, which was previously launched in the USA.).

He was Editor in Chief of Medical Microbiology and Immunology from 1990 to 2012.

== Prominence during COVID-19 pandemic ==
During the COVID-19 pandemic, Bhakdi started a YouTube channel proposing that the number of deaths stemming from SARS-CoV-2 infection had been overstated. In November 2020 his account was terminated for violating YouTube's community guidelines. One of his first videos was published 18 March 2020; it went viral, with 300,000 views by 23 March. In the video, he predicted the worst "horror scenario" would be a million infections and 30 deaths a day in Germany, and that death rates in Northern Italy and China were higher only because of high air pollution there (even though Germany typically has more deaths due to pollution than Italy).

Bhakdi has made a number of false statements about the COVID-19 pandemic, saying that the pandemic is a "fake", that face masks and quarantines are "nonsense" and that the COVID-19 vaccines are deadly and will decimate the global population.

He has been otherwise criticised for his theses on the COVID-19 pandemic; according to Medical Tribune, they are considered unscientific by a majority of experts.

=== Bhakdi's criticisms of the COVID-19 pandemic response ===
His criticisms of states' (most particularly Germany's) reactions to the COVID-19 pandemic have included:

- Writing an open Letter in March 2020 to German Chancellor Angela Merkel regarding the "socio-economic consequences of the drastic containment measures which are currently being applied in large parts of Europe"
- Posting videos on YouTube claiming, for example, that the government was overreacting because the virus posed no more threat than influenza, and that any COVID-19 vaccine would be "pointless".
- Participation in May 2020 in the writing of a "position paper of the BMI" by an employee of the German crisis management department. The Federal Ministry distanced itself from the position, calling the paper a "private opinion" circulating on official letterhead, and released the chief government councilor Stephan Kohn from duty.
- He is the co-author of Corona, False Alarm? Facts and Figures (2020), German: ('Corona Fehlalarm?') ISBN 978-3-99060-191-4 and Corona Unmasked. Neue Daten, Zahlen, Hintergründe. (Goldegg, Berlin/Wien 2021, ISBN 978-3-99060-231-7. An earlier book of his was published in 2016, Schreckgespenst Infektionen – Mythen, Wahn und Wirklichkeit (tr. "Bogeyman Infections - Myths, Delusions and Reality") ISBN 978-3-903090-66-8. He published these books together with his wife, Karina Reiss, a biologist and biochemist at the Quincke Research Center, Christian-Albrechts-Universität zu Kiel.
- Describing Germany in December 2020 as a "health dictatorship", saying he wanted to emigrate to Thailand because of this.

=== Responses to Bhakdi's claims ===
Bhakdi's claims, in particular in his YouTube videos and in the book Corona Fehlalarm?, have been extensively fact-checked and found to be variously unsubstantiated, misleading, or false.

In Germany, fact-checking activity has included articles at ZDF, the Austrian independent fact-checkers Mimikama, dpa, SWR3 and the German non-profit correctiv.org. In March 2020, ZDF said "His theses are unscientific, his numbers too low", Mimikama that his statements are "contrary to the scientific consensus of numerous experts, professors and colleagues and was described as largely dubious, unscientific and incorrect". Correctiv fact-checked one of Bhakdi's YouTube videos in June 2020, and found a number of problematic claims, including the claim that any COVID-19 vaccine would be "pointless", and that the virus posed no more threat than influenza.

On the basis of fact checks by Correctiv, ZDF, die Welt, Der Spiegel and Bayerischer Rundfunk, the Süddeutsche Zeitung summed up in April 2020: "What Wodarg and Bhakdi say is not completely wrong, but they mix facts with speculation and disinformation." Writing for Foreign Policy, in September 2020 Tyson Barker (Head of DGAP's Technology & Global Affairs Program) described Bhakdi as a prominent example from a "crop of debunked but credentialed so-called experts minting conspiracy theories and undermining fact-based information".

In October 2020 the University of Mainz issued a statement to the effect that it does not support Bhakdi's views.

== Political activism, antisemitism ==
In 2021, Bhakdi was a founder of the new German political party dieBasis, which emerged from the "Querdenken" political movement, standing as a candidate in the 2021 German federal election in North Rhine-Westphalia. In April 2021, the antisemitism commissioner for the state of Baden-Württemberg identified the Querdenken movement as providing space for antisemitic conspiracy theories, noting that Bhakdi singled out the German-Jewish minister of education in Schleswig-Holstein, Karin Prien, as "poisoning our children with CO2".

In a video released as part of his campaign, Bhakdi articulated antisemitic views, saying Israel is "even worse" than Nazi Germany, adding that "that’s the bad thing about Jews: They learn well...There is no people that learns better than they do. But they have now learned the evil — and implemented it. That is why Israel is now...a living hell". The Austrian publisher of three of Bhakdi's books on the pandemic, Goldegg Verlag, said that it was severing ties with the author. Bhakdi was criticised by antisemitism commissioners for the states of Berlin and Baden-Württemberg. In 2022, he was investigated for Volksverhetzung related to his 2021 statements, particularly the claim that the vaccine mandate was "a second Holocaust", but charges were dropped as it was concluded that the statement had multiple meanings.

== Awards ==
=== Professional awards ===
- 1979 Justus Liebig University Giessen Prize
- 1980 Konstanz Medicine Prize
- 1987 German Society for Microbiology Prize
- 1988 Dr. Friedrich Sasse Prize
- 1989 Ludwig Schunk Prize for Medicine
- 1989 Robert-Koch-Förderpreis of Clausthal-Zellerfeld
- 1991 Gay-Lussac Humboldt Prize
- 2001 Aronson Prize for „wegweisende Arbeiten auf dem Gebiet des Komplementsystems und bakterieller Toxine“ tr. "pioneering work in the field of the complement system and bacterial toxins"
- 2005 H. W. Hauss Award
- 2005 Verdienstorden des Landes Rheinland-Pfalz
- 2009 Rudolf-Schönheimer Medal of the German Society for Arteriosclerosis Research

=== Negative award ===
Following the publicity accorded to Bhakdi's statements and publications regarding COVID-19 during 2020, the Gesellschaft zur wissenschaftlichen Untersuchung von Parawissenschaften (English: Society for the Scientific Investigation of Pseudosciences) named him as winner of the 2020 Goldenes Brett, awarded to Bhakdi as the "most astonishing pseudo-scientific nuisance" of the year.
