= Dold =

Dold is a surname. Notable people with the surname include:

- Albrecht Dold (1928–2011), German mathematician
- Bob Dold (born 1969), American politician
- Brian Dold (1930–1976), South African cricketer
- Chris Dold (born 1987), Canadian sailor
- Douglas Dold (1895–1980), South African cricketer
- Erwin Dold (1919–2012), German concentration camp commandant in World War II
- Hermann Dold (1882–1962), German physician and bacteriologist
- John Dold (1902–1968), South African rugby player and cricketer
- R. Bruce Dold (1955–2025), American journalist
- Thomas Dold (born 1984), German athlete
- Yvonne Dold-Samplonius (1937–2014), Dutch mathematician and historian

== See also ==
- Samuel Dold Morgan, American businessman, builder, and manufacturer
