= Erich Lexer =

German surgeon (1867–1937)

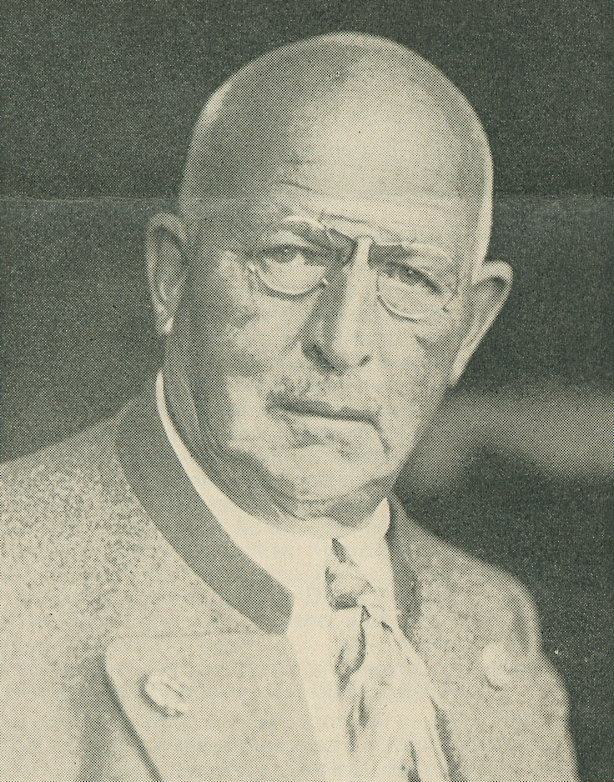
Erich Lexer.

Erich Lexer (22 May 1867 in Freiburg im Breisgau – 4 December 1937 in Berlin) was a German surgeon and university lecturer. With Eugen Holländer (1867–1932) and Jacques Joseph (1865–1934), he is regarded as the pioneer of plastic surgery.

He studied medicine at the University of Würzburg, afterwards working as an assistant to Friedrich Sigmund Merkel at the University of Göttingen (1891), and to Ernst von Bergmann at the Friedrich Wilhelm University of Berlin (from 1892). Later on, he was a professor of surgery at the University of Königsberg (1905–1910), the University of Jena (1910–1919), and the University of Freiburg (1919–1928). In 1928, he succeeded Ferdinand Sauerbruch at the university clinic of the Ludwig-Maximilians-Universität München (1928–1936).

He is remembered for his introduction of surgical techniques associated with plastic and cosmetic surgery. He is credited for his pioneer research of forehead lift surgery as a means to lessen the signs of aging in the upper part of the face. In 1921 he pioneered a technique for mammaplastic surgery, a procedure that later became popular in the 1950s. Lexer is also credited as the first physician to advocate subcutaneous mastectomy for treatment of fibrocystic breast disease.

Today, the Erich Lexer Clinic for Aesthetic-Plastic Surgery at the Freiburg Medical Centre is named in his honor.

== Published works ==
He was the author of a popular surgical textbook, "Lehrbuch der allgemeinen Chirurgie". First published in 1904, it was issued over numerous editions and also translated into English. Other writings by Lexer include:

- Die Ätiologie und Die Mikro-organismen Der Akuten Osteomyelitis, 1897 – The etiology and the microorganisms associated with acute osteomyelitis.
- Untersuchungen über Knochenarterien, 1904.
- Die freien Transplantationen, 1924 – The "free" transplantation.
- Die gesamte Wiederherstellungschirurgie, 1931 – The total reconstructive surgery.
