= Weißensee cemetery =

Jewish cemetery in Weißensee, Berlin, Germany

Coordinates: 52°32′41″N 13°27′30″E

Weißensee Cemetery
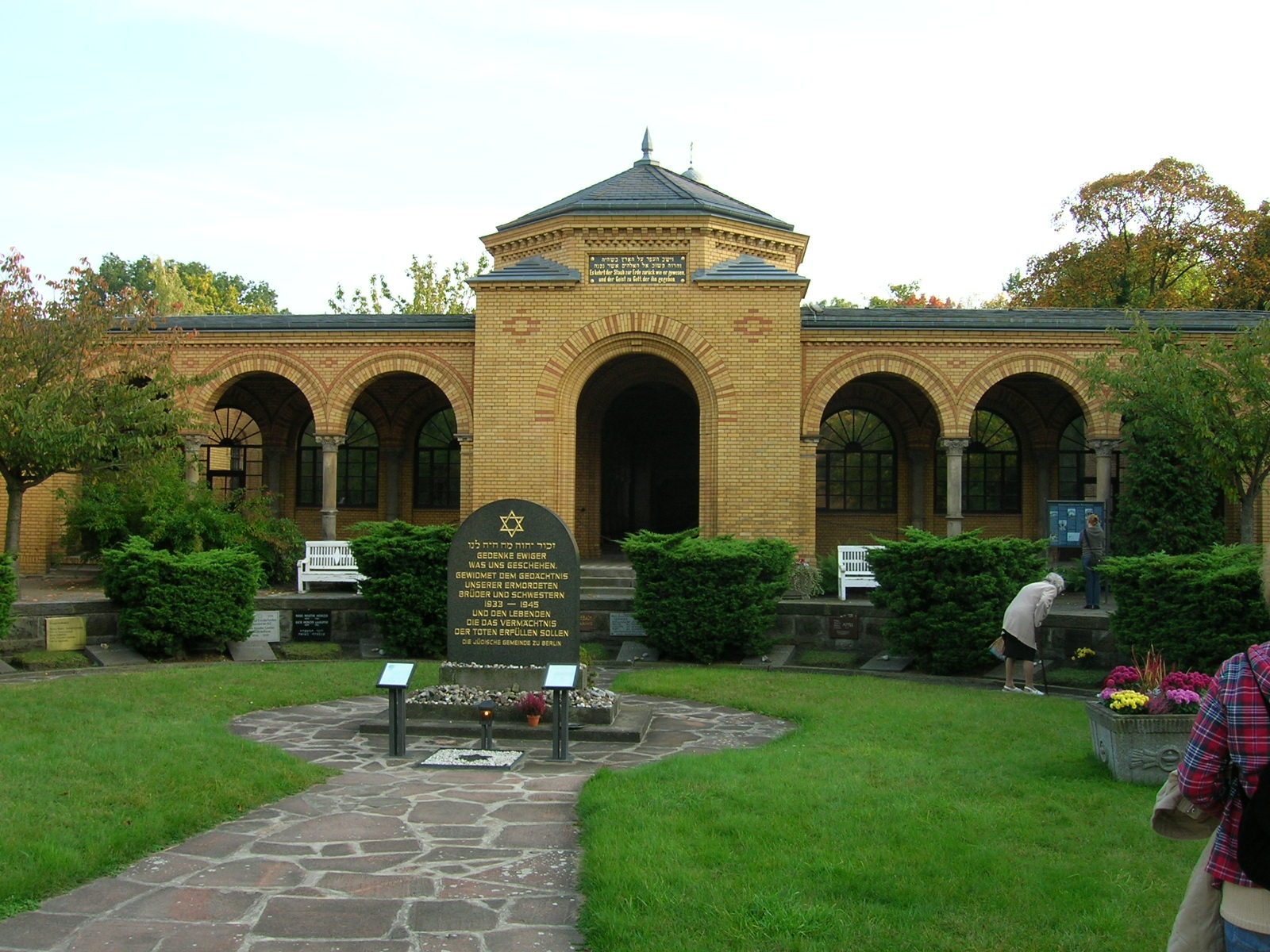
- Entrance building
- Interactive map of Weißensee Cemetery

Details
- Established: 1880
- Location: Weißensee, Berlin
- Country: Germany
- Type: Jewish cemetery
- Size: 42 ha (100 acres)
- No. of graves: 115,000

The Weißensee Cemetery (German: Jüdischer Friedhof Berlin-Weißensee) is a Jewish cemetery located in the neighborhood of Weißensee in Berlin, Germany. It is the second largest Jewish cemetery in Europe. The cemetery covers approximately 42 ha (100 acres) and contains approximately 115,000 graves. It was dedicated in 1880.

== Entrance ==
The main entrance is at the end of the Herbert-Baum-Straße. In 1924, a second entrance was constructed off Lichtenberger Straße (which was renamed Indira-Gandhi-Straße in 1985).

Directly in front of the entrance is a Holocaust memorial, a commemorative stone, surrounded by further stones, each with the names of concentration camps. Next to this, there is a memorial to Jews who lost their lives during World War I (which was dedicated in 1927) and also a commemorative plaque to those who fought Nazism.

== Construction of the cemetery ==
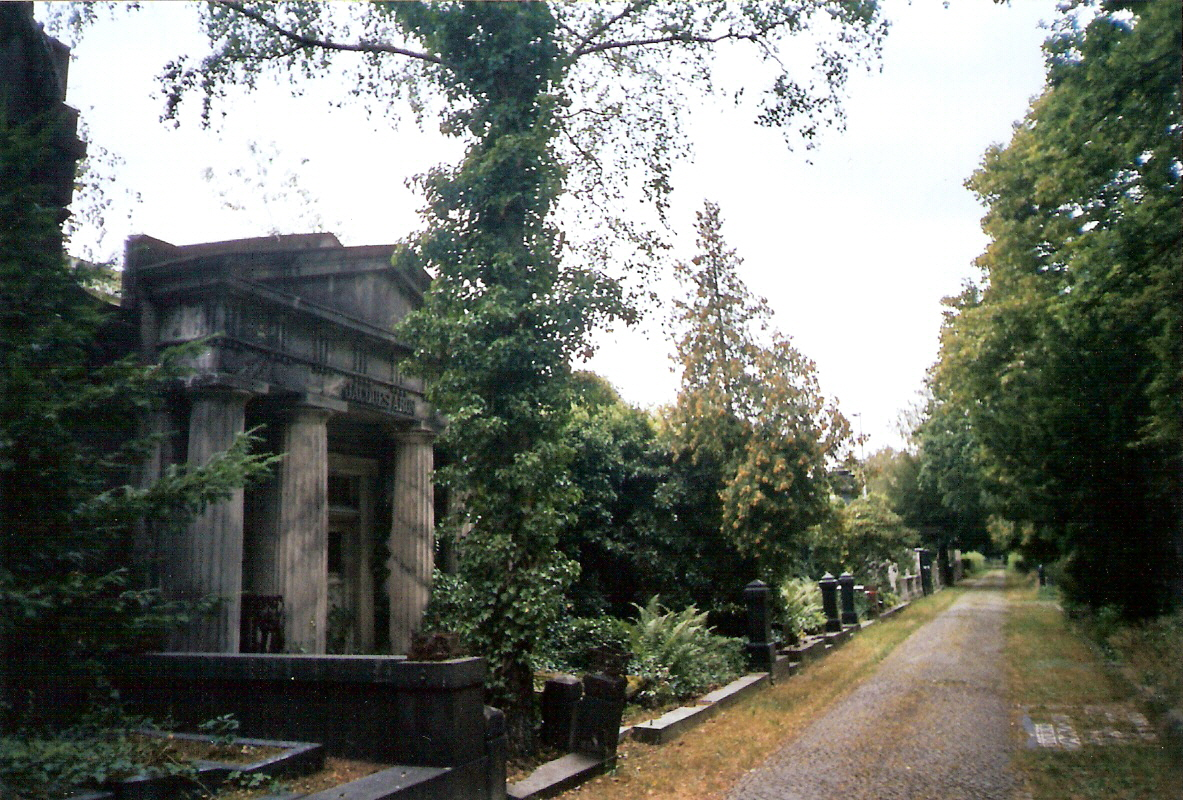
Example of Neoclassical mausoleums which run round the edge of the cemetery

The plot of land was bought by the Jewish community of Berlin, comprising – besides congregants of Orthodox and Reform affiliation – mostly observants of mainstream Judaism (in today's terms described at best as Conservative Judaism). The old Jewish cemetery in Große Hamburger Straße, opened 1672, had reached its full capacity in 1827. The second cemetery in Schönhauser Allee, opened in the same year, reached its capacity in the 1880s, offering only few remaining gravesites in family ensembles mostly reserved for widows and widowers next to their earlier deceased spouses. Weißensee Cemetery was designed by renowned German architect Hugo Licht in the Italian Neorenaissance style. It was inaugurated in 1880. The surrounding walls and main building (where the archives are kept and the cemetery is administered) were constructed with a distinctive yellow brick. A second building (built in 1910) was destroyed during World War II.

The grave plots are arranged into 120 different sections, each with its own geometric shape. Well-to-do individuals and families built their mausoleums using more complex, Art Nouveau, designs.

The periphery of the cemetery is predominantly reserved for the upper and middle classes, while the center is occupied by the less well off, in areas which are harder to reach and often overgrown by foliage.

With the rise of Nazism the existence of the cemetery was at risk (many Jewish cemeteries in Europe were destroyed) but the site survived relatively unscathed. Some 4,000 graves are estimated to have been damaged by Allied bombing.

== Post-World War II ==
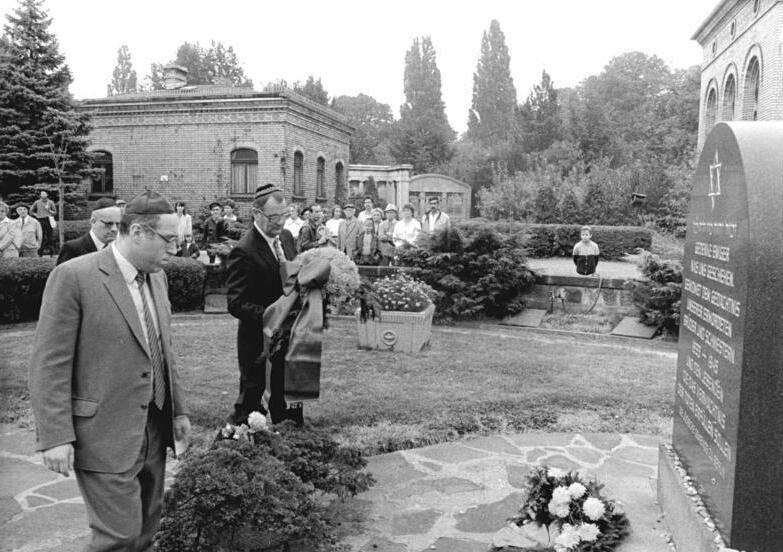
September 1988

After World War II, Jews from all parts of Berlin continued to use the cemetery until 1955. Between 1955 and German reunification in 1990, only the small Jewish community in East Berlin used it.

During the four decades of the German Democratic Republic, the cemetery was relatively neglected because most of Berlin's Jewish community had been murdered during, or had fled from, the Holocaust. Many of the graves were left unattended and became overgrown with weeds.

In the 1970s, plans to build an expressway over part of the cemetery were considered, linking Michelangelostraße to the newly constructed Hansastraße. This proposal was dropped due to strong objections from the remaining Jewish community.

It has been estimated by cemetery officials that the cost of fully repairing the damage caused by years of neglect would amount to 40 million euros. On the occasion of the cemetery's 125th anniversary, appeals were made to the Berlin government to increase funding, so that a bid can be made to add the site to the UNESCO world heritage list. The bid was supported by Berlin's former mayor Klaus Wowereit.

The cemetery is open to visitors, and the index of grave sites is largely intact.

== Cemetery of the Orthodox congregation Adass Jisroel ==
About two kilometres northeast of the Weißensee Cemetery, in Wittlicher Straße also in the Weißensee locality, the Orthodox congregation Adass Jisroel has operated its own cemetery since 1873. So far it contains about 3,000 graves, including those of:

- Siegmund Breitbart
- Esriel Hildesheimer

== Notable interments ==
- Hermann Aron, engineer
- Hans Aronson, physician
- Herbert Baum, anti-Fascist resistance fighter
- Micha Josef Berdyczewski, Hebrew scholar and journalist
- Oskar Cassel, politician
- Hermann Cohen, philosopher
- Julius Falkenstein, actor
- Samuel von Fischer, publisher, founder of the S. Fischer Verlag
- Richard Friedländer, businessman, adoptive father (and possibly biological father) of Magda Goebbels
- Josef Garbáty, cigarette manufacturer
- Nahum Gergel, Jewish activist, author and sociologist
- Eugen Goldstein, physicist
- Moritz Heimann, author and journalist
- Stefan Heym, author
- Max Hirsch, political economist and founder of the German trade unions
- Johannes Holzmann (pseudonym Senna Hoy), anarchist writer and activist
- Jacques Joseph, plastic surgeon
- Max Jaffe, biochemist
- Berthold Kempinski, Berlin wine merchant and founder of Kempinski Hotels
- Günter Kunert, writer
- Louis Lewandowski, composer
- Rudolf Mosse, newspaper publisher
- Benno Orenstein, industrialist
- Werner Scholem, member of the Reichstag
- Tom Seidmann-Freud, artist and writer
- Gustav Solomon Oppert, Indologist and Sanskritist
- Moritz Steinschneider, bibliographer and Orientalist
- Hermann Tietz, department store founder
- Wilhelm Traube, chemist
- Lesser Ury, painter
- Joseph Weizenbaum, computer scientist
- Theodor Wolff, author and journalist
