= Forehead lift =

- Specialty: Cosmetic surgery

A forehead lift, also known as a browlift or browplasty, is a cosmetic surgery procedure used to elevate a drooping eyebrow that may obstruct vision and/or to remove the deep "worry" lines that run across the forehead.

== History ==
The first documented medical discussion about a forehead lift was written in 1910 by the German surgeon Erich Lexer.

== Current surgical techniques ==
Since the advent of the hugely popular wrinkle remover, Botox (Dysport in the United Kingdom and Europe) many consumers have eschewed the invasive surgery altogether, opting for Botox injections every four to six months to get the same results. Botox is also used after some forehead lift procedures to increase the effects of the surgeries.

Endoscopic surgery is often employed in forehead lifts. An endoscope is a surgical system with thin, pencil-sized arms that are inserted through three to five incisions about 3/8 of an inch long. One of the instrument's arms is a lighted camera that displays what it sees under the patient's skin on a television monitor. Other arms on the Endoscope carry actual surgical tools that perform cutting or grasping functions. The surgeon watches the television monitor to guide his movements.

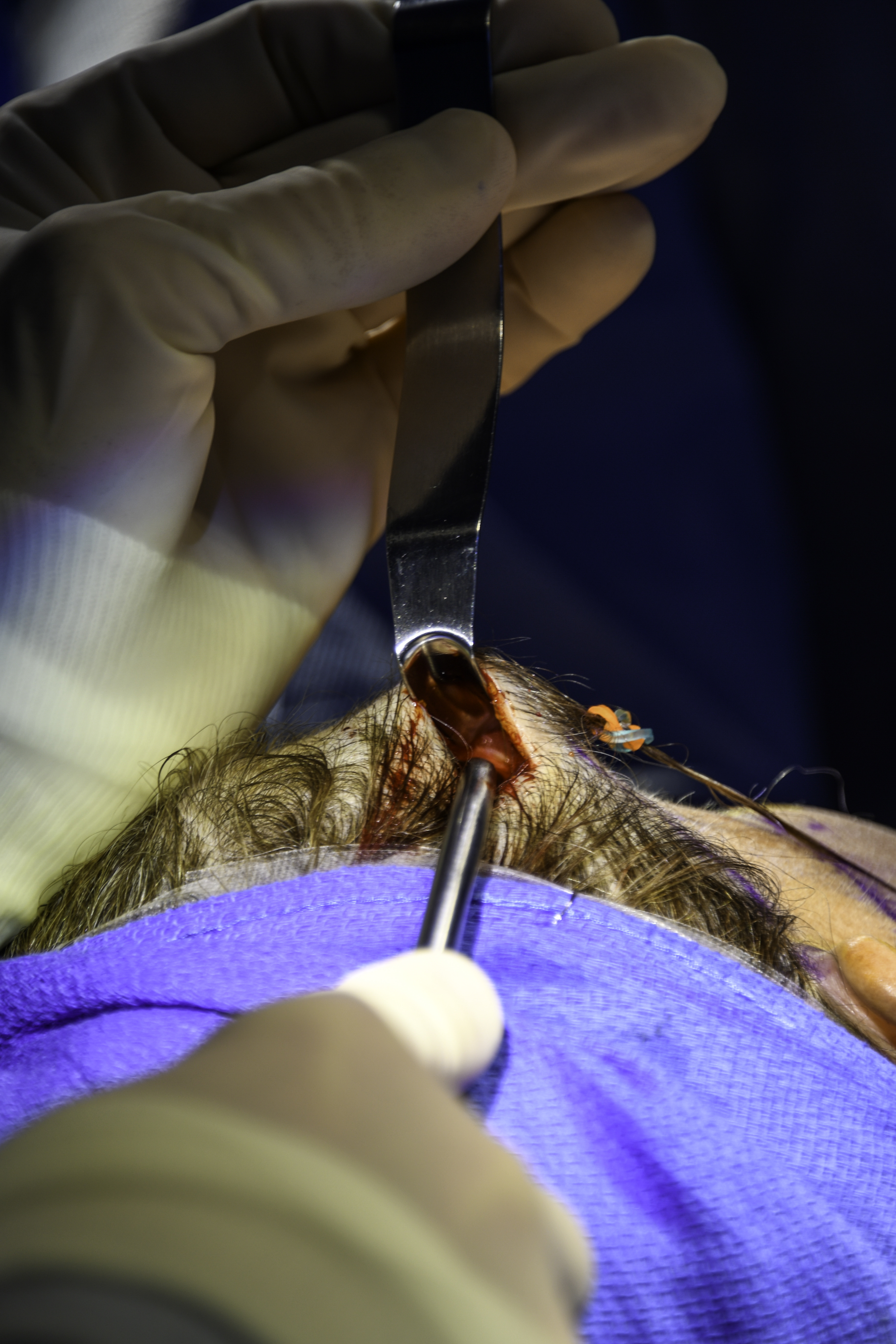
Subcutaneous dissection during a temporal brow lift procedure.

Another type of surgical technique is the coronal brow lift, in which a bicoronal incision is made. This technique was popularized in the 1980s and 1990s, but has fallen out of favor compared to the endoscopic technique. Other techniques include the direct brow lift, mid-forehead brow lift, pretrichial brow lift, temporal brow lift, and internal (transblepharoplasty) brow lift.

== Risks ==
When surgeons have problems with an endoscopic forehead lift, – in about one percent of cases – they finish the procedure by switching to the open forehead lift method.

Complications are said to be rare and minor when a forehead lift is performed by a surgeon trained in the technique. The highest revision rates have occurred following hairline brow lifts, while numbness was the most common complication in direct brow lifts. Hair loss is noted to be most common following endoscopic brow lifts. Moreover, infection and bleeding are possible with any surgical procedure. Compared to endoscopic techniques, coronal brow lift techniques have a higher risk of elevating the frontal hairline and decreasing scalp sensation.

Patients who have Endotine implants in their foreheads risk moving their newly adjusted tissues with relatively small movements just after the operation and before complete healing takes place. While the implant absorbs into the body, the Endotine generally does not support the very thick forehead flesh and heavy brows often seen in some overweight males.
