= Anton Marxer =

German veterinarian (born 1880)

Anton Marxer (born 11 May 1880 in Saverne) was a German veterinarian, chemist and bacteriologist. He succeeded Hans Aronson as director of the Department of Bacteriology at the pharmaceutical company Schering AG in 1909.

He studied veterinary medicine at the veterinary colleges of Munich, Stuttgart and Berlin, and obtained a doctoral degree in veterinary medicine (Dr.med.vet.). He also attended the Technical University of Munich, the University of Berlin and the University of Strasbourg.

== Selected publications ==
- Marxer A. Beitrag zur Frage des Bakteriengehaltes und der Haltbarkeit des Fleisches bei gewöhnlicher Aufbewahrung, Strasbourg, 1903, 46 pages.
- Marxer A. Technik der Impfstoffe und Heilsera. Brunswick, Vieweg, 1915, 319 pages.
