= Karin Mölling =

German virologist

Karin Mölling (often cited in English as Moelling; born 7 April 1943 in Meldorf, Dithmarschen, Germany) is a German virologist whose research focused on retroviruses, particularly human immunodeficiency virus (HIV). She was a full professor and director of the Institute of Medical Virology at the University of Zurich from 1993 to 2008. She is retired but retains affiliations with the University of Zurich and with the Max Planck Institute for Molecular Genetics in Berlin.

== Education and career ==
Mölling was born in Meldorf, Dithmarschen, Germany in 1943. She received a Diploma in nuclear physics in 1968 from the University of Kiel. After a fellowship for training in molecular biology at the University of California, Berkeley, she returned to Germany for her PhD at the Max Planck Institute for Virus Research (now the Max Planck Institute for Developmental Biology), awarded in 1972. She was a postdoctoral fellow at the Robert Koch Institute and later at the University of Giessen, where she took her Habilitation in biophysics in 1977.

She began her independent research career as a group leader at the Max Planck Institute for Molecular Genetics in 1976 and remained there till 1993, becoming a Heisenberg Fellow in 1981 and a permanent group leader in 1983. In 1993 she became a full professor and director of the Institute of Medical Virology at the University of Zurich and held these positions until 2008. She continued as a group leader at Zurich and a Fellow at MPI until 2011. As of 2014, she retained affiliations with both institutions.

During her academic career Mölling also co-founded several biotechnology companies, was involved in a clinical trial for an HIV vaccine candidate, and supervised around 100 master's and PhD students.

== Research ==
Mölling's research interests focused primarily on retroviruses, particular human immunodeficiency virus (HIV), on which she began work as a graduate student. She is well known for her discovery of the ribonuclease H activity of reverse transcriptase, which is required for viral proliferation. Her work in this area led to the development of a DNA-based candidate HIV vaccine for which she led clinical trials. She has also worked on oncogenes, leading to the isolation of the Myc transcription factor protein; on virus diagnostics; and more recently on the evolutionary history of retroviruses and retrotransposons.

== Awards and honors ==
Mölling has received a number of academic recognitions during her career:

- 1981: Vincenz Czerny Prize
- 1982: Richtzenhain Prize
- 1983: Member, European Molecular Biology Organization
- 1986: Meyenburg Prize
- 1987: Aronson Prize
- 1992: Ansmann Prize
- 2008: SwissAward
- 2008-09: Fellow, Berlin Institute for Advanced Study

== Publications ==
Books:

- Das Aids-Virus. VCH, Weinheim 1988, ISBN 3-527-15379-9.
- Supermacht des Lebens – Reise in die erstaunliche Welt der Viren. C. H. Beck, München 2014, ISBN 978-3-406-66969-9.
- Auf den Spuren von Semper, Wagner und den anderen. Edition Braus, Berlin 2019, ISBN 978-3-862-28198-5.
- Viren – Supermacht des Lebens. C. H. Beck, München 2020, ISBN 978-3-406-76029-7.

Audio-CD:

- Karin Mölling erzählt: Das Leben der Viren. Konzeption/Regie: Klaus Sander. Supposé, Berlin 2009, ISBN 978-3-932513-90-9.
