= Hermann Aron =

German researcher of electrical engineering

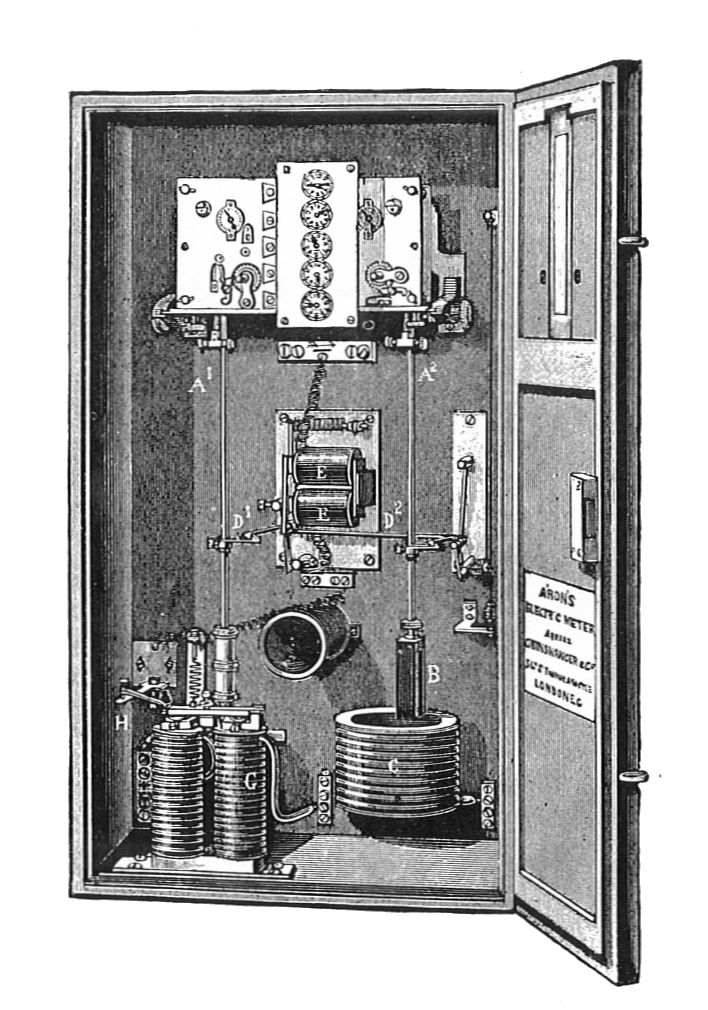
Dr Aron's pendulum meter, as sold in Great Britain by GEC, from 1888. One pendulum bob is labeled as "B". Originally, the meter could be used only for direct current. Later, it was adapted for AC power.

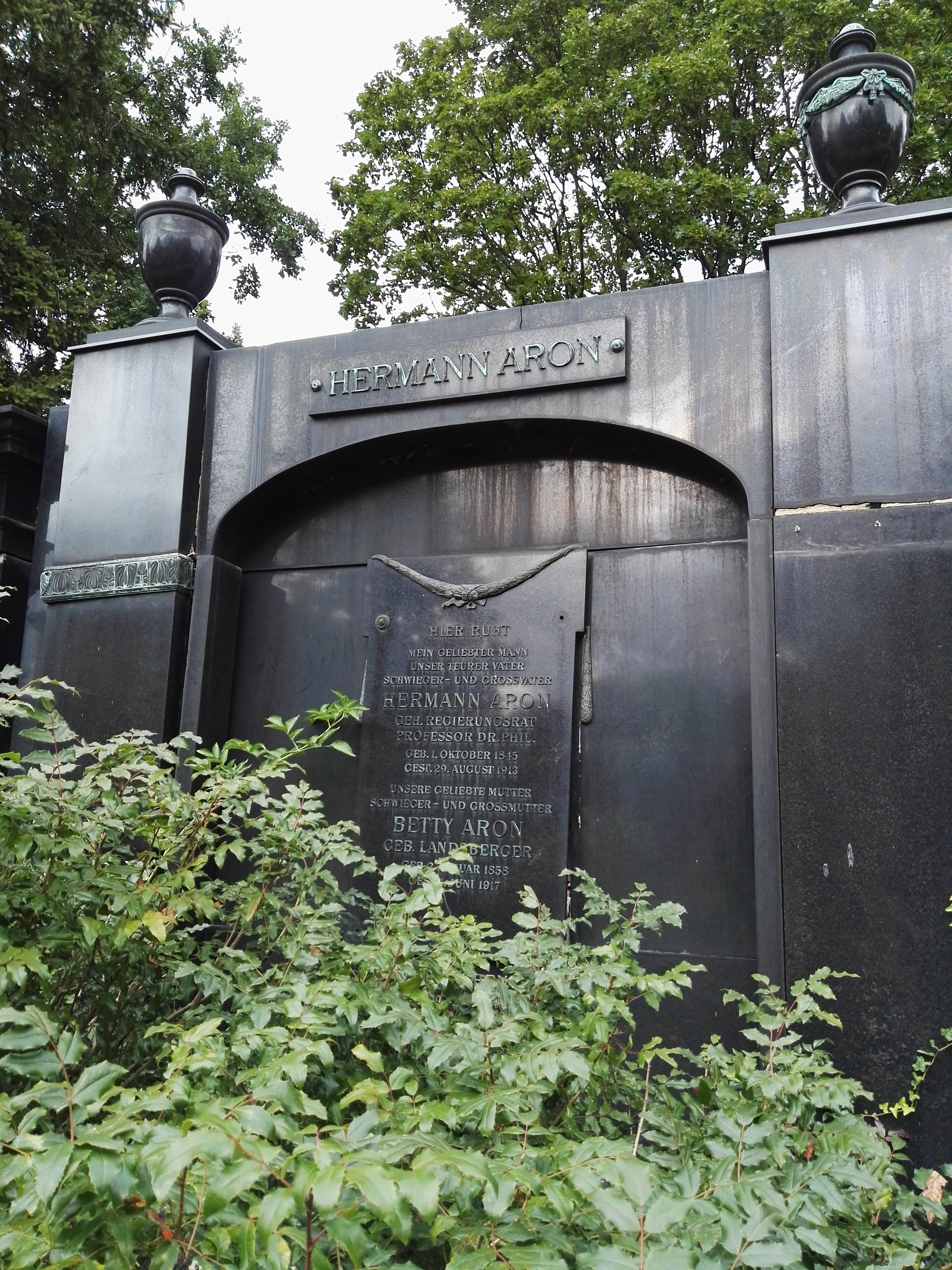
Hermann Aron's grave in Weissensee (Berlin)

Hermann Aron ([a:ron]; 1 October 1845 – 29 August 1913) was a German researcher of electrical engineering.

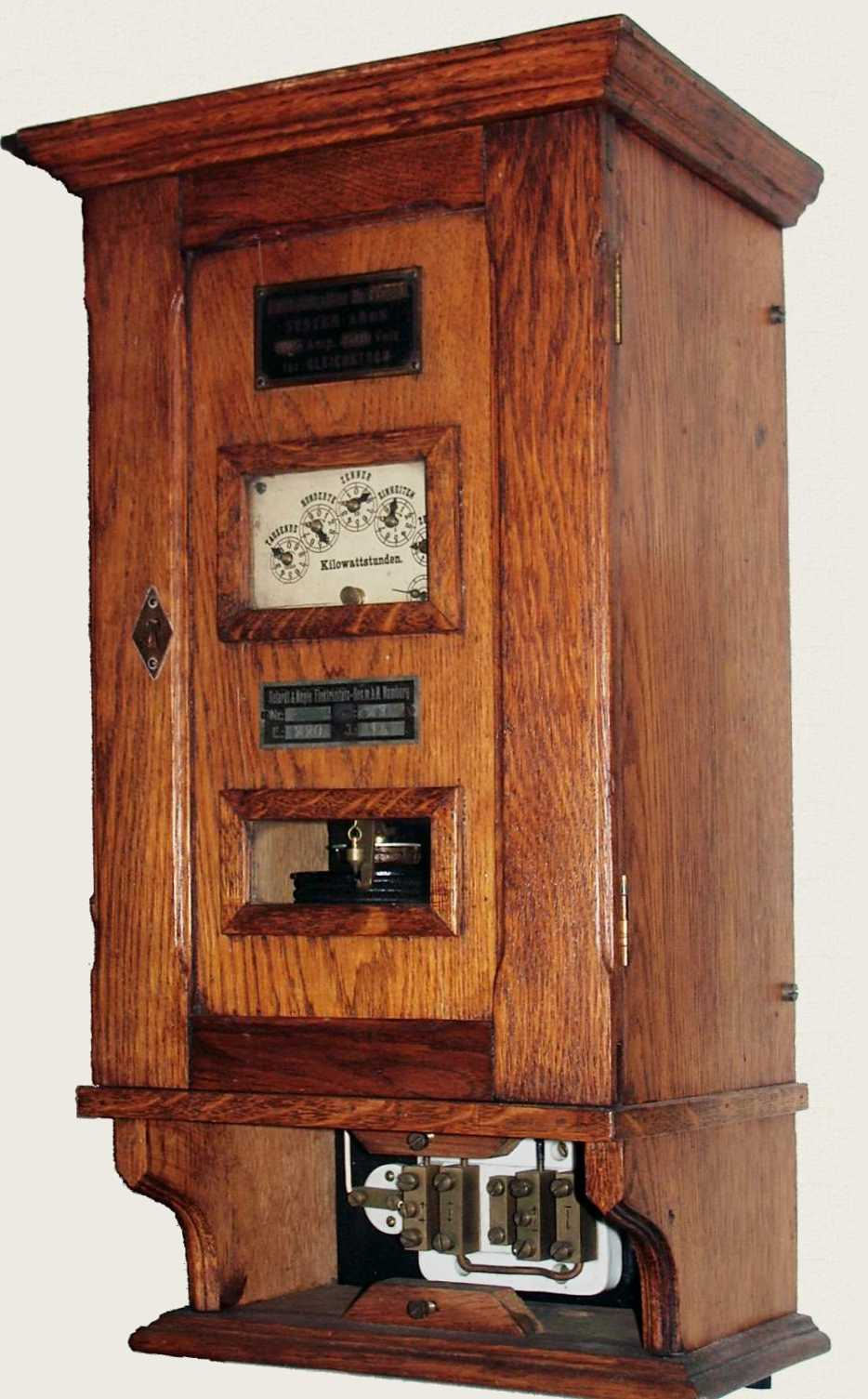
Specimen of Aron's pendulum meter

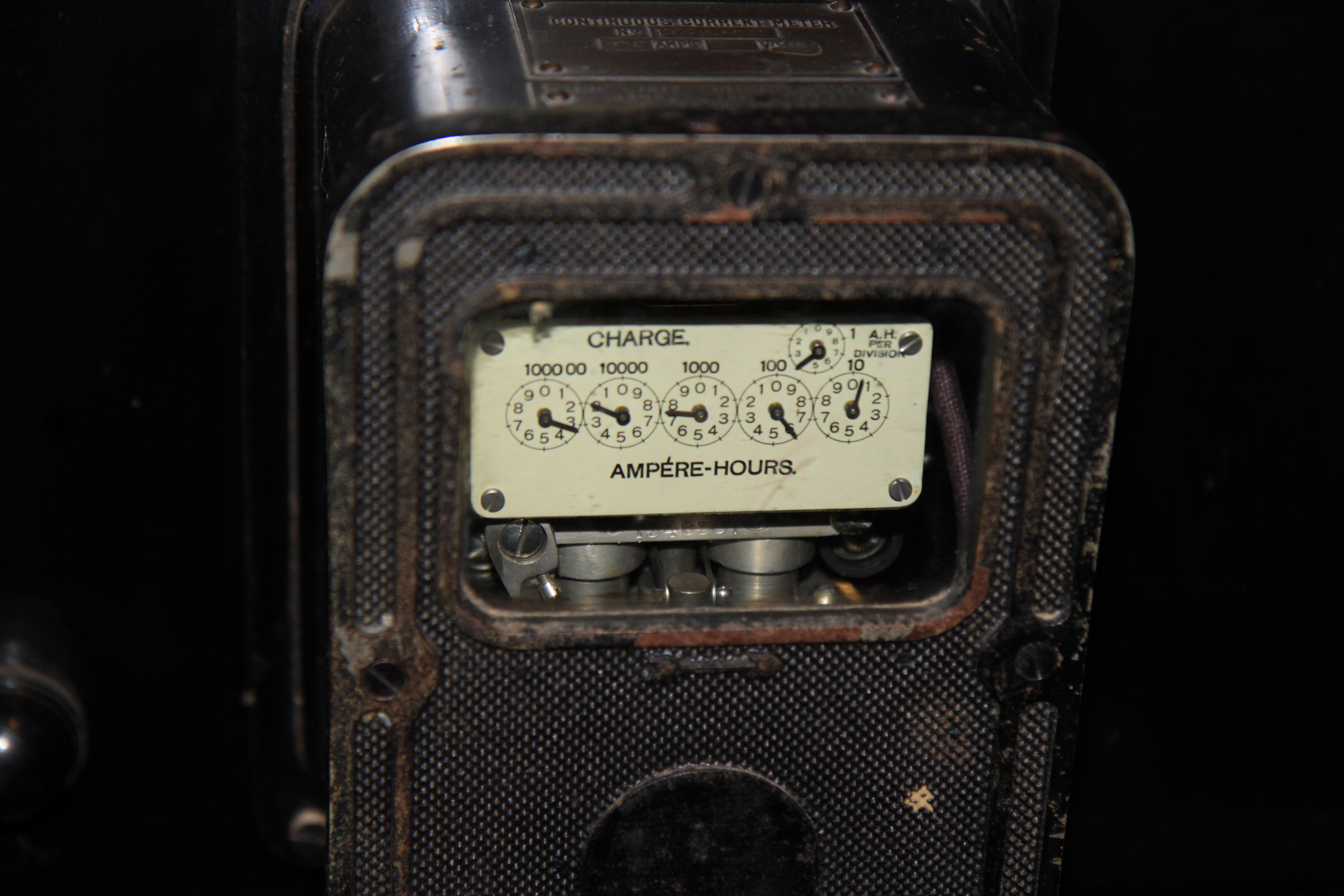
Late model of Aron's power meter

== Background ==
Aron was born in Kempen (Kępno), in modern-day Poland, at the time a shtetl in the Province of Posen. His father was a chazzan and merchant. The family wanted him to train as a Jewish scholar or scrivener, however wealthy relatives made it possible for him to attend from 1862 the high school at Kölln, Berlin and after graduating in 1867, to study at the University of Berlin. Aron began by studying medicine, but changed in the 3rd term to mathematics and natural sciences. From 1870 he studied at the University of Heidelberg, with such notable physics lecturers as Helmholtz and Kirchhoff. He obtained his doctorate from Berlin in 1873 and became an assistant at the physical laboratory of the trade academy (Gewerbeakademie). He taught at the University of Berlin where he became professor of physics, and at the Prussian Army's school for artillery and engineers.

He is buried in Weißensee Cemetery, Berlin.

== Electricity meters ==
In 1883 he patented the "Pendelzähler" - the first accurate watt-hour meter. The meter contained two pendulum clocks, with coils around their pendulum bobs. One was accelerated and the other slowed in proportion to the current used. A differential gear mechanism measured the difference in speed between the two clocks and counted this on a series of dials. The first meters used clockwork clocks that required manual winding monthly. Later models were self-winding by electricity. This meter was introduced into Great Britain by Hugo Hirst, and made and sold by his General Electric Company from 1888.

He also invented another Wattmeter, the eponymous 'Aronschaltung' . This is a circuit for measuring total power in three-phase AC circuits, whilst requiring only two direct measurements of power.

These inventions expanded into a business with factories in Paris (1890), London (1893), Vienna (1897) and Schweidnitz, Silesia. By the time of his death in 1913, it employed over 1,000 people.

== Nora radio ==
His son continued the business of H. Aron, watthour meter factory GmbH, changing its name in 1929 to Aron electricity company ltd., Berlin Charlottenburg. The company had diversified into the new market for radios, sold under the name "Nora". This was "Aron" spelled backwards: in the increasing atmosphere of antisemitism, it was prudent to avoid using a name that was so obviously Jewish. In 1933 the company was renamed again, to the fashionably Modernist and anonymous "Heliowatt". At this time Nora had around 3,000 employees and a market share of around 8%, making them the fourth-largest manufacturer after Telefunken, SABA and Mende.

Antisemitism continued to grow in Germany, and in 1935 the family sold the business to Siemens-Schuckert and fled to the USA.

The Charlottenburg factory was bombed in 1943, but the Nora brand continued after the war. After a series of advertisements promising their imminent return, they returned to manufacturing in 1947.

Heliowattwerke GmbH finally closed in 1996.
