= Nahum Gergel =

Jewish politician (1887–1931)

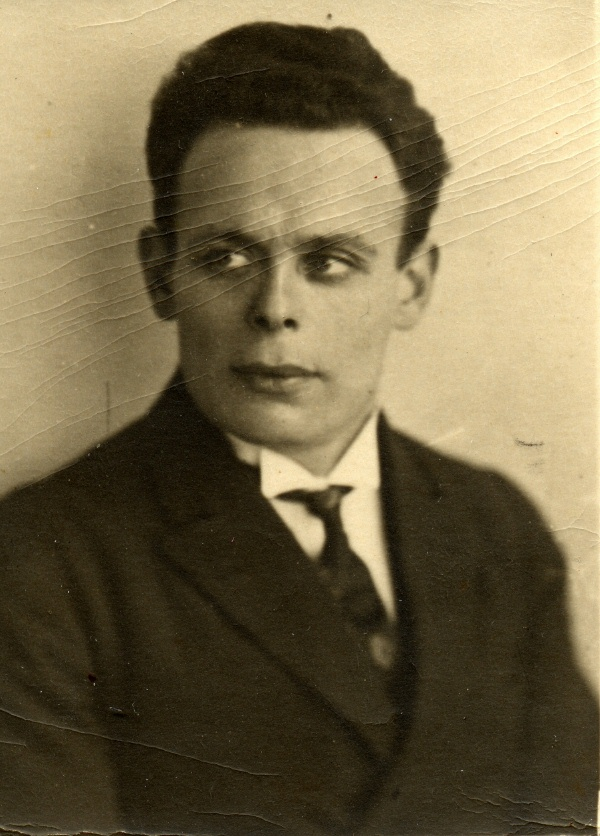
- Nahum Gergel, 1929, Berlin
- Born: April 4, 1887; Rakhmestrovka, Kiev Governorate, Russia
- Died: November 18, 1931 (aged 44); Berlin, Germany

Nahum Gergel (April 4, 1887 – November 18, 1931) was a Jewish rights activist, humanitarian, sociologist, and author in Yiddish. Nahum Gergel is best known for his thorough statistical studies of anti-Jewish atrocities (pogroms) that took place in Ukraine in 1918–1921.

Gergel received a traditional Jewish education, then studied law in Kiev. In 1914, he graduated from Kiev University and moved to St. Petersburg where he became active politically, as a Jewish rights activist and as a humanitarian. He lived in Russia, Ukraine, and eventually Germany, where he emigrated in 1921. Gergel died at the age of 44 of a sudden heart attack, and was buried in the Weißensee cemetery in Berlin in 1931. His family then moved back to Ukraine prior to Hitler’s ascent to power.

== Jewish aid organizations ==
In January 1915 Gergel joined the EKOPO (Jewish Committee for the Aid of War Victims), and in September 1915 he was elected its chairman. Starting September 1916 Gergel worked in the EKOPO Central Committee in Petrograd. In May 1918 he was elected President of EKOPO, and remained its leader till 1921, when he left Russia for Germany.

During this period Gergel also worked in the governing board of ORT (Obshchestvo Ruchnogo Truda - Society for the Manual Labor - a well-known Jewish international philanthropy and education-promoting society). In July 1920 - 1921 he was elected Chairman of IDGESKOM (Jewish People's Relief Committee). During World War I Gergel formed a group of activists that fought against accusations of Jews being German spies. He organized resettlement to Poltava for thousands of Jewish families that were deported by the Russian Government from the near-front Kurland and Kovno regions.

== Political parties ==
In his youth Gergel participated in The Bund, later he joined the Zionist Socialist Workers Party (ZSWP) and was elected to its Central Committee. After the February 1917 Revolution in Russia, Gergel was elected a ZSWP’s representative in the Petrograd Soviet of the Workers’ and Soldiers’ Deputies. After the union of ZSWP and JSWP (Jewish Socialist Workers Party), Gergel became a member of the new party Central Committee and soon was elected to that party’s All-Russia Committee.

== Jewish Ministry of Ukraine ==
In early 1918 Gergel was appointed chairman of the bureau of the Jewish Ministry of Ukraine. After the Hetman Skoropadskyi’s coup in April 1918, Gergel became effectively the head of the Jewish Ministry of Ukraine.

== Anti-Jewish Pogroms ==
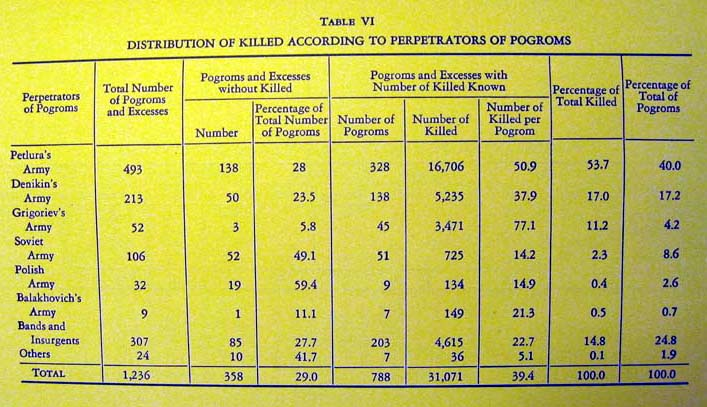
Page from N. Gergel's 1928 article (1951 English translation): Figures and statistics of victims and perpetrators of pogroms in Ukraine in 1918-21.

Severe anti-Jewish pogroms erupted in 1918–1921 in Ukraine; in this period Gergel was an active member of the Pogrom Victims Aid Committee. At the same time he worked as a chief of the Pogrom Relief Department in the People’s Security Commissariat. In December 1919, Gergel was appointed representative of the Red Cross’ Pogrom Aid Committee where he worked until the Soviet Government liquidated the Committee in May 1920. At the same time as he was working in different pogrom aid organizations, Gergel tirelessly collected materials and statistical data on anti-Jewish pogroms. Results of this work were later published in Europe.

Gergel’s study of pogroms is very often quoted as the proof that the Ukrainian National Republic army, led by Symon Petliura, incited and took part in pogroms. Aleksandr Solzhenitsyn in the early text of his book “Two Hundred Years Together” says that "According to Nahum Gergel's 1951 study of the pogroms in Ukraine, out of an estimated 887 mass pogroms, about 40% were perpetrated by the Ukrainian forces led by Symon Petliura". In the later editions of the book Solzhenitsyn replaces reference to Gergel by words "Jewish sources", so do some other authors who quote Gergel's figures and statistical analysis without mentioning his name - for example G. Kostyrchenko in his "Stalin's Secret Policy. Power And Antisemitism.". It’s worth noting that the study referred to by Solzhenitsyn was carried out by Gergel in 1918-early 1920-s, and was first published in 1928 in Berlin in Yiddish. Gergel's figures on the pogrom, which are generally considered conservative, are based on the testimony of witnesses and newspaper reports collected by the Mizrakh-Yiddish Historische Archiv (Mizrahi Jewish Historical Archives), which was first based in Kiev, then Berlin and later New York. The English version of Gergel's article was published in 1951 in the YIVO Annual of Jewish Social Science titled "The Pogroms in the Ukraine in 1918-1921"

== Emigration to Germany: humanitarian activities ==
At the close of 1921 Gergel arrived in Berlin where he continued his diverse political and activist work. He started with forming the OZE (“Jewish Health Society”) Committee Abroad (together with Kreinin and other activists). In 1922 he was elected to the Committee Secretariat and assumed the role of editor of “OZE Bulletin”. At this time Gergel worked in Mizrakh-Yiddish Historische Archiv where he stored all materials on anti-Jewish pogroms he had collected. In 1923 Gergel was elected the Secretary General of ORT. In 1925 he visited the United States as an OZE delegate. In 1926 Gergel was appointed as the JDC (stands for “American Jewish Joint Distribution Committee”) expert on the Russian Jewish affairs. Gergel pioneered the inception of Di Algemeyne Entsiklopedye (1932–1966, the first comprehensive encyclopedia in the Yiddish language). This project was the reason for his next trip to the US.

== Work in YIVO–Institute for Jewish Studies ==
Gergel was one of the founders and an active member of Institute for the Jewish Studies (YIVO) in Berlin. At the YIVO conference in Vilna in October 1929 he was elected a member of the YIVO Governing Board. He worked as an economics-statistics section editor and contributed to the “YIVO Bleter” journal. Gergel's socio-economical study of Russian Jews in the early Soviet era was published in his book "On the Situation Of Jews In Russia" in Yiddish (Warsaw, 1929).

== Publications and Unpublished Work ==
Gergel collected more material than he was able to publish during his short life. His large monograph, “The Jewish Ministry under Getman” (“Das Judische Ministerium Unter Getman”), was never published.

- Book in Yiddish: Gergel, N. “Di Lage fun di Yidn in Rusland”, 259 p., Warsaw, 1929.
- Article in English: Gergel, N. “The Pogroms in the Ukraine In 1918–1921”, YIVO Annual of Jewish Social Science, New York, 1951, p. 237-252. (This is English translation of the article in Yiddish originally published in 1928 in Shriftn far Ekonomik un Statistik).
- Article in Yiddish: “Jews in the Communist Party and the Communist International” (“Shriftn far Economisch und Statistisch” 1928).
- Multiple articles in Yiddish in YIVO Bleter: (ex.: 1931, p. 62-70)
- Several important articles by Gergel were published in the New York paper “Zukunft” (“The Future”) in 1920s, and early 1930s.
