= Siedlnica =

- Village
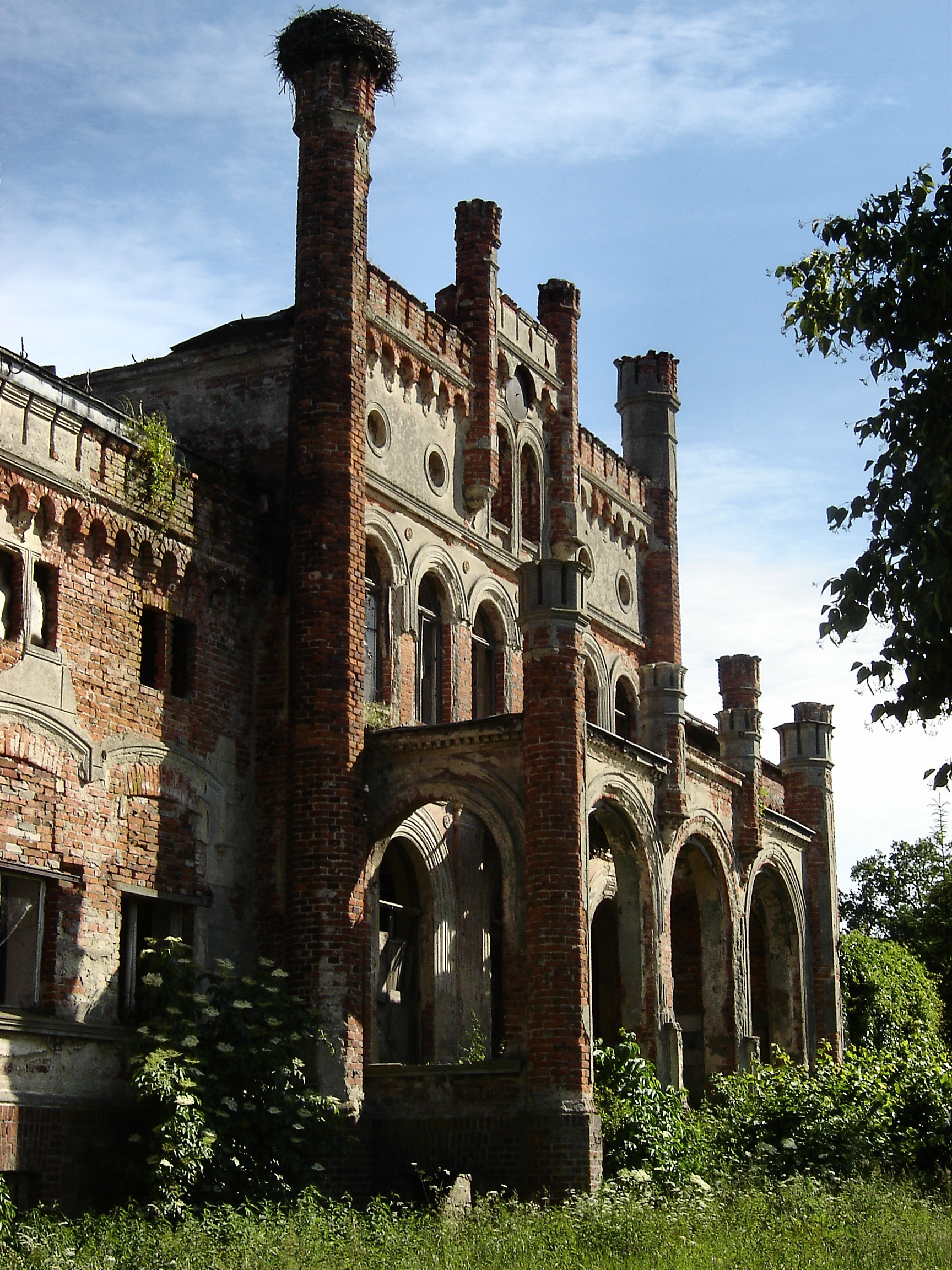
- Palace

- Location within Poland
- Coordinates: 51°46′N 16°20′E
- Country: Poland
- Voivodeship: Lubusz
- County: Wschowa
- Gmina: Wschowa
- Population: 882

Siedlnica [ɕɛdlˈnit͡sa] (German: Zedlitz) is a village in the administrative district of Gmina Wschowa, within Wschowa County, Lubusz Voivodeship, in western Poland.

The village has a population of 882.

The village has several attractions for tourists (coming mainly from Germany), such as the Church of the Nativity of St. Mary and St. John the Evangelist, and two castles – one from the 17th century, the other from the 18th century.

The architect Hugo Licht (1841–1923) was born in Siedlnica (Nieder-Zedlitz).
