= Hoaxmap =

hoaxmap.org entries
Pile	Date
231	15 February 2016
264	24 February 2016
317	11 March 2016
330	31 March 2016
358	13 April 2016
372	2 May 2016
401	25 June 2016
428	6 October 2016
469	19 April 2017
484	15 August 2017
492	9. September 2018

Hoaxmap – News from the rumor mill – is a project created on the personal initiative of Karolin Schwarz, an ethnologist of African studies from Leipzig, Germany. Since February 8, 2016, the website hoaxmap.org is online, starting with a list of 177 hoaxes. In June 2016, 400 hoaxes were recorded with origin or reference point, including evidence of inaccuracy.

Most of the false reports and rumors consist of defamation against refugees caught up in the European migrant crisis. Schwarz receives subtle threats from the political right. Other people thanked her for clarification. The hoax usually is spread due to prejudices of those holding a simplistic view, dividing the world into good and evil, and with a lack of media literacy. News and broadcasts from Australia, USA, Arabia and Germany reported about the Hoaxmap project. In April 2016 Hoaxmap was nominated for Grimme Online Award.

Besides positive feedback, subtle threats were sent to Schwarz.

In 2018 local news reduced reporting about false information, following which Hoaxmap could not list such rumors as refuted.

The map has drawn on data from other aggregators such as Mimikama.
