= Hugo Licht =

German architect (1841–1923)

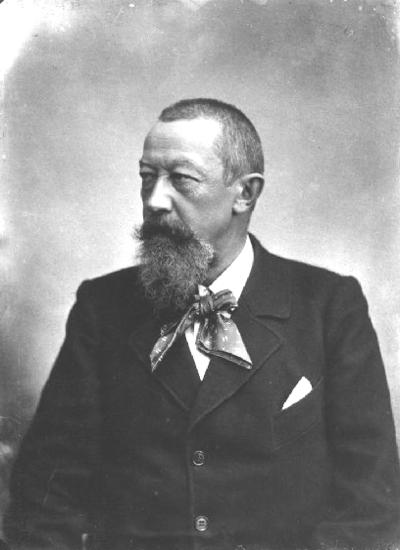
- Hugo Licht (ca. 1900); photo by Hermann Walter
- Born: 21 February 1841; Nieder-Zedlitz, Germany (today Siedlnica, Poland)
- Died: 28 February 1923 (aged 82); Leipzig, Germany
- Occupation: Architect

Hugo Georg Licht (21 February 1841 in Nieder-Zedlitz (today Siedlnica, Poland) – 28 February 1923 in Leipzig, Germany) was a German architect.

== Life ==
Licht was the son of the landholder Georg Hugo Licht. In the years 1862 and 1863 he was mason trainee at the renowned Berlin architects Wilhelm Böckmann and Hermann Ende. At this time, they embossed at that time the late Neoclassical architecture in Berlin – especially with private villas and other magnificent buildings.

In 1864, he enrolled at the Berlin Royal Prussian Academy of Architecture and was a pupil of Friedrich Adler. Later and with his recommendation Licht could change in the studio of the architect Richard Lucae in Berlin. In contrast to the orientation of Adler at the work of Karl Friedrich Schinkel, Lucae favored the formal language of the Italian Renaissance. Later he moved to Vienna and worked with the architect Heinrich von Ferstel.

From 1869 until the end of 1870 Licht traveled through Italy. This study tour took him through the whole country, but priorities were Rome and Pompeii. After returning to Germany, he married Clara Heckmann the same year. In the spring of the following year he established himself as a freelance architect in Berlin and worked as such until 1879. The plot of the land and the important buildings of the Jewish cemetery in Berlin-Weissensee were built after his plans in 1879/1880. During his time in Berlin, Licht made several study trips to Paris and London, where he also met with colleagues.

In 1879 Licht was entrusted with the leadership of the Building Surveyor of the city of Leipzig. He held this office until 1896 and was released by the office in October 1896 for the work on the Neues Rathaus (New Town Hall (Leipzig)). He held the function as a city planner until 1906.

Licht served from 1901 as editor of Die Architektur des XX. Jahrhunderts (The Architecture of the XX. Century) and from 1905 he was additional the editor of Der Profanbau (The Secular Building). Also in 1905 he became honorary doctorate (Dr.-Ing. E. h.) by the Technische Universität Dresden. In 1906 he was awarded with the title professor by the Universität Leipzig.

At the age of almost 82 years, Licht died on 28 February 1923 in Leipzig.

== Most important buildings and structures ==
- 1879/1880: blueprint for the Jewish cemetery in Berlin-Weissensee
- 1879: Südfriedhof (South cemetery) in Leipzig
- 1883–1886: modification and expansion of the Städtischen Museums in Leipzig (destroyed, area now used by the Gewandhaus)
- 1885–1887: University of Music and Theatre "Felix Mendelssohn Bartholdy" Leipzig in Leipzig
- 1886–1888: municipal butchery in Leipzig (area today used by the Mitteldeutscher Rundfunk)
- 1888–1891: municipal town hall in Leipzig (destroyed)
- 1894–1897: new building of the Johanniskirche in Leipzig (destroyed)
- 1893–1895: Old Grassi Museum in Leipzig (now Leipzig city library)
- 1896: Wooden observation tower in the Rosental park in Leipzig (destroyed)
- 1899–1905: Neues Rathaus (New Town Hall) in Leipzig
- 1908–1912: Stadthaus in Leipzig, (expansion of Neues Rathaus)
- 1911–1913: headquarters of the Leipziger Feuerversicherungs-AG in Leipzig (later regional headquarters of the Ministeriums für Staatssicherheit („Stasi“) of the GDR, since 1989/1990 museum Runde Ecke (Round Corner) about the former)
- 1913–1918: Zeppelin Bridge, Leipzig
- 1918: Löwenbrunnen in Leipzig
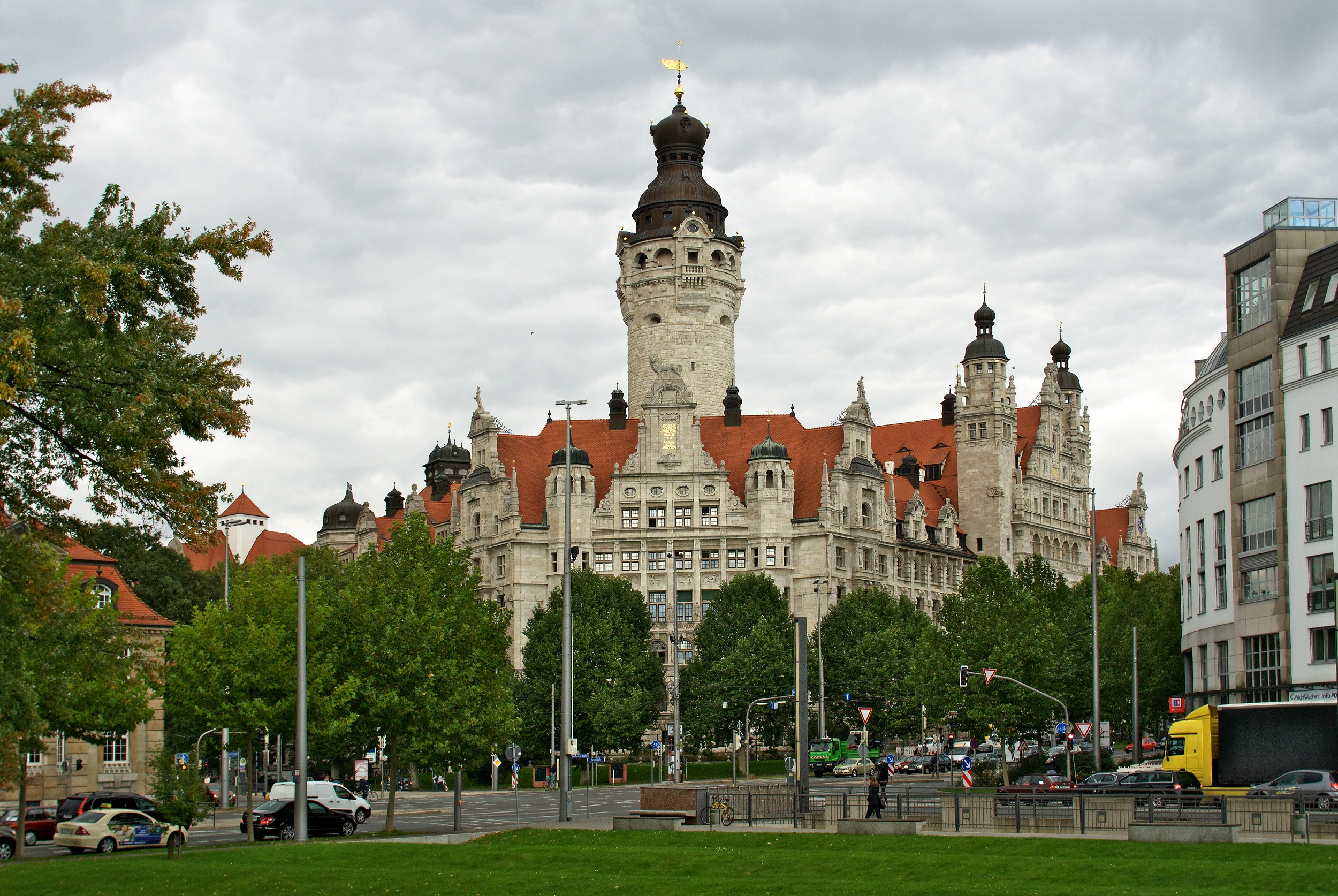
South-west view of Neues Rathaus (New Town Hall) Leipzig

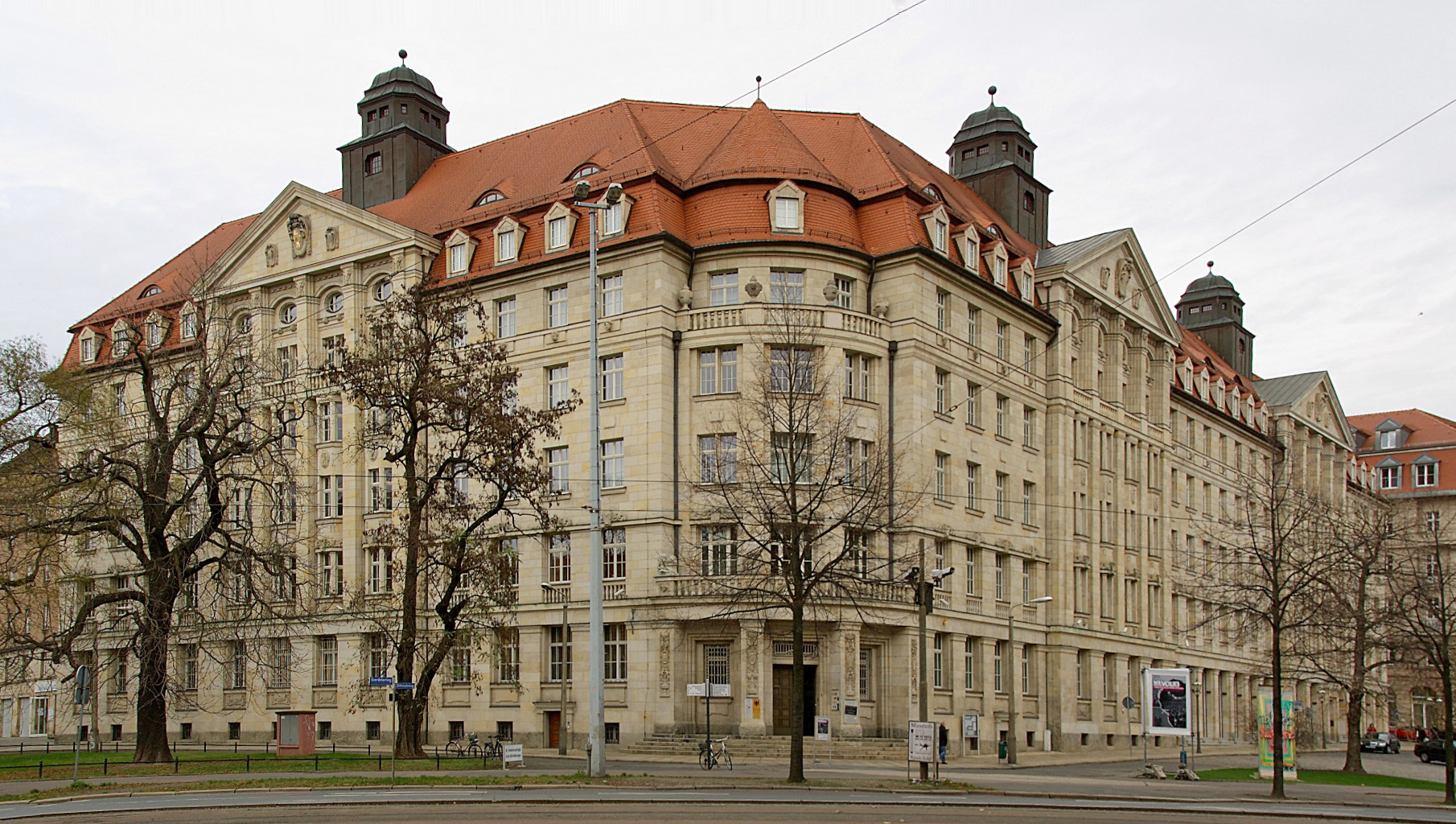
Museum Runde Ecke, former regional headquarters of the Stasi

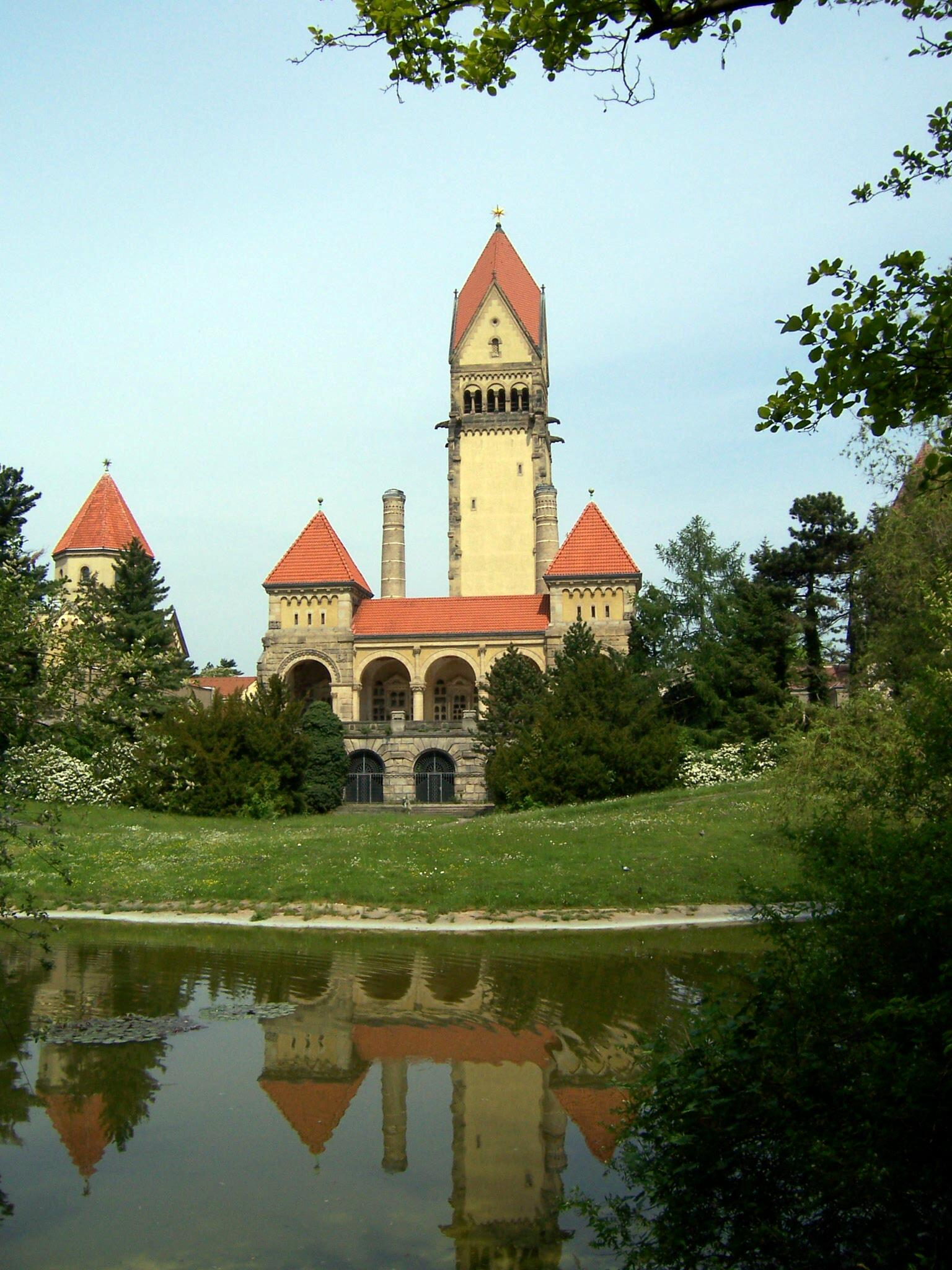
South side of the chapel complex on Südfriedhof (Leipzig)
