= Saint John's Church, Leipzig =

Saint John's Church
- German: Johanniskirche
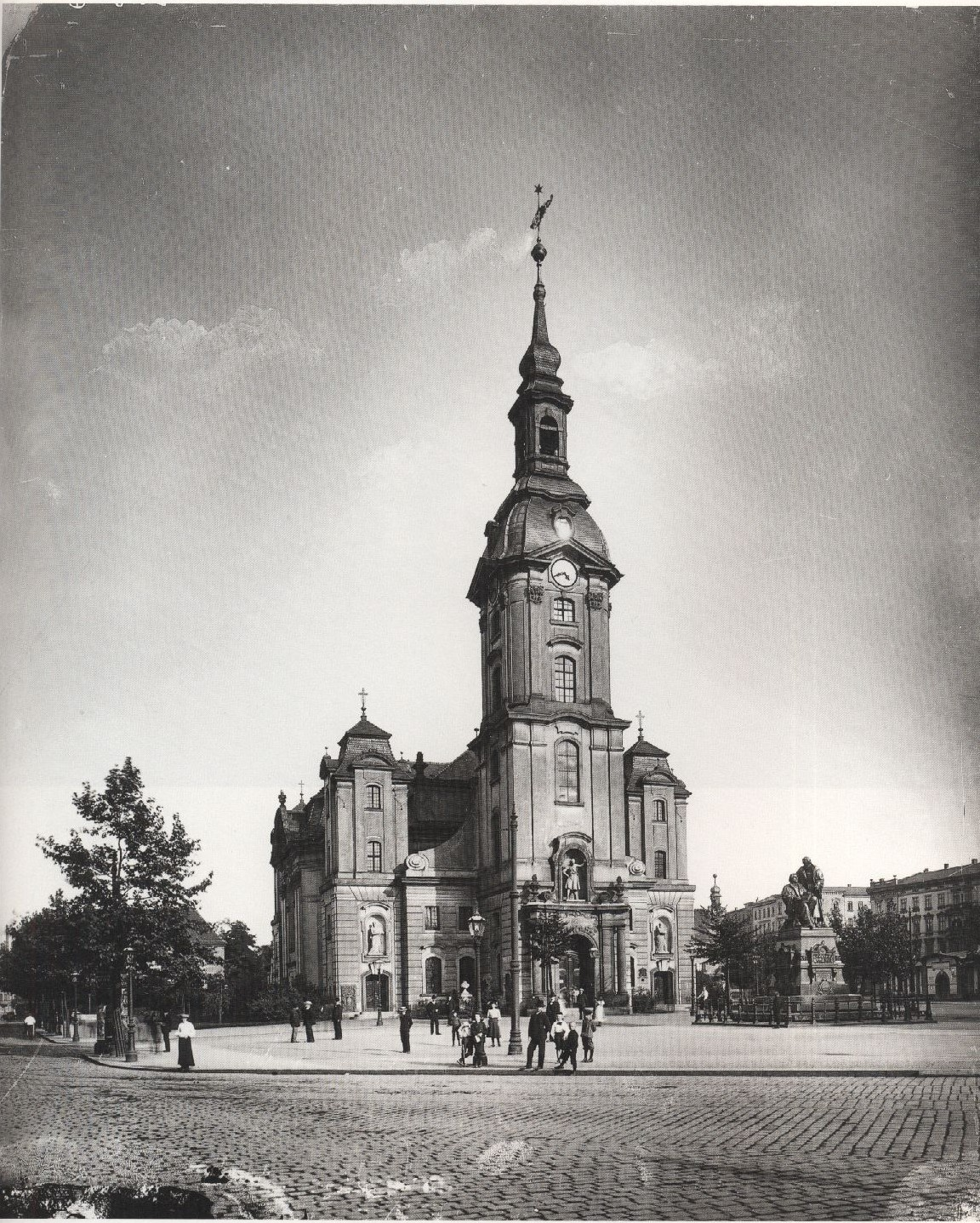
- Saint John's Church in Leipzig, around 1900
- Saint John's Church
- 51°20′16.02″N 12°23′11.19″E
- Address: Johannisplatz, 04103 Leipzig
- Country: Germany
- Previous denomination: Lutheran

History
- Status: Church (former)
- Dedication: John the Baptist
- Events: Leipzig bombings

Architecture
- Functional status: Demolished
- Architect(s): Tower: Georg Werner; Church: Hugo Licht
- Style: Tower: Baroque architecture; Church: Baroque Revival architecture
- Years built: Tower: 1746-1749; Church: 1894-1897
- Demolished: Church: 19 February 1949; Tower: 9 May 1963

St. John's Church (German: Johanniskirche) was a Lutheran church building in Leipzig on the Johannisplatz, several hundred meters east of Augustusplatz. During the Second World War, it was severely affected by the bombing of Leipzig. In 1949, the ruins of the nave were cleared, and in 1963, the tower was blown up.

== History ==
As a church, St. John's was built in the 14th century. In 1547 the building was partially destroyed in the Schmalkaldic War, then demolished and rebuilt in the years 1582-1584. The St. John's Church was only given a tower in the Baroque style in the years 1746-1749.

During and after the Battle of Nations in 1813, the church served as a military hospital. The entire church was demolished in the years 1894-1897 except for the tower and rebuilt in Neo-Baroque style according to a design by Hugo Licht. In 1904, the disinterred remains of the composer Johann Sebastian Bach, and the remains of the poet Christian Fürchtegott Gellert which were found during the demolition, were interred in sarcophagi in front of the altar area.

After the destruction of the church in the Second World War, the ruins of the nave were cleared on 19 February 1949. Despite restorations already carried out and objections from the population and churches, the Socialist Unity Party of Germany (SED) ordered the demolition of the tower in April 1963. The protests were unsuccessful and on 9 May 1963, the tower was also blown up. Bach's remains were reinterred in the St. Thomas Church, and the bones of Christian Fürchtegott Gellert were given a place in the Paulinerkirche. The ecclesiastical community of the St. John's Church was added to the St. Nicholas Church.

== Images ==
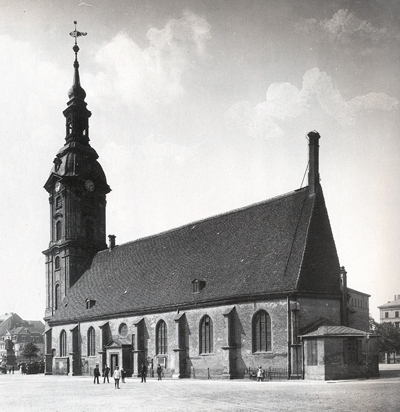
St. John's Church before 1894

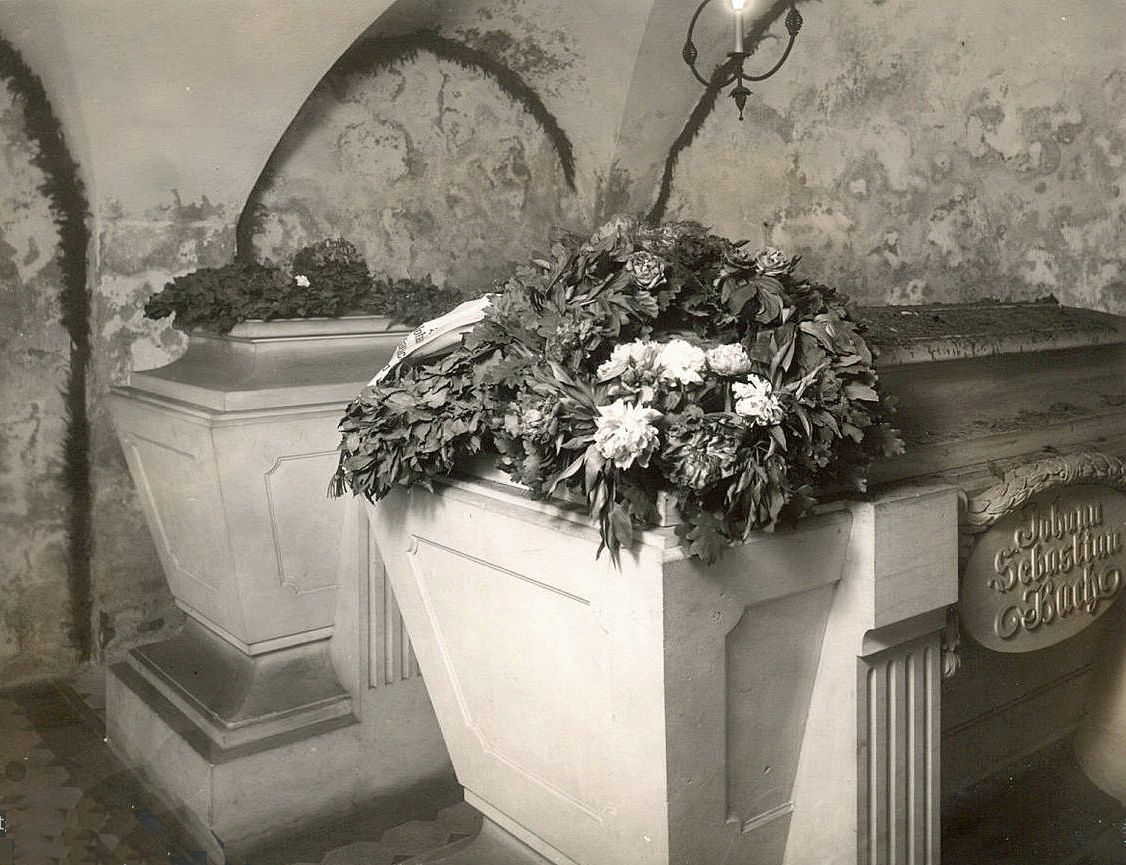
Bach-Gellert crypt (around 1930)

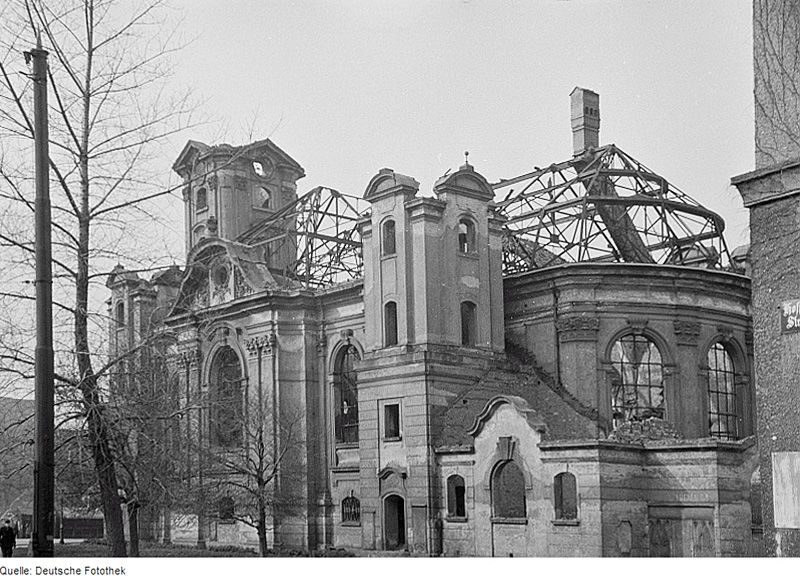
The destroyed church

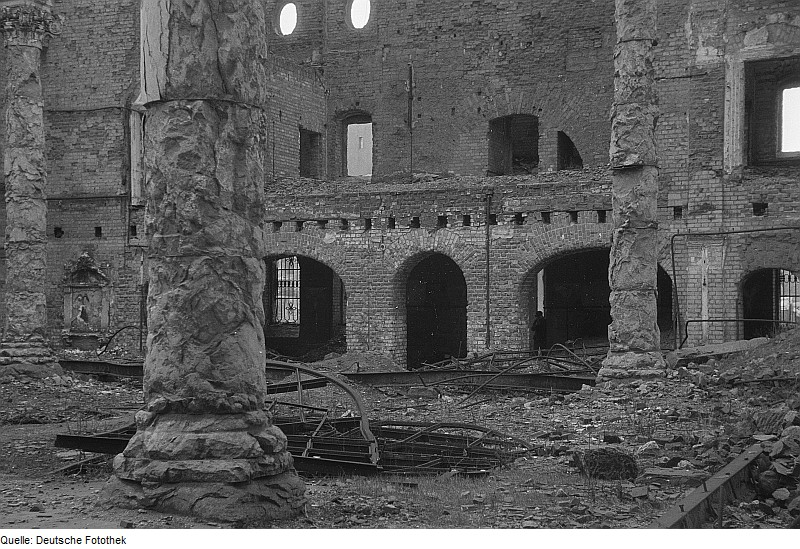
The interior

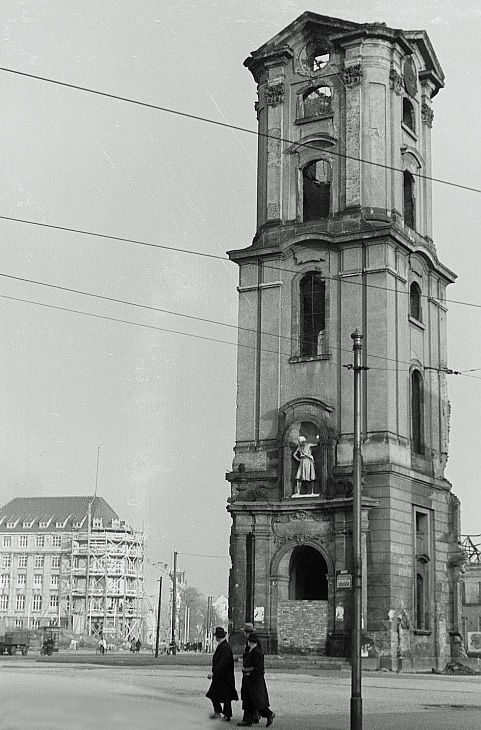
Tower ruin

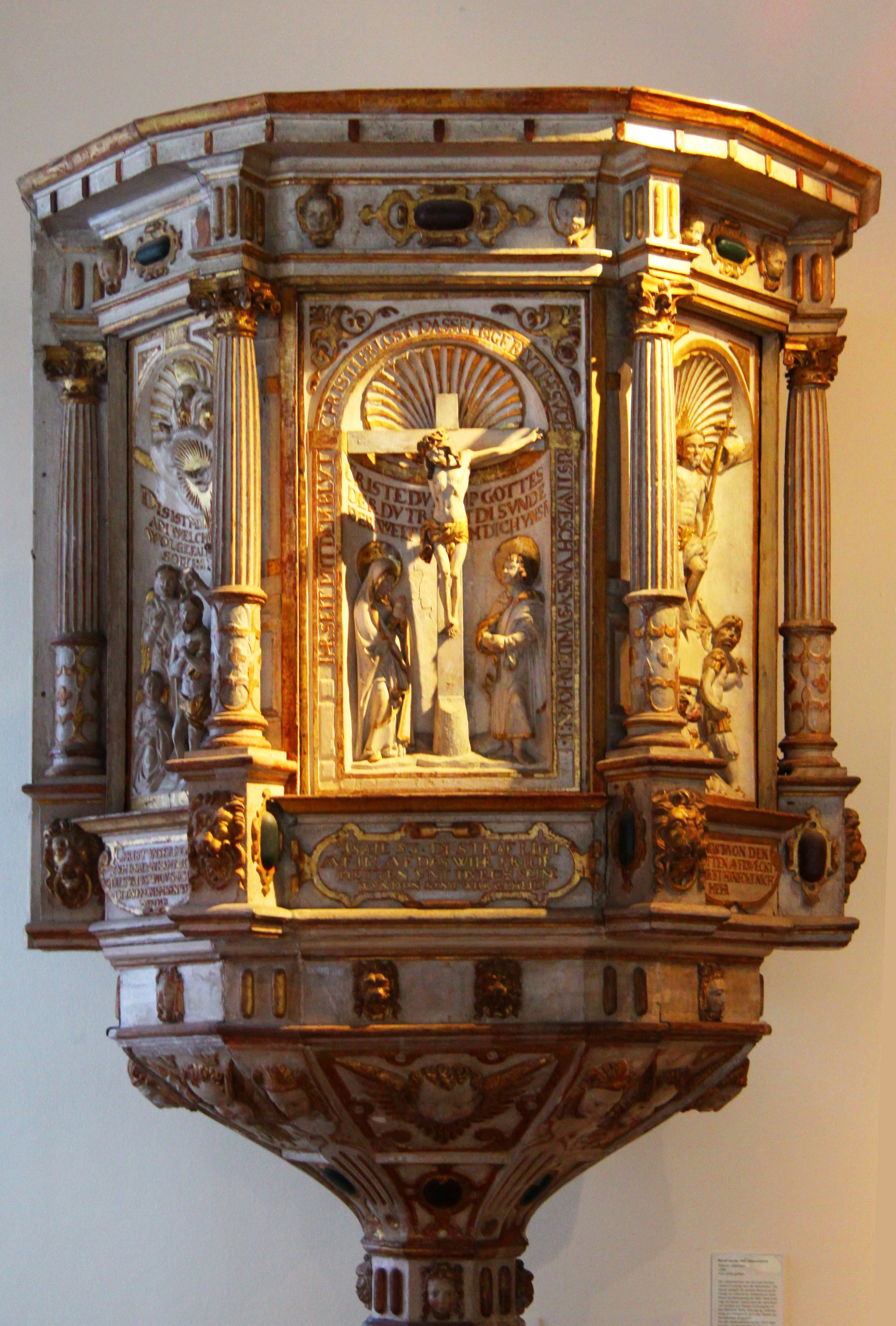
The pulpit of the former St. John's Church (now in the Leipzig City History Museum)
