= Mimikama =

Austrian fact checker website

- Available in: German
- Founded: 2011
- Website: www.mimikama.org

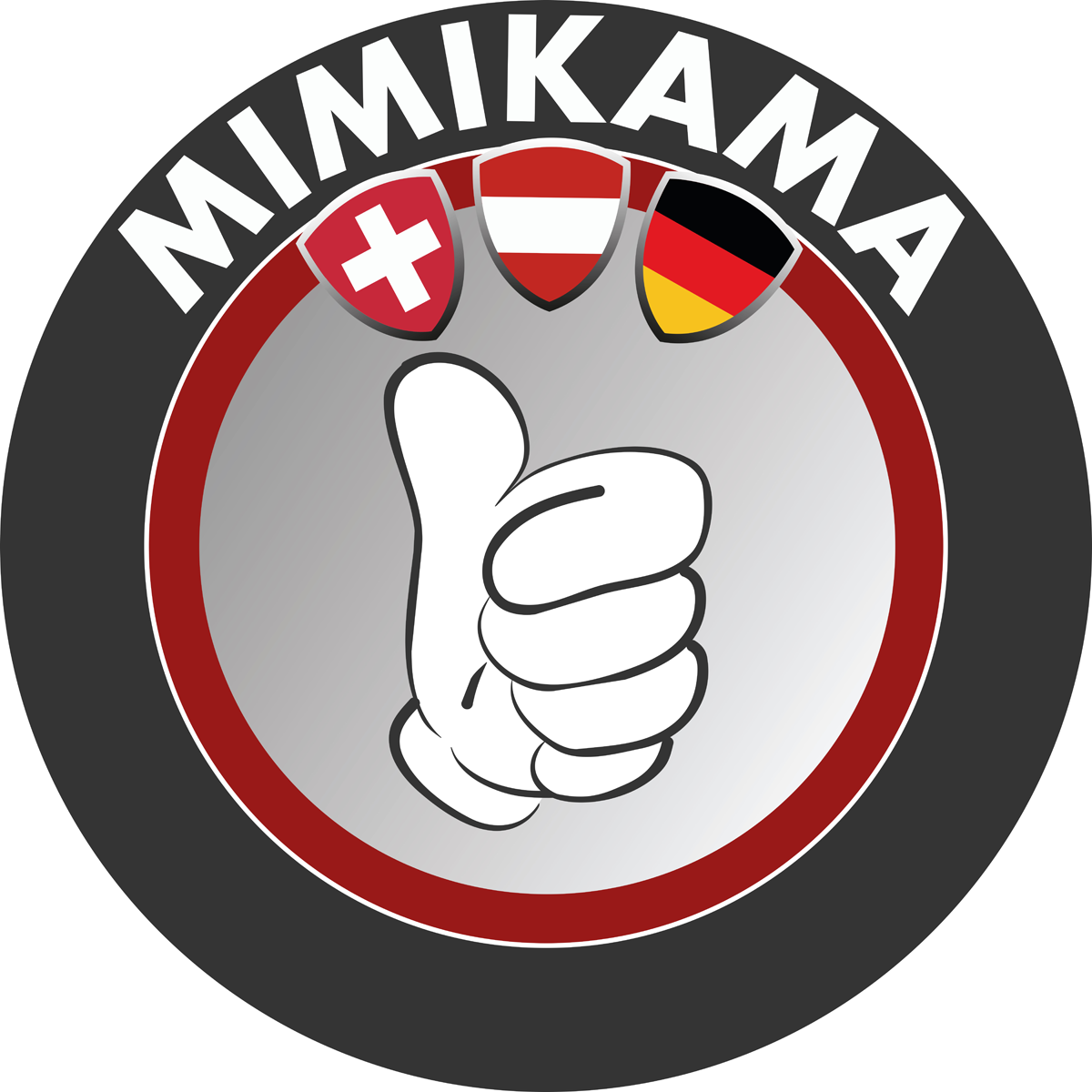
Logo of Mimikama

Mimikama is a fact-checking site based in Austria since 2011. It is published in the German language and is anti-abuse.

In 2017 they provided context for images of women with bruised faces, showing they were victims of domestic violence and not foreign migrants, as some were arguing.

The developers of Hoaxmap also relied on it in 2016.
