= Hans Aronson =

Hans Aronson (28 November 1865 – 8 March 1919) was a German pediatrician and bacteriologist. The Aronson Prize in microbiology and immunology was established by his will and has been awarded since 1921. Since 1970, the prize is awarded by the Senate of Berlin.

Aronson was born in Königsberg. He studied medicine in Königsberg and Berlin, and, as a student, he became an assistant of Paul Ehrlich. Aronson was mainly interested in microbiology and serology. He obtained his doctorate in 1886 with Paul Ehrlich as his doctoral advisor. He worked at the children's hospital in Berlin-Wedding from 1890 to 1891. In 1893, he became the first director of the newly established Department of Bacteriology at Schering AG. In this capacity, he developed one of the first successful commercially produced antitoxic antisera against diphtheria, based largely on the basic research of Emil von Behring, but in competition with Behring himself. In 1902, he developed a novel production method for antisera against streptococcus. He left Schering in 1909, but continued his research on diphtheria, diphtheria antisera, and on tuberculosis.

He died in Dresden and is interred at the Jewish Weißensee Cemetery in Berlin.
