= Hermann Dold =

German physician and bacteriologist

Hermann Dold (born 5 October 1882 in Stuttgart, died 31 October 1962 in Freiburg im Breisgau) was a German physician and bacteriologist.

== Biography ==
He studied medicine at the University of Tübingen and the University of Berlin, and earned his doctorate in medicine in 1906. From 1908, he served as demonstrator of bacteriology and comparative pathology at the Royal Institute of Public Health in London, before he was employed by the Imperial Health Office in Berlin in 1910. He earned his habilitation at the University of Strasbourg in 1912, and served as an adjunct professor there, before he became professor of medicine at the German Medical College for the Chinese in Shanghai. He undertook several research expeditions in China, Japan and Russia.

In 1919, he returned to Germany, and worked for a number of scientific institutions, before he was appointed associate professor at the University of Marburg in 1926. He became professor at the University of Kiel in 1928, at the University of Tübingen in 1934, and finally served as professor at the University of Freiburg from 1936 until his retirement in 1952. He also served as dean of the Faculty of Medicine.

Dold published works on tropical medicine, tuberculosis, syphilis and on antibacterial inhibitory substances and conversion. He was one of the editors of the influential journal Medical Microbiology and Immunology. He was a member of the Academy of Sciences Leopoldina.

== Selected publications ==
- Über die Wirkung des Äthylalkohols und verwandter Alkohole auf das isolierte Froschherz, Tübingen 1906
- Bakterienanaphylatoxin und seine Bedeutung für die Infektion, 1913
- Tuberkulose und Alkoholismus, Neutr. Guttempler-Verl., Heidelberg 1913
- Hygienisches Praktikum: Ein Taschenbuch f. Studierende, Arzte u. Kreisarztkandidaten, Urban & Schwarzenberg, Berlin/Vienna 1914 (with Paul Uhlenhuth), Allgäuer Druckerei u. Verl.-Anst., Kempten (Allg.) 1953
- Wie steht es um den deutschen Volkskörper?, Lipsius & Tischer, Kiel 1931
- Untersuchungen von Milch und Milchprodukten der Breisgau-Milchzentrale Freiburg auf Tuberkel-Bakterien mit negativem Ergebnis : Ein Beitr. zur Frage d. Zuverlässigkeit e. sorgfältigen Pasteurisierung (Kurzzeit-Verfahren), Allgäuer Druckerei u. Verl.-Anst., Kempten (Allg.) 1953 (with Gerhard Jordan)
