= Jacques Joseph =

German plastic surgeon (1865–1934)

- Born: Jakob Lewin Joseph; 6 September 1865; Königsberg, Prussia
- Died: 12 February 1934 (aged 68); Berlin

Jacques Joseph (born Jakob Lewin Joseph; 6 September 1865 – 12 February 1934) was a German medical doctor. "Nose Joseph" (Nasenjoseph) as he was known, is considered a pioneer of rhinoplasty.

Joseph was the third child of Rabbi Israel Joseph and his wife Sara. He was an innovator in modern plastic surgery and reconstructive surgery who developed methods for aesthetic plastic surgery, including cosmetic rhinoplasty. He noted that cosmetic surgery, while not a physical necessity, was worth the risks to a person's health because of its positive impact on their spirit, personality, and role in the world. He was a pioneer of rhinoplasty, which he developed and performed on many of Berlin's Jewish community (to which he also belonged).

From 1885 to 1889, he was a student of medicine at the Friedrich Wilhelm University in Berlin. In 1892 he joined the staff of the Berlin University Clinic for Orthopaedic Surgery. In the same year he married his wife, Leonore. In 1904, Jacques Joseph published his first report on the simultaneous, intranasal correction of a hump nose with the correction of the front nasal septum. In 1916, he was appointed head of the newly founded Department of Facial Plastic Surgery at the Ear, Nose and Throat Clinic at the Charité by the Prussian Ministry of Education and Cultural Affairs.

In 1919, he was appointed professor despite not having habilitated and was awarded the Iron Cross. In 1922, Joseph set up his own practice where he dedicated himself to work in several fields of plastic surgery. A report on Jacques Joseph was published by "raving reporter" Egon Erwin Kisch. In 1928 and 1929 the first two sections of Jacques Joseph's book on 'Nasal plastic surgery' were published at Curt Kabitzsch Publishers, Würzburg and Leipzig. In 1931 the expanded final version of his book on 'Nasal Plastic Surgery and Other Facial Reconstructive Procedures, With an Appendix on Reconstructive Breast Surgery and Some Other Procedures in the Area of External Plastic Surgery. An Atlas and Text Book.' was published. This book is called a milestone in plastic surgery.

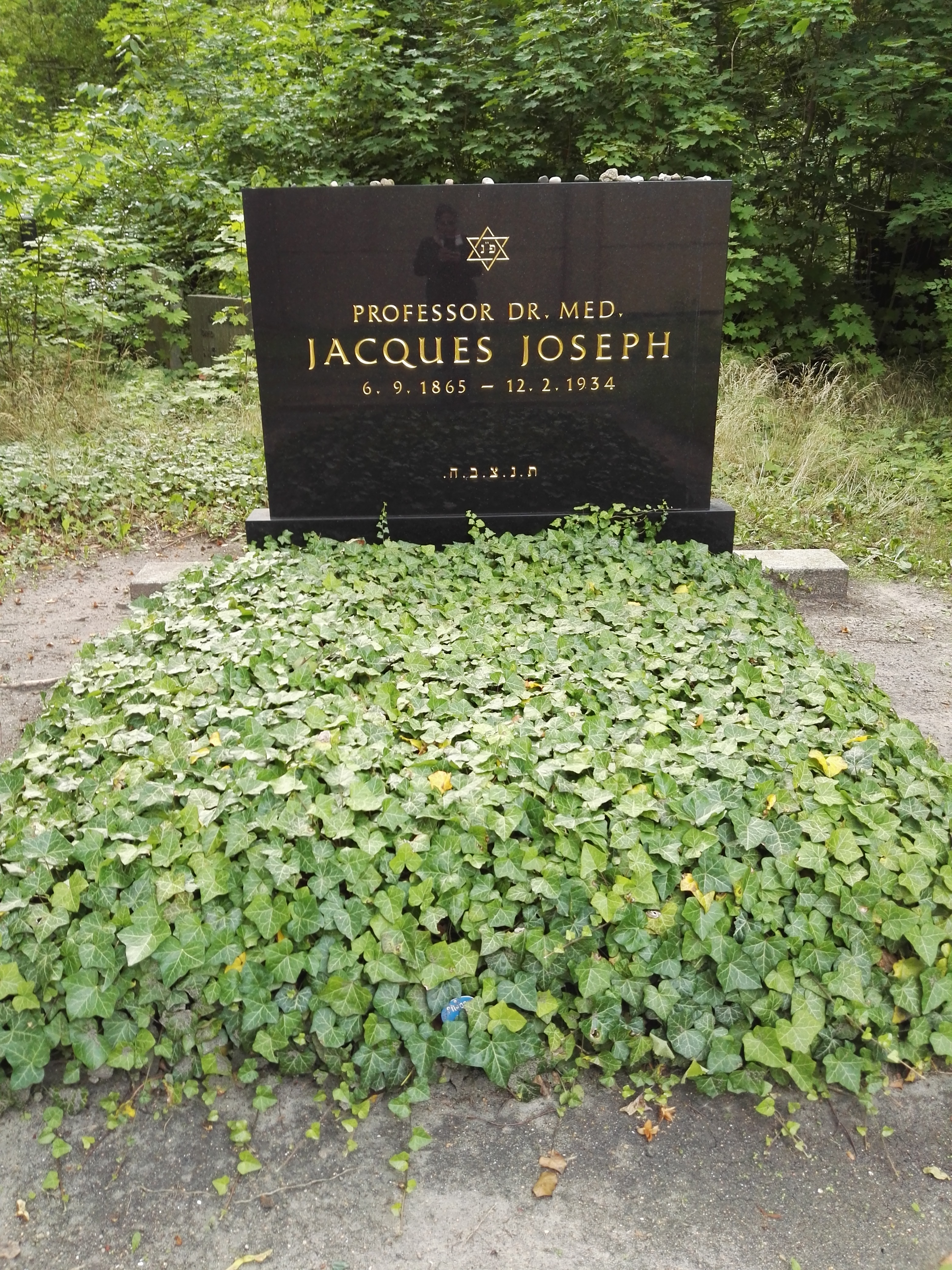
Jacques Joseph's grave

On 12 February 1934, Jacques Joseph died of a heart attack in the hallway of his house in Berlin on his way to his practice. Joseph's grave, long thought to be lost, was discovered in the early 2000s in the Jewish Weißensee cemetery. After reconstruction of the gravestone, it was rededicated by leading members of the Jewish community of Berlin on October 17, 2004.
