= Richard Otto (physician) =

German physician and bacteriologist

- Born: 9 November 1872; Zimmerhausen
- Died: 12 August 1952 (aged 79); Frankfurt am Main
- Occupations: Physician and microbiologist
- Employer: Paul Ehrlich Institute

Richard Ernst Wilhelm Otto (9 November 1872 – 12 August 1952) was a German physician and bacteriologist, who served as director of the Paul Ehrlich Institute until 1948.

== Career ==
Otto was born in Zimmerhausen. He obtained his doctorate in medicine in 1895 and served as a military physician at the Prussian Institute of Infectious Diseases in Berlin from 1902. He was promoted to captain in 1903. From 1904 to 1907 he worked at the Royal Institute for Experimental Therapy in Frankfurt. He was appointed as a professor in 1906 and became a battalion physician and director of the bacteriological laboratory of the Army Medical Service in Hanover in 1907. From 1908 he taught at the Technical University of Hanover. He was promoted to major and left active military service in 1913.

From 1913 he again worked at the Institute of Infectious Diseases. He was appointed Geheimer Medizinalrat (equivalent to Geheimrat, i.e. Privy Councillor) in 1918 and was promoted to Lieutenant-Colonel of the Reserve in 1920. In 1935 he returned to the Institute for Experimental Therapy. He became adjunct professor at the University of Berlin in 1935 and at the Goethe University Frankfurt in 1936. He was a member of the scientific council of the Army Medical Service from 1942.

From 1938 to 1948 he was the director of the Institute for Experimental Therapy, which was renamed the Paul Ehrlich Institute during his tenure. In the postwar era he was one of the editors of the textbook series Grenzgebiete der Medizin. He retired from his office as director of the Paul Ehrlich Institute in August 1948. He died in Frankfurt, aged 79.

== Honours ==
- Aronson Prize (1931)
- Fellow of the Academy of Sciences Leopoldina
