= Aronson Prize =

German medicine award

The Aronson Prize (German: Aronson-Preis) is a prize awarded for achievements in microbiology and immunology. It was established by the will of the German pediatrician and bacteriologist Hans Aronson and has been awarded since 1921. Aronson bequeathed a large part of his estate to the establishment of the prize. The prize is awarded biannually on 8 March, the date of Aronson's death.

In 1969, the foundation that awarded the prize was dissolved on the initiative of its last chairman Georg Henneberg, and the responsibility for the prize and the remaining capital was transferred to the (West) Berlin government, in order to safeguard the existence of the prize. Since 1970, the prize has been awarded by the Senate of Berlin.

The first laureate was August von Wassermann. Among the Aronson laureates are several scientists who later were awarded the Nobel Prize in Physiology or Medicine, such as Karl Landsteiner and Gerhard Domagk.

== Laureates ==
- 1921 August von Wassermann
- 1926 Karl Landsteiner
- 1931 Richard Otto
- 1944 Gerhard Domagk
- 1956 Helmut Ruska
- 1960 Paul Hans Karl Constantin Schmidt
- 1966 Peter Giesbrecht
- 1967 Albert Herrlich
- 1968 Friedrich Staib
- 1971 or 1972 Werner Köhler
- 1971 or 1972 Werner Schäfer
- 1973 Ernst Richard Habermann
- 1977 Werner Knapp
- 1981 Walter Doerfler
- 1982 Volker Schirrmacher
- 1985 Volker ter Meulen
- 1987 Karin Mölling
- 1988 Stefan H. E. Kaufmann
- 1989 Hans-Dieter Klenk
- 1990 Dieter Bitter-Suermann
- 1991 Bernhard Fleckenstein
- 1992 Stefan Carl Wilhelm Meuer
- 1993 Ulrich Koszinowski
- 1994 Thomas Hünig
- 1995 Otto Haller
- 1996 Thomas F. Meyer
- 1997 Bernhard Fleischer
- 1998 Jürgen Heesemann
- 1999 Ernst Theodor Rietschel
- 2000 Andreas Radbruch
- 2001 Sucharit Bhakdi
- 2002 Wolfgang Hammerschmidt
- 2007 Matthias Reddehase
- 2008 Matthias Frosch

== See also ==
- List of medicine awards
