= Federal Health Agency =

The Federal Health Agency (German: Bundesgesundheitsamt) was a federal government agency and the central research institution for public health in Germany. It was founded in 1876, named the Imperial Health Agency (German: Kaiserliches Gesundheitsamt). It was succeeded by the Reichsgesundheitsamt in 1918 and by the Bundesgesundheitsamt in 1952 (both meaning Federal Health Agency). The agency was dissolved in 1994, and its responsibilities transferred to three institutions, the Federal Institute for Drugs and Medical Devices, the Robert Koch Institute and the Federal Institute for Health Consumer Protection and Veterinary Medicine.
