= Responses to the COVID-19 pandemic in May 2020 =

Sequence of major events in a virus pandemic

This article documents the chronology of the response to the COVID-19 pandemic in May 2020, which originated in Wuhan, China in December 2019. Some developments may become known or fully understood only in retrospect. Reporting on this pandemic began in December 2019.

== Reactions and measures at the United Nations ==
=== 1 May ===
International experts on the COVID-19 Emergency Committee advised the World Health Organization to work to identify the animal origins of the virus causing the COVID-19 pandemic and its transmission to humans.

The UN Secretary-General warned that the COVID-19 fatality rate for people over 80-years-old was five times the global average, as he launched a new policy initiative tor challenges faced by the elderly as a result of "the biggest public health crisis to hit the world in a century".

UNICEF warned of 'vaccine bottlenecks' and requested urgent help to distribute vaccines worldwide amid dramatic shortages because of COVID-19 restrictions.

The International Civil Aviation Organization released figures warning of a potential overall reduction of 872 million international passengers to just over 1.3 billion in 2020.

=== 4 May ===
The World Health Organization welcomed a 7.4 billion Euro pledge by world leaders for COVID-19 treatments, while the UN Secretary-General warned that five times that amount would be required, urging the "most massive public health effort in history".

At a UNESCO-led event to mark World Press Freedom Day, the UN Secretary-General note that journalists are key to countering the "dangerous outbreak of misinformation" accompanying the COVID-19 pandemic, including harmful health advice, hate speech, wild conspiracy theories, and "blatant lies".

=== 5 May ===
The International Telecommunication Union outlined the implications of the pandemic, warning that it was essential to bridge the digital divide for the 3.6 billion off-line people, while internet traffic had tripled.

As COVID-19 restrictions worsened people's vulnerability, the World Food Programme warned well over 40 million people across West Africa faced desperate food shortages.

The UN Special Rapporteur on the Contemporary Forms of Slavery warned that the COVID-19 pandemic was worsening global slavery.

=== 6 May ===
The Director-General of the WHO reported that, since the start of April, an average of 80,000 cases of COVID-19 per day had been reported to the WHO.

The UN Secretary-General launched a new report showing that the COVID-19 pandemic was intensifying inequalities experienced by the world's one billion people with disabilities, calling for an inclusive recovery and response.

New analysis by the UN Office on Drugs and Crime suggested that coronavirus containment measures were placing victims of human trafficking at risk of further exploitation, including by organized crime networks.

=== 7 May ===
The updated UN Global Humanitarian Response Plan, backed by the WFP and other agencies, sought nearly $7 billion to protect the lives of millions of people and halt the transmission of COVID-19 in over 60 of the world's most fragile countries.

A new UN Office of Drugs and Crime report, on drug market trends during the coronavirus crisis, suggested that countries' coronavirus prevention measures had led to the widespread disruption of trafficking routes for illegal drugs, increasing some prices.

=== 8 May ===
Th UN High Commissioner for Human Rights Michelle Bachelet warned that some parties to the conflict in Syria, including ISIL terrorist fighters, may be using the COVID-19 pandemic as "an opportunity to regroup and inflict violence on the population".

The UN Secretary General made a global appeal calling for concerted global action to quash the "tsunami" of hate speech accompanying the COVID-19 pandemic.

UN ECOSOC warned that the COVID-19 outbreak could trigger a humanitarian catastrophe in Haiti.

The Director-General of the WHO stated that the lessons learned from the eradication of smallpox four decades previously could be applied to the coronavirus pandemic.

Dr Peter Embarek, Food Safety and Zoonosis Expert at WHO, confirmed that a now-closed Wuhan city wholesale market "played a role" in the outbreak, thought it was unclear if it was the original source.

=== 11 May ===
WHO Director-General Tedros Adhanom Ghebreyesus warned the resurgence of COVID-19 cases in South Korea, China and Germany followed the lifting of stay-at-home restrictions, indicating their complexity.

UN ECOSOC held a wide-ranging policy discussion "Joining Forces: Effective Policy Solutions for Covid-19 Response", stressing a range of multilateral solutions, while also committing to getting back on track for the Sustainable Development Goals.

Three senior UN officials in the Middle East, including from UNICEF and the UN Human Rights Office, jointly called for the release of Palestinian children from Israeli-run prisons and detentions centres, due to the risk of COVID-19 infection.

The head of UNAIDS warned that two decades of treatment gains were under threat due to the pandemic.

=== 12 May ===
UNICEF warned that as the coronavirus outbreak entered its fifth month, the health crisis was "quickly becoming a child rights crisis", requesting $1.6 billion to support its humanitarian response for children affected by the pandemic, as without it, an additional 6,000 under-fives could die daily.

The UN Secretary-General, in an online meeting with religious leaders via the UN Alliance of Civilizations, noted the coronavirus pandemic revealed "our common humanity", stressing the important role that religious leaders could play in limiting the damage caused by COVID-19.

=== 13 May ===
In its World Economic Situation and Prospect report update, the UN Department of Economic and Social Affairs (DESA) reported that as of mid-2020, the gross domestic product (GDP) in developed countries would plunge to -5.0 per cent, while the output of developing countries would shrink by 0.7 per cent, causing some $8.5 trillion in overall losses and eroding nearly four years of output gains.

The heads of the UN Office on Drugs and Crime, World Health Organization, the UN High Commissioner for Human Rights, and UNAIDS warned of the heightened vulnerability to COVID-19 of detainees, urging governments to take "all appropriate public health measures" to protect them.

A new UN report by UN ESCAP noted that the COVID-19 pandemic, due to shutdowns, could help improve the well-being of oceans in the Asia-Pacific region.

=== 14 May ===
UNAIDS initiated a petition from global leaders requesting that when a successful COVID-19 vaccine is developed, it be available free to all.

The UN Human Rights High Commissioner warned of potential risks as more countries moved to lift lockdowns to contain COVID-19 spread.

The UN Secretary-General launched the latest UN policy brief, 'COVID-19 And The Need for Action On Mental Health', urging the international community to do more to protect those facing increasing mental pressures.

=== 15 May ===
The UN refugee agency (UNHCR) reported the first COVID-19 cases in the Cox's Bazar Rohingya refugee camps.

The UN emergency humanitarian relief agency (OCHA) warned that evacuation centres in the Philippines set up as a response to Typhoon Vongfong were creating the ideal conditions for COVID-19 transmission.

The UN Office of the High Commissioner for Refugees warned that coronavirus lockdowns in Central America were being exploited by criminal gangs.

UNICEF in the Democratic Republic of the Congo warned coronavirus restrictions affecting vaccinations could result in a resurgence in deadly childhood diseases like "polio, chickenpox, measles, yellow fever, hepatitis B, diphtheria, tetanus, whooping cough and meningitis".

=== 18 May ===
Addressing the WHO-sponsored World Health Assembly, the UN Secretary-General warned that a "massive" multilateral effort was needed to tackle the COVID-19 pandemic, as WHO Director-General Tedros Adhanom Ghebreyesus insisted that "the majority of the world's population remains susceptible to this virus". On International Museum Day, UNESCO revealed that nearly 90 per cent of cultural institutions have had to close, while almost 13 per cent were seriously threatened with never reopening. UN Special Rapporteur on the Rights of Indigenous Peoples, José Francisco Cali Tzay, issued a statement expressing serious concern over the devastating impact of COVID-19 on Indigenous peoples beyond the simple health threat.

=== 19 May ===
The World Health Organization concluded the annual World Health Assembly, which adopted a resolution calling for an independent review of the global response to the COVID-19 pandemic, including the WHO's performance.

=== 20 May ===
At the launch of a UN briefing paper focusing on the impact of COVID-19 across Africa, the UN Secretary-General called for solidarity to preserve Africa's hard-won progress, while the UN High Commissioner for Human Rights and the Chairperson of the African Commission on Human and Peoples' Rights issued a joint call for urgent measures to reduce the ripple effects of COVID-19 on Africa's most vulnerable, warning that hoping it would go away would not work.

=== 21 May ===
The UN Secretary-General launched Verified, led by the UN's Department of Global Communications, to create a cadre of "digital first responders" to increase the volume and reach of trusted, accurate information on the COVID-19 crisis.

UNICEF warned that migrant children forcibly returned from the United States to Mexico and Central America were facing danger and discrimination worsened by the COVID-19 pandemic.

The World Health Organization (WHO) and UN refugee agency (UNHCR) signed a new pact, an update and expansion of a 1997 agreement, funded by the COVID-19 Solidarity Response Fund, to better protect approximately 70 million people affected by COVID-19 in low and middle-income countries with vulnerable health systems.

=== 22 May ===
The UN Office for the Coordination of Humanitarian Affairs warned that war-torn Yemen's health system had "in effect, collapsed" in the face of a widening COVID-19 outbreak.

On International Day for Biological Diversity, the UN Secretary-General called for the world to build back better and preserve biodiversity after the COVID-19 pandemic.

Director-General of the World Health Organization reiterated that the COVID-19 pandemic was disrupting access to routine immunization services worldwide, increasing the risk of potentially lethal diseases like diphtheria, measles and pneumonia.

=== 27 May ===
The ILO warned in a new report that more than one in six young people had stopped working since the beginning of the pandemic, creating a 'lockdown generation'.

The WHO Foundation, an independent body, was launched to help fund the WHO as "an integral part of the UN agency's resource mobilization strategy to broaden its donor base".

=== 28 May ===
The WFP released projections showing that approximately 14 million people in Latin America and the Caribbean could experience extreme food insecurity in 2020 due to the COVID-19 pandemic.

The UN Secretary General called for greater "unite and solidarity" at a high-level funding meeting as he warned of 60 million pushed into extreme poverty; coming famines of "historic proportions"; approximately 1.6 billion people unemployed; and a 'Great Depression'-like loss of $8.5 trillion in global output.

UN agencies and global partners announced they were seeking $2.41 billion to fight COVID-19 spread in Yemen and to support millions affected in the "world's worst humanitarian crisis".

=== 29 May ===
Thirty countries and multiple international partners signed up to support the WHO-backed COVID-19 Technology Access Pool (C-TAP), a "one-stop shop" for sharing data, intellectual property, and scientific knowledge to counter the disease.

== Reactions and measures in Africa ==
Map of the WHO's regional offices and their respective operating regions. Africa; HQ: Brazzaville, Republic of the Congo Western Pacific; HQ: Manila, Philippines Eastern Mediterranean; HQ: Cairo, Egypt South East Asia; HQ: New Delhi, India Europe; HQ: Copenhagen, Denmark Americas; HQ: Washington, D.C., US

=== 1 May ===
South Africa has begun to loosen its lockdown restrictions, allowing some businesses and factories to resume operations. Restaurants will be allowed to provide takeaway services. Recreational activities such as walking, cycling, and running will be allowed for three hours a day. The South African Government has maintained a ban on the sales of cigarettes and alcohol.

President of Zimbabwe Emmerson Mnangagwa has extended Zimbabwe's lockdown for two more weeks and announced a US$720 million stimulus for affected companies.

=== 3 May ===
Tanzanian President John Magufuli has criticized the quality of imported test kits, stating that the tests had returned positive on samples taken from a goat, sheep, and a pawpaw.

=== 4 May ===
The International Monetary Fund has disbursed Cameroon US$226 million to meet urgent balance of payment needs caused by the COVID-19 pandemic.

The Nigerian Government has announced that a 24-hour "stay at home" order that had been imposed since 30 March in the capital Abuja and the states of Lagos and Ogun will be lifted over a six-week period. This has include allowing businesses and transportation to resume with people wearing face masks.

In South Africa, Dondo Mogajane, the Director-General of the National Treasury, has warned that South African economy could contract by 12% and that one-third of the workforce could be affected by the coronavirus as a result of the economic fallout of the COVID-19 pandemic.

Zimbabwean Finance and Economic Development Minister Mthuli Ncube has appealed for the International Monetary Fund to clear its debt arrears in order to access foreign funding for COVID-19 relief efforts.

=== 5 May ===
The World Health Organization and the US Centers for Disease Control have urged people not to try untested remedies in response to Madagascan President Andry Rajoelina promoting an untested herbal remedy called COVID-Organics, which was produced from artemesia and other indigenous herbs by the Malagasy Institute of Applied Research.

=== 7 May ===
Dr John Nkengasong, the head of the Africa Centres for Disease Control and Prevention (Africa CDC) has rejected assertions by Tanzanian President John Magufuli that his country's COVID-19 tests are not reliable. The tests were supplied by the Africa CDC and the Jack Ma Foundation.

=== 8 May ===
President of South Africa Cyril Ramaphosa has announced that parole will be granted to 19,000 low-risk prisoners in response to a United Nations call for governments to reduce prison populations in order allow social distancing and self-isolation.

Tanzania has received its first shipment of the untested "COVID-Organics" herbal remedy from Madagascar. The World Health Organization has cautioned against using the untested remedy.

=== 9 May ===
President of Sierra Leone Julius Maada Bio has accused the opposition All People's Congress of inciting "terrorist violence" following a surge of violence linked to the country's coronavirus outbreak.

=== 13 May ===
President of South Africa Cyril Ramaphosa has said that his government will begin talks on moving most of the country from "alert level 4" to "alert level 3" by the end of May, although areas with the highest rates of infection would remain at "alert level 4".

=== 14 May ===
Investigators from the United Nations stated that they deeply regretted Burundi's expulsion of four World Health Organization officials supporting the country's responses to the pandemic.

=== 15 May ===
A study by the World Health Organization has found that coronavirus could potentially infect 231 million people in Africa by the end of 2020. Concerns were raised that the healthcare systems in many African nations could be quickly overrun if there were to be a sudden rise in infections.

=== 16 May ===
President of Kenya Uhuru Kenyatta has ordered the closure of the country's borders with Somalia and Tanzania for the next 30 days.

The Tanzanian government has lowered the country's 2020 economic growth projection due to the impact of the coronavirus, with Finance Minister Philip Mpango forecasting growth of 4% compared to an earlier projection of 6.9%.

President of Zimbabwe Emmerson Mnangagwa has extended the country's coronavirus lockdown, but announced that it would be reviewed every two weeks.

=== 17 May ===
Authorities in Sudan announced that all airports in the country will remain closed until 31 May.

== Reactions and measures in the Americas ==
=== 1 May ===
United States President Donald Trump noted about 63,000 have died in the US. He added that he would regard the virus' elimination and the reopening of the US economy as a victory.

The Director of the National Institute of Allergy and Infectious Diseases Dr Anthony Fauci has expressed optimism about Gilead Sciences' antiviral medication remdesivir after initial tests indicated it helped shorten recovery times. Later, the White House announced that Dr Fauci will not be allowed to testify at a Congressional inquiry into the Trump Administration's handling of the coronavirus pandemic.

Governor of New York Andrew Cuomo has announced that all schools and colleges in New York state will remain closed for the duration of the 2019–20 academic year.

Texas and Ohio have embarked with a gradual relaxation of lockdown restrictions on Friday. Georgia has allowed all businesses to reopen.

Several US airlines including Southwest Airlines, Alaska Airlines, United Airlines, Delta Air Lines, the American Airlines Group, and Frontier Airlines announce that all passengers will be required to wear face masks. Southwest Airlines has announced it will provide masks if patients forget to bring them.

=== 2 May ===
In Brazil, prisoners at Paraquequara Penitentiary in Manaus took seven guards hostage to allegedly protest the suspension of family visits, poor living conditions, sweltering heat and lack of electricity.

The United States Food and Drug Administration has authorized the use of Gilead Sciences's antiviral drug remdesivir for emergency use in hospitals. The company's CEO Daniel O'Day announced that the company was donating 1.5 million vials of the drug to help patients.

The National Aeronautic and Space Administration (NASA) and SpaceX have advised spectators to stay at home during the launch of two astronauts aboard a SpaceX rocket to the International Space Station on 27 May. This will be the first launch of astronauts from the Kennedy Space Center in Florida since 2011 and the first attempt by a private company to fly astronauts into space.

New York Governor Andrew Cuomo has rebuffed calls to reopen New York state's economy, calling them premature. While acknowledging that people were struggling with their jobs, Cuomo stated that more understanding of the coronavirus was needed before reopening the state's economy.

The International Monetary Fund has announced that it has approved a US$643 million economic relief loan for Ecuador in response to the coronavirus.

=== 3 May ===
Brazilian authorities have managed to restore order following an uprising at Puraquequara prison in Manaus, where seven guards were taken hostage by prisoners protesting poor living conditions. Ten guards and five prisoners suffered non-critical injuries during the uprising.

United States President Donald Trump has expressed confidence that there will be a coronavirus vaccine by the end of 2020 during a media interview. He also expressed hope that schools and universities will reopen in September.

United States Secretary of State Mike Pompeo has claimed that there is "enormous evidence" that COVID-19 originated in a laboratory in Wuhan.

Democratic US Speaker of the House of Representatives Nancy Pelosi and Republican Senate Majority Leader Mitch McConnell have declined an offer for quick COVID-19 tests from the Trump Administration, stating that these resources are needed at the frontline.

New York Governor Andrew Cuomo has thanked Qatar for sending critical supplies and aid to New York state.

In Oregon, hundreds have staged protests in the state capital Salem protesting against lockdown measures.

Swiss multinational health company Hoffman-La Roche has received approval from the US Food and Drug Administration to conduct its antibody test Elecsys Anti-SARS-CoV-2 on people. This antibody test will test whether people have been infected with the coronavirus and assess their immune system's response to the coronavirus.

=== 4 May ===
According to an Al Jazeera report, the Trump Administration is seeking to accelerate efforts to reduce production and supply chain dependence on China and is considering new tariffs.

The White House has rebuffed a New York Times report forecasting that the United States could experience 3,000 deaths per day by June 2020 as the United States economy reopens. The New York Times report had cited an internal White House document based on government modeling compiled by the Federal Emergency Management Agency, forecasting 200,000 cases per day by late May. The White House claimed that the document had not been presented to the Coronavirus Task Force or undergone inter-agency vetting.

Director of the Office of Trade and Manufacturing Policy Peter Navarro confirmed that the Trump Administration would be introducing an executive order requiring federal agencies to purchase US-made medical products.

New York Governor Andrew Cuomo announced that the state will be reopening its economy in stages, beginning with manufacturing and construction, without announcing dates.

Secretary-General of the United Nations António Guterres has called for any treatment for the coronavirus to be made available to anyone.

=== 5 May ===
Several Brazilian indigenous leaders including Joenia Wapichana have appealed to World Health Organization Director-General Tedros Adhanom for help in establishing an emergency fund to provide personal protective equipment to health workers in tribal reservations and villages.

United States President Donald Trump has announced that the US Government will release a report into the origins of the coronavirus in the near-future without specifying a date. Later, Trump announced that the White House Coronavirus Task Force would be winding down as the country shifted to reopening the US economy.

White House Coronavirus Task Force adviser Dr Anthony Fauci stated there was no scientific evidence that the coronavirus originated in a Chinese laboratory during an interview with National Geographic.

Former Director of the Biomedical Advanced Research and Development Authority Dr Rick Bright has filed a whistleblower complaint claiming that the Trump Administration had dismissed him after ignoring his initial warnings about the COVID-19 pandemic and his opposition to the use of the anti-malaria drug hydroxychloroquine to treat the coronavirus.

Researchers at the University of Washington's Institute for Health Metrics and Evaluation (IHME) have released a new coronavirus mortality model predicting that 135,000 Americans will die from COVID-19 by early August 2020 as a result of the relaxation of social distancing measures. An earlier model released in 29 April had predicted 72,400 deaths.

The US-based public relations company Edelman released its 2020 Edelman Trust Barometer, showing that 64% of respondents were aware of the rich–poor divide as a result of the COVID-19 pandemic; 67% felt that the less educated, poor and less resourced were disproportionately affected by the pandemic; 67% were worried about "biased and inaccurate" information being spread about the coronavirus; and that 67% believed that the government should prioritize saving lives over the economy. Only 33% of respondents globally thought it was more important to save jobs and the economy. Edelman surveyed more than 13,200 respondents in Canada, China, France, Germany, India, Japan, Mexico, Saudi Arabia, South Korea, the United Kingdom, and United States between April 15 and April 23.

=== 6 May ===
US President Donald Trump has denied earlier reports that the White House Coronavirus Task Force would be disbanded, stating that its work would continue "indefinitely". He confirmed that Dr Anthony Fauci and Task Force coordinator Deborah Birx will continue to serve on the Task Force.

United States Secretary of Agriculture Sonny Perdue has also announced that US meat processing plants would be fully operational within ten days.

United States Secretary of State Mike Pompeo issued a statement accusing China of covering up the initial outbreak in Wuhan and causing hundreds of thousands of deaths and a global economic malaise.

New York Governor Andrew Cuomo has criticized several US states for reopening their economies despite the rising number of infections.

Former Director of the US Centers for Disease Control Tom Frieden has advocated an expansion of testing in the United States, warning that the pandemic will be "long and difficult".

=== 7 May ===
Brazilian Health Minister Nelson Teich stated during a media conference that lockdowns were likely necessary. In addition, over 20 Brazilian government officials including spokesperson Otavio Rego Barros, communications chief Fabio Wajngarten and Secretary of Institutional Security Augusto Heleno have tested positive for COVID-19.

Canadian Prime Minister Justin Trudeau has announced that the federal government and ten provinces will be supplementing the pay of essential workers including those working in rest homes. Trudeau confirmed that the federal government will contribute C$4 billion, which accounted for 75% of the total cost.

El Salvador suspended public transportation for 15 days.

The Mexican Government has converted the former presidential residence Los Pinos into a temporary home for health workers battling COVID-19. 58 doctors and workers are staying at the facility, which can house 100 people.

United States President Donald Trump and Vice President Mike Pence have tested negative for the coronavirus after a US military serviceman who worked in the White House was infected with the coronavirus. Trump mentioned that Russian President Vladimir Putin accepted a shipment of ventilators from the United States.

United States federal judge Douglas P. Woodlock has overturned Governor of Massachusetts Charlie Baker's order designating gun shops "non-essential businesses," arguing that closing them down for the duration of the coronavirus pandemic violated the Second Amendment. As a result, gunshops in the state are allowed to reopen. New York state authorities have extended a moratorium on evictions for non-payment of rent by another 60 days until 20 August in order to combat the spread of COVID-19.

Washington state officials have advised people against holding "COVID-19 parties".

The Coordinating Body of Indigenous Peoples of the Amazon Basin has launched an Amazon Emergency Fund to raise funds to protect 3 million Amazon rainforest inhabitants from the effects of the coronavirus.

The International Monetary Fund has approved a total of US$18 billion in aid requests from 50 of its 189 members. IMF spokesperson Gerry Rice also confirmed that the IMF was processing requests for aid from over 50 countries including South Africa, Sri Lanka, and Zambia.

United Nations Under-Secretary-General for Humanitarian Affairs and Emergency Relief Coordinator Mark Lowcock has appealed for US$4.7 billion in funding to top up its US$2 billion fund to help developing countries combat COVID-19.

United States airliner Frontier Airlines has announced that it will begin testing the temperatures of all crew and passengers from 1 June, barring entry to anyone with a temperature over 100.4 degrees Fahrenheit (38 Celsius).

=== 8 May ===
In Mexico, some local authorities have order the closing of markets, pasty and flower shops for the duration of Mother's Day.

The White House confirmed that a member of Vice-president Mike Pence's staff has tested positive for the coronavirus. Pence also called for a resumption of religious services while speaking at a Presbyterian Church in Des Moines, Iowa. In addition, the White House spokesperson Kayleigh McEnany announced that White House Coronavirus Task Force coordinator Dr Deborah Birx would be advising the US Government on the distribution of Gilead Sciences' new remdesivir drug.

The United States Department of Labor has reported that the unemployment rate reached 14.7% in April, with an estimated 20.5 million jobs lost as a result of the COVID-19 pandemic. This figure exceeds the unemployment rate caused by the late 2000s Great Recession.

The United States Government has blocked a vote at the United Nations Security Council on a resolution relating to the COVID-19 pandemic due to its reference to the World Health Organization.

The US Food and Drug Administration has revoked US authorization for face masks produced by more than 60 manufacturers on the grounds that they failed to meet health and safety standards for health workers.

The Associated Press has reported that several US state governors have been "disregarding or creatively interpreting" White House safety guidelines for businesses.

Many of Facebook's employees will be allowed to work remotely until the end of 2020. Most of Facebook's offices are closed until 6 July.

Global tech giant Apple Inc. has announced that it will be reopening its retail stores in the United States from next week.

The United Food and Commercial Workers International Union (UFCW) has announced its opposition to the reopening of US meatpacking plants, citing concerns for worker safety.

Also in the United States, the annual Miss America pageant commemorating its centennial anniversary, originally scheduled for December and it was cancelled and including associated state pageants that were due to be held in the upcoming summer, marking the first time since 1934 to cancel the pageant.

=== 9 May ===
President of Argentina Alberto Fernandez has extended the capital Buenos Aires' quarantine until 24 May but has relaxed quarantine restrictions in other parts of the country. Buenos Aires has been under quarantine since 20 March.

Brazilian Minister of the Economy Paulo Guedes has called on the Supreme Federal Court to reverse state quarantine measures in order to prevent a shortage of basic commodities.

US President Donald Trump has announced that the US federal government will buy US$3 billion worth of agricultural goods from the agricultural sector including dairy, meat, and horticulture producers in order to combat unemployment and a drop in revenue caused by the COVID-19 pandemic.

Congressmen Eliot Engel, the Democratic chairman of the United States House Committee on Foreign Affairs, Michael McCaul, the House Committee's ranking Republican member, Senator Jim Risch, the Republican chairman of the United States Senate Committee on Foreign Relations, and Senator Bob Menendez, the Senate Committee's ranking Democratic member, have sent a joint letter to nearly 60 "like-minded" countries asking them to support Taiwan's participation in the World Health Organization. These countries have included Canada, Thailand, Japan, Germany, the United Kingdom, Saudi Arabia and Australia.

White House Deputy Press Secretary Hogan Gidley confirmed that a military official who worked in close proximity to President Donald Trump had tested positive for the coronavirus on Wednesday. He also confirmed that Trump and Vice President Mike Pence have tested negative for the coronavirus.

Former US President Barack Obama has criticized President Trump's handling of the COVID-19 pandemic in the United States and urged former Obama Administration staff members to support Democratic presidential nominee Joe Biden.

=== 10 May ===
The Brazilian National Congress has decreed three days of mourning to mark the 10,000 Brazilians who have died and called on Brazilians to follow health authorities' recommendations in order to reduce infection rates.

In the United States, several US officials including Robert Redfield, the Director of the Centers for Disease Control and Prevention (CDC), Stephen Hahn, the Director of the Food and Drug Administration, and Dr Anthony Fauci, the leader of the White House Coronavirus Task Force, have entered into self-isolation after coming in contact with an individual who tested positive for the coronavirus.

Governor of New York Andrew Cuomo has required nursing homes in New York to test staff twice a week for COVID-19.

Tesla CEO and tech entrepreneur Elon Musk has threatened to pull the company's electrical vehicle factory and headquarters out of California and sued the Alameda County's health department after health authorities stopped the factory from reopening. Musk has accused Alameda health authorities of overstepping both state and federal regulations.

The US airline trade group Airlines for America has endorsed allowing the Transportation Security Administration to conduct temperature checks on passengers for the duration of the coronavirus pandemic.

Panama announces the start of remote education via TV.

=== 12 May ===
Despite Brazil recording its highest daily death toll with 881 fatalities so far, President Jair Bolsonaro stated his intent to push for the reopening of non-essential businesses such as gyms and hair salons amidst strong resistance from state governors. Brazil has recorded over 12,400 coronavirus deaths, the sixth-highest total in the world.

In the United States, House Speaker Nancy Pelosi unveiled the Democrat Party's $3 trillion pandemic relief proposal, with aid for struggling states and another round of $1,200 direct payments to American families, as well as a $25 billion bailout to the Postal Service, and $3.6 billion to ensure election security. Republican Senators immediately rejected the proposal, determining it to be 'too large and far-reaching'.

US Republican Senators have proposed legislation enabling Donald Trump to apply sanctions to China if the country does not provide a 'full accounting' for the origins of the coronavirus. Senator Jim Inhofe stated that "The Chinese Communist Party must be held accountable for the detrimental role they played in this pandemic. Their outright deception of the origin and spread of the virus cost the world valuable time and lives as it began to spread".

Panama announces that local companies may only reopen if they have health committees.

=== 13 May ===
In Peru, President Martin Vizcarra stated that the coronavirus had 'peaked' in the country, whilst also confirming that Peru would move into the final stage of lockdown, two months after the first confirmed case in the country. Although the lockdown is due to end on 24 May, social distancing will still be enforced in public spaces.

In the United States, cab companies Uber and Lyft now require passengers to wear masks.

The American Federal Reserve Chair Jerome Powell warned of a recession resulting from the coronavirus pandemic and urged the White House and Congress to take preventative measures. Powell cautioned that business bankruptcies and unemployment for millions of Americans will remain a serious economic risk.

=== 14 May ===
Canada and the US are likely to extend a ban on non-essential travel across the border until 21 June, as revealed to Reuters by top Canadian and American officials. Canada is allegedly pushing for the measures to be extended for another month, with the restrictions due to end on 21 May.

The President of the New York Stock Exchange, Stacey Cunningham announced that the trading floor will partially open on 26 May.

The US Secretary of State Mike Pompeo has condemned attempts by "cyber actors and non-traditional collectors affiliated with China" to steal American data linked to the coronavirus. The Chinese embassy in Washington described the accusation as "lies". Donald Trump said in an interview with Fox Business Network that he was "very disappointed in China; they should never have let this happen."

The US Labor Department reports that nearly three million Americans applied for unemployment benefits the previous week. Roughly 36 million Americans filed for unemployment benefits in the first two months of the pandemic.

The Supreme Court of the US state of Wisconsin has repealed the stay-at-home order issued by Governor Tony Evers, ruling that his administration surpassed its authoritative powers when the order was extended for an additional month without consulting legislators. This ruling effectively reopened the state, lifting limits on social gatherings, allowing travel, and allowing businesses such as bars and restaurants to reopen. The news was applauded by President Donald Trump.

=== 15 May ===
Brazil's health minister Nelson Teich resigned. Teich gave no reason for his choice to resign, stating he had given it "his best".

The International Monetary Fund has approved a loan of $520 million to assist Jamaica with the country's handling of COVID-19. The Deputy Managing Director of the IMF, Tao Zhang said that "a sudden stop in tourism and falling remittances" were the primary causes of the need for emergency funds.

Panama's aviation authority extended its ban on international flights to 22 June.

The US Center for Disease Control has alerted doctors to a "multi-system inflammatory syndrome in children", with a current or recent exposure to COVID-19 listed as one of the leading causes.

- The City Of Toronto cancels all event permits and festivals until the end of August https://www.toronto.ca/news/city-of-toronto-extends-cancellation-of-permits-for-major-festivals-and-launches-recovery-program-for-events/

=== 16 May ===
Air Canada has announced plans to reduce the company's workforce by "50-60 per cent", or at least 20,000 employees, as a result of the decline in air travel during the coronavirus pandemic.

LATAM Airlines has announced it will reduce the company's workforce by 1,400 employees across Latin America, with executive director Roberto Alvo highlighting a large decrease in business during the pandemic as the primary reason for the decision.

US President Donald Trump has stated that his government may consider restoring some World Health Organization funds, after all US contributions were suspended on 14 April, potentially in a scenario whereby the US would pay 10% of its former contribution levels.

The United States House of Representatives passed a $3 trillion bill to reduce the economic and social impacts of the coronavirus on the US, although Donald Trump's Republican Party stated that the proposal would be "dead on arrival" in the Senate. The bill would provide $1 trillion for regional governments and further payments to families and the unemployed struggling with the crisis.

=== 22 May ===
US President Donald Trump designated churches, mosques and synagogues as "essential services" and called upon state governors to allow them to reopen, criticizing the decision by some state governors to allow liquor stores and abortion clinics to reopen but not churches. State and local officials have the authority to designate essential services and issue stay-at-home orders, however.

=== 23 May ===
US car rental company Hertz files for Chapter 11 bankruptcy protection as a result of the economic effects of the COVID-19 pandemic. The company had already laid off 10,000 employees and is facing US$14 billion in debts.

=== 24 May ===
US President Donald Trump has imposed a travel ban on non-US citizens coming from Brazil in response to the country's COVID-19 pandemic, which has recorded over 363,000 cases and nearly 23,000 deaths.

=== 29 May ===
A partial easing of the stay-at-home order in Illinois, except for Chicago, was scheduled to occur.

== Reactions and measures in Eastern Mediterranean ==
=== 1 May ===
The Special Inspector General for Afghanistan Reconstruction (SIGAR) has warned the United States Congress that Afghanistan is facing a health crisis as a result of the coronavirus pandemic due to its poor healthcare system, lack of food supplies, and the ongoing conflict.

Asad Qaiser, the Speaker of the National Assembly of Pakistan, tests positive for the coronavirus.

=== 2 May ===
Saudi Arabia's Finance Minister Mohammed Al-Jadaan has announced that the Saudi Government will take "strict and painful [economic] measures" without giving any details.

=== 3 May ===
Iranian President Hassan Rouhani has announced that mosques in 312 Iranian counties will reopen but would have to comply with social distancing rules.

The Jordanian Government has lifted all restrictions on economic activity including social distancing and health measures in order to jump-start the country's economy.

The Palestinian stock exchange has resumed trading after 40 days of inactivity as part of the Palestinian Authority's efforts to relax lockdown restrictions. Chief Executive Ahmad Aweidah has announced that investors will be allowed to trade remotely in line with health regulations.

In the United Arab Emirates, three shopping centres in Abu Dhabi have reopened after adopting safety measures including social distancing and installing thermal inspection devices.

In Yemen, the Houthi Health Minister Taha Al-Mutawakel has appealed for the United Nations to send them more test kits due to the country's acute economic situation resulting from the Yemeni Civil War and sanctions.

=== 4 May ===
The Bureau International des Expositions (BIE) has voted to delay the Expo 2020 in Dubai to between 1 October 2021 and 31 March 2022.

Syrian President Bashar al-Assad has warned that Syria faces a "real catastrophe" if the number of COVID-19 cases rises and overwhelms health services.

=== 5 May ===
The Afghan Government has distributed free bread to hundreds of thousands of Afghans due to the disruption of food supplies and inflation caused by the COVID-19 pandemic. As part of the first phase of the project, over 250,000 families in Kabul have received ten flat pieces of Naan bread a day.

The Jordanian Government has announced that it will maintain night curfews, which were imposed on 21 March.

The Palestinian Authority has extended a state of emergency in the West Bank by one month. Under the state of emergency, Palestinians have been confined to their homes except for essential travel. UNRWA (the United Nations Relief and Works Agency for Palestine Refugees in the Near East) has warned that the agency only has enough cash to continue covering operating expenditures including paying 30,000 healthcare workers until the end of May 2020 due to American funding cuts.

In the United Arab Emirates, the vehicle for hire company Careem, which is a subsidiary of Uber, has cut 31 percent of its workforce (536 employees) as a result of the economic fallout of the COVID-19 pandemic.

=== 6 May ===
Iranian Ministry of Health and Medical Education spokesperson Kianoush Jahanpour warned COVID-19 cases were rising over the past three to four days due to changes in people's behaviour. Iran had reported 1,680 new cases, bringing the total number to over 100,000.

Morocco has purchased more drones from Chinese drone manufacture DJI.

The Pakistani Government became concerned that repatriated Pakistani migrant workers returning from the United Arab Emirates may be carrying the coronavirus.

Qatar Airways's CEO Akbar Al Baker has announced that the airline would be cutting jobs as a result of the economic fallout of the COVID-19 pandemic.

=== 7 May ===
Egyptian Prime Minister Mostafa Madbouly has extended the country's nighttime curfew until the end of Ramadan.

Pakistani President Imran Khan announced that Pakistan will be lifting lockdown restrictions on 9 May in spite of rising case numbers, due to the adverse economic impact on workers.

=== 8 May ===
Afghan Health Minister Ferozuddin Feroz tests positive for the coronavirus.

Kuwait has imposed a 20–day total curfew between 4pm local time on 10 May and 30 May in order to combat the spread of COVID-19.

The Lebanese Government has eased lockdown restrictions imposed in March, allowing mosques to reopen. However, mosques will have to adhere to social distancing rules.

UNRWA has launched an emergency appeal to raise US$93.4 million to provide food and cash for vulnerable Palestinians over the next three months.

=== 9 May ===
In Afghanistan's Ghor Province, six people have been killed clashes during a protest against the alleged mismanagement of aid to alleviate the social and economic effects of the COVID-19 pandemic.

The Emir of Kuwait Sabah Al-Ahmad Al-Jaber Al-Sabah has warned that the decline in oil princes and the value of investment assets will threaten the country's financial solvency.

The Sudanese state of Khartoum has extended a curfew for ten more days due to a high number of cases. Authorities have also banned travel between the capital Khartoum and other states.

=== 10 May ===
Djibouti's Foreign Minister Mahamoud Ali Youssouf has announced that the country will be lifting lockdown measures despite the high number cases in order to allow people to make a living and go to work.

Iranian authorities reimposed restrictions on Khuzestan province.

Lebanese Interior Minister Mohammad Fahmi has extended the country's nighttime curfew from 7 pm to 5 am local in response to a surge in cases.

=== 13 May ===
Lebanon is examining the possibility of obtaining financial aid via the International Monetary Fund to protect the country's struggling economy, significantly worsened by coronavirus restrictions. The country first asked the IMF for assistance on 1 May.

Emirates, the national airline of the United Arab Emirates, has announced plans to resume some scheduled flight operations from 21 May. In Dubai, public parks and private beaches are permitted to re-open.

=== 17 May ===
In Iran, all cities will allow Eid al-Fitr prayers to be held outside after mosques were closed during the Islamic Holy Month of Ramadan due to coronavirus.

Qatar introduced legislation making the wearing of face masks mandatory in the country, with fines of over $50,000 and three years' jail sentence if caught breaking the rules.

== Reactions and measures in Europe ==
=== 1 May ===
Azerbaijan extends lockdown measures until 31 May.

French President Emmanuel Macron has announced that the end of the national lockdown on 11 May will mark the first step towards rebuilding the country's economy.

In Germany, May Day protesters have defied a ban on social gatherings of more than 20 people by staging demonstrations in Berlin denouncing capitalism and calling for solidarity with refugees. Many protesters wore masks and stood at 1.5 meters apart.

Hungarian Prime Minister Viktor Orbán has warned that Hungary needs to prepare for potential second wave of the coronavirus between October and November during the autumn season. In addition, organisers for the 2020 Formula One World Championship in Hungary announced that the race will take place on 2 August but without spectators to comply with Hungarian social distancing rules.

Irish Taoiseach Leo Varadkar has announced that people over the age of 70 will be permitted to go for short walks and drives from 5 May. Varadkar also announced that the Irish economy would open in five stages between 18 May and 10 August.

Irish budget airliner Ryanair has announced that it plans to slash 3,000 inflight jobs as a result of the economic fallout of the coronavirus pandemic.

Italian Prime Minister Giuseppe Conte has apologised for the Italian Government's delay in paying more than €$50 billion to assist struggling businesses and families.

In Kazakhstan, Air Astana, SCAT, and Qazaq Air have resumed flight operations but middle seats will be empty to ensure social distancing. Passengers will also be required to undergo temperature checks and present certificates confirming that they have tested negative for the coronavirus.

Prime Minister of Slovakia Igor Matovic has lifted a quarantine placed on three Romani villages in April, which had been identified as clusters for the coronavirus.

Spanish Economy and Business Minister Nadia Calviño has forecast that Spain's gross domestic product will contract by 9.2 percent in 2020.

The Swiss Government is testing a contact tracing app on 100 Swiss Army soldiers prior to its planned launch on 11 May.

The Turkish Government has evacuated 300 of its citizens overland from Baghdad and Iraq's southern provinces.

In the United Kingdom, Heathrow Airport has reported a 12.7% drop in revenue to £593 million (US$754 million) in the first quarter of 2020. Passenger numbers also declined by 97% as a result of the coronavirus pandemic. A report by the Institute of Fiscal Studies found that patients from the Bangladeshi, Pakistani, and Black ethnic communities had a higher mortality rate from the coronavirus than White Britons, reporting 2, 2.9, and 3.7 times the rate of white patients respectively. Health Secretary Matt Hancock announced that UK health authorities have conducted 122,347 tests, meeting the British Government's goal of testing 100,000 people.

The World Health Organization's (WHO) Director-General Tedros Adhanom has expressed "grace concerns" about the impact of the coronavirus on countries with "weaker health systems." The WHO emergencies chief Michael Ryan has stated that the coronavirus was of "natural origin", disputing US President Donald Trump's allegation that it had originated in a Chinese laboratory.

=== 2 May ===
French Health Minister Olivier Véran has announced that the French Government will extend the country's health emergency by two months in order to combat the coronavirus.

The Spanish Government has eased lockdown measures by allowing all Spaniards to for walks or play sports after 48 days of home confinement. Spanish Prime Minister Pedro Sánchez has announced that the government will make it compulsory to wear masks on public transportation. Madrid authorities have announced that they will distribute six million masks across the country from 4 May and another seven million to local authorities.

The Turkish Ministry of Trade has lifted export limits on medical equipment and a requirement for public companies to obtain advance permission to export medical supplies and equipment overseas. Turkey has dispatched medical supplies including ventilators to Somalia and the United States.

=== 3 May ===
Armenian Deputy Prime Minister Tigran Avinyan has allowed shops, restaurants, and bars to resume as part of the relaxation of its lockdown policies in order to ease the economic fallout of the coronavirus pandemic.

In Austria, Vienna Airport announced that it will offer onsite coronavirus testing from Monday in order to minimise the risk of inbound passengers being quarantined. The test will cost €190 (US$209) and would be available in two to three hours.

Hungarian budget airline Wizz Air has announced that it will resume flights from European cities to Abu Dhabi from June 2020.

Israel has allowed first, second, and third grade students as well as students in the last two grades of high school to return to classes, which had been shut down in mid-March in order to contain the spread of the coronavirus.

United Kingdom Prime Minister Boris Johnson has acknowledged during a media interview that the British Government had made contingency plans in the event of his death from the coronavirus. Minister for the Cabinet Office Michael Gove announced that the British Government will also test a new coronavirus tracing programme in the Isle of Wight.

=== 4 May ===
The European Commission has approved €7 billion in French state aid to help beleaguered national carrier Air France cushion the economic fallout of the coronavirus pandemic. Later that day, President of the European Commission Ursula von der Leyen announced that the European Union was pledging €1 billion (US$1.09 billion) to finance global research into treatment and vaccines for COVID-19 during an online pledging event. In total, world leaders have pledge €7.4 billion into supporting research into researching vaccines, diagnostics, and treatment of COVID-19.

The Finnish Government announced that they will be lifting COVID-19 restrictions, allowing restaurants, libraries, sports facilities and public services to resume from 1 June. Public gatherings of 50 people will also be allowed from 1 June. Essential travel to Schengen Area countries will be allowed from 14 May.

French President Emmanuel Macron and German Chancellor Angela Merkel have announced that their governments will contribute €500 million and €525 million respectively to global fundraising initiatives to finance research into vaccines and treatment for the coronavirus.

The Germany Health Minister Jens Spahn has warned that it could take years to develop a vaccine for COVID-19 in response to remarks by President Trump that they could have a vaccine by late 2020. That same day, the German government allowed museums, hairdressers, churches and car factories to reopen.

Israeli Prime Minister Benjamin Netanyahu has announced that Israel will be easing several lockdown restrictions including allowing visits to immediate family members, allowing public gatherings of up to 20 people in open areas (to be expanded to 50 people on 17 May), and allowing weddings and funerals of up to 50 people in open areas. Malls and outdoor markets will be allowed to reopen on 7 May. Netanyahu also announced that the process for small businesses and the self-employed will be eased. Kindergartens will reopen on 10 May and all schools are expected to reopen by the end of May. Universities and colleges set to reopen on 14 June. Restrictions on recreational activities will also be used.

In Italy, 4.4 million people have returned to work after the Italian Government eased lockdown restrictions after seven weeks of a nationwide lockdown.

Romanian President Klaus Iohannis has announced that Romania will not extend the state of emergency beyond 15 May but will a "state of alert" allowing some moderate easing of restrictions including lifting travel restrictions for groups of three or less. Public gatherings remain banned.

In Switzerland, environmentalists have delivered a 22,000 petition to the Federal Assembly demanding that the Swiss Government pass a US$64 billion aid package encouraging "green recovery" and demanding that state support be tied to reducing carbon emissions.

Turkish President Recep Tayyip Erdoğan announced that Turkey will be relaxing lockdown restrictions in May, June, and July. He announced that young people and senior citizens will be allowed to spend four hours outside a day from the weekend onwards. Travel restrictions were lifted in some cities. Some shops and services will be allowed to reopen on 11 May while universities will reopen on 15 June. However, Erdoğan warned that the Turkish Government would impose harsher measures if citizens did not abide by the normalisation plan.

The Ukrainian Government has extended the nationwide lockdown until 22 May but has eased health restrictions including reopening parks, recreational areas, shops specialising in household goods and textiles, and eateries for takeaways.

In the United Kingdom, a spokesperson for British Prime Minister Boris Johnson stated that research was needed regarding the origin and spread of COVID-19 in order to prepare for future pandemics. Deputy Chief Medical Officer Jonathan Van-Tam issued a statement at a press conference that the UK would only ease lockdown restrictions once the number of cases had started to decline. Van-Tam also confirmed that most coronavirus patients developed antibodies against COVID-19 but that results were still too early to indicate whether they provided immunity.

World Health Organization Director-General Tedros Adhanom called for the world to work together to defeat COVID-19, praising recent pledges of US$8 billion by world leaders to combat the pandemic.

=== 5 May ===
European Commissioner for Internal Market Thierry Breton has denied that the European Union has been "naive" in its dealings with China during a France Info radio interview.

French Secretary of State for the Digital Economy Cédric O has announced that the French Government plans to launch its "StopCOVID" contact tracing app by 2 June. French President Emmanuel Macron has warned that travel within the European Union and abroad will be limited during the summer of 2020 in order to minimise the risk of the resurgence of COVID-19.

Several German states have eased lockdown requirements despite German Chancellor Angela Merkel's pleas for "prudence" in efforts to contain the COVID-19 pandemic.

Hungarian budget airliner Wizz Air reported a 98 decline in passenger numbers in April as a result of the COVID-19 pandemic, with the airline carrying 78,389 passengers that month.

An Israeli Knesset panel has allowed the country's domestic intelligence agency Shin Bet to continue using mobile phone data to track the movements of coronavirus patients until 26 May.

In the Netherlands, the Mayor of the Hague ordered police to disperse a 200-strong protest against the country's lockdown measures, detaining dozens of protesters. Dutch scientists have also identified an antibody capable of resisting the coronavirus during lab tests.

Turkish Industry and Technology Minister Mustafa Varank has announced that all major Turkish automotive factories can resume operations from 11 May.

The United Kingdom's National Cyber Security Centre (NCSC) and the United States' Cybersecurity and Infrastructure Security Agency (CISA) issued a joint statement stating that government-backed hackers had been targeting pharmaceutical companies, research organisations and local governments in order to steal information about efforts to combat the COVID-19 pandemic. Iran, China, and Russia have denied any role in these attacks and have claimed to be the victims of similar cyber attacks. British carrier Virgin Atlantic has announced that it will slash over 3,000 jobs as a result of the economic fallout of the coronavirus pandemic.

World Health Organization spokesperson Christian Lindmeier has stated that there may be more earlier reports of the coronavirus after a French hospital discovered it had treated a man with COVID-19 in 27 December after retesting pneumonia patients' samples, nearly a month before French health authorities confirmed the country's first case.

Tajikistan's Health Minister Nasim Olimzoda resigns over allegations that the Tajik Government had downplayed the seriousness of the coronavirus pandemic.

=== 6 May ===
The European Commissioner for Economy Paolo Gentiloni has predicted that the European Union will face an economic recession this year with a decline in economic output of more than seven percent.

Dutch Prime Minister Mark Rutte has announced the easing lockdown restrictions over a period of four months. Rutte also announced that recreational golf and tennis would be allowed from 11 May but that organised sports would resume from 1 September.

French vaccines subsidiary Sanofi Pasteur has announced that it is planning testing an experimental vaccine that it is developing in partnership with the British company GlaxoSmithKline.

The German Government has announced that Germany's football league Bundesliga will resume matches from 15 May.

Russian Culture Minister Olga Lyubimova has tested positive for the coronavirus. Russian President Vladimir Putin has warned against rushing to lift lockdown measures, warning that doing so would undo efforts to combat COVID-19.

The Slovak government has reopened several businesses including restaurant terraces, hotels, and all shops outside of shopping malls. The Government has allowed weddings and religious services to take place with limited numbers.

Spain's parliament, the Cortes Generales, has extended the country's state of emergency by two weeks.

Turkish Health Minister Fahrettin Koca has announced plans to reopening the economy including specifying social distancing and facial mask requirements.

In the United Kingdom, British epidemiologist Neil Ferguson resigned from the British Government's Scientific Advisory Group for Emergencies (SAGE) after breaching lockdown and social distancing rules by meeting with his married lover.

UK Prime Minister Boris Johnson has stated that the British Government will announce its plan to ease coronavirus lockdown restrictions from Sunday (9 May).

World Health Organization Director-General Tedros Adhanom urged countries emerging from lockdown to do it "extremely carefully and in a phased approach".

=== 7 May ===
The Danish Government has allowed the entire retail sector including shopping malls to reopen from 11 May. Restaurants and cafes will reopen one week later.

French Prime Minister Edouard Philippe has announced that France will be relaxing COVID-19 lockdown restrictions from 11 May but that some restrictions would remain in Paris due to several new cases. French Interior Minister Christophe Castaner confirmed that the country's borders will remain closed despite the planned lifting of the nationwide lockdown on 11 May.

German Chancellor Angela Merkel stated during a media interview that the coronavirus pandemic could last for a year. Yesterday, Merkel had announced steps to ease Germany's lockdown while launching an "emergency break mechanism" in the event of a resurgence of the pandemic. The Robert Koch Institute has estimated that the coronavirus' reproduction rate is 0.65, meaning that 100 people who contracted the disease infect on average 65; suggesting that the rate of infection is declining. A senior German health official Lars Schaade also warned that a second COVID-19 wave was possible depending on people's behaviour and compliance with health and social distancing regulations.

Germany's football league Bundesliga has announced that professional and second division matches will resume on 16 May.

Georgian Prime Minister Giorgi Gakharia has announced that the Georgian Government will lift the lockdown in Tbilisi and allow shops to reopen on 11 May. The lockdown on Rustavi will be lifted on 14 May. Domestic tourism will resume on 15 June while foreign tourists will be allowed into the country from 1 July. The country remains in a state of emergency until 22 May, which includes a night curfew, the closure non-essential businesses, and a ban on gatherings of more than three people.

The Icelandic Government has eased coronavirus lockdown restrictions by allowing gatherings of up to 50 people and letting children's activities return to normal.

Italian Prime Minister Giuseppe Conte and Roman Catholic Church Archbishop Gualtiero Bassetti have signed an agreement to allow Italians Catholics to attend Mass from 18 May, ending a dispute between the two parties. Under lockdown restrictions, the Government had not allowed Masses as part of its ban on public gatherings. Italian priests will determine the number of people allowed into churches and churches may hold multiple services to comply with social distancing requirements.

Latvian Prime Minister Krisjanis Karins has announced that Latvia will allow public gatherings of 25 people from 12 May as part of efforts to ease the lockdown.

In the Netherlands, Health Minister Hugo de Jonge clarified that spectators could not attend sports arenas until a vaccine for the coronavirus had been developed.

Norwegian Prime Minister Erna Solberg has announced that Norway will be reopening by mid-June, citing the country's success in containing the COVID-19 pandemic.

The Polish governing coalition has postponed the 2020 Polish presidential election due to the COVID-19 pandemic. Poland's lower legislature, the Sejm, has passed government-sponsored legislation allowing the presidential election to resume by postal vote.

In Russia, Mayor of Moscow Sergei Sobyanin has extended the city's lockdown restrictions until 31 May. In the United Kingdom, a study by a team of University College London researchers Dr Rob Aldridge and Dr Delan Devakumar published in Wellcome Open Research found that the risk of dying from COVID-19 was 3.24 times higher for Black Africans, 2.41 times higher for British Bangladeshis, 2.21 times higher for Black Caribbeans and 1.7 times higher for British Indians compared to the general population. Their study drew upon National Health Service data of 16,272 patients who had died from COVID-19 between 1 March and 21 April. The study's findings were endorsed by the British Government's Office for National Statistics.

A spokesperson for British Prime Minister Boris Johnson announced that the UK Government will announce a limited easing of the country's lockdown restrictions next week. Organisers have postponed the 2020 Notting Hill Carnival due to the COVID-19 pandemic. Foreign Secretary Dominic Raab has opposed easing the country's lockdown, warning that doing so could lead to an increase in infection rates. Similar, Deputy First Minister of Northern Ireland Michelle O'Neill has announced that Northern Ireland does not intend to lift coronavirus pandemic restrictions.

Secretary of State for Northern Ireland Brandon Lewis acknowledged that UK health authorities were unable to use 400,000 medical gowns imported from Turkey since they did not meet British standards.

The United Nations Office on Drugs and Crime issued a statement noting that coronavirus-related restrictions have pushed up the price of illicit drugs.

=== 8 May ===
The European Commission has announced that it will distribute 10 million masks to health workers across the European Union and the United Kingdom. The commission announced that 1.5 million masks will be sent to 17 member states and the UK. The rest will be delivered in weekly installments over the next few weeks. That same day, the European Commission also supported maintaining travel restrictions for another 30 days in order to limit the spread of COVID-19. In addition, the European Commission allowed European governments to assist companies hit by the economic fallout of the coronavirus pandemic by acquiring stakes in the firms, which will be subject to a ban on dividends, share buybacks, bonuses and acquisitions.

World War Two commemoration services and parades throughout Europe have been scaled down due to social distancing restrictions and limitations on mass gatherings. German Chancellor Angela Merkel and German President Frank-Walter Steinmeier have laid wreaths at a service in Berlin marking the 75th anniversary of the end of World War Two. French President Emmanuel Macron attended an event at Champs-Elysees. In the United Kingdom, street parades by veterans were cancelled.

Scientists based at the Vlaams Instituut voor Biotechnologie in Ghent, Belgium and the University of Texas, Austin are working to develop an anti-viral treatment based on llama antibodies.

Germany's Federal Intelligence Service has disputed allegations by US Vice President Mike Pence that the coronavirus originated in a Chinese laboratory, adding that the accusations are an attempt to divert attention away from US efforts to contain the virus.

The Germany chapter of the Fridays for Future staged a protest outside the Hamburg City Hall while observing strict social distancing measures.

Ireland's Central Statistics Office has recorded that the country's unemployment rate rose to 28.2% in late April. This figure includes those receiving the emergency coronavirus jobless benefit, which accounts for 5.4%.

=== 9 May ===
Belarus has held a military parade to commemorate the 75th anniversary of the end of World War II in Europe, drawing large crowds. By contrast, Russian authorities have cancelled the Victory Day celebrations in order to contain the spread of the coronavirus.

German Chancellor Angela Merkel and Pope Francis agreed on the need to help poor countries during a telephone conversation on the humanitarian and political situation relating to the coronavirus pandemic. Dresden's soccer team, the Dynamo Dresden, have been placed into quarantine after two members tested positive for COVID-19.

Spanish Prime Minister Pedro Sánchez has called on people to obey social distancing rules as the country prepares to ease lockdown measures on 11 May, warning that "the virus has not disappeared."

The United Kingdom Government has informed airlines that it plans to introduce a 14-day quarantine period for people entering the country. Airliners have raised concerns that it would have damaging repercussions on the aviation industry and economy, and have called for a "credible exit plan" and weekly review.

=== 10 May ===
Montenegrin Prime Minister Dusko Markovic has promoted his country as a "CoronaFree" holiday destination, with the holiday season due to begin on 1 July.

In Russia, Mayor of Moscow Sergei Sobyanin confirmed that a fire at a Moscow hospital treating patients of the coronavirus had been killed. 200 patients were also evacuated from the hospital.

The Turkish Government has relaxed restrictions on elderly people over the age of 65, allowing them to leave their homes for four hours a day. The Government also announced plans to allow young people under the age of 20 to leave their homes later in the week.

United Kingdom Secretary of State for Transport Grant Shapps has announced that British Government's coronavirus test–and–tracing app trial is going well on the Isle of Wight. That same day, British Prime Minister Boris Johnson announced that country's lockdown will remain in place until 1 June while lifting some lockdown restrictions. From 11 May, people will be encouraged to return to work as said by Keir Starmer. From 13 May, people will be allowed to exercise for an unlimited time while adhering to social distancing measures.

=== 12 May ===
The British Transport Police have launched an investigation into the death of London railway ticket office worker Belly Mujinga, who became ill after being spat upon by a man who claimed that he had COVID-19 on 22 March 2020. The Transport Salaried Staffs Association had highlighted Mujinga's death to draw attention to transport staff's dangerous working conditions and lack of personal protective equipment.

=== 13 May ===
The German Interior Minister Horst Seehofer announces the country's plans for free travel in Europe by 15 June. Restrictions on the Austrian border will be eased on 15 May to allow business trips and family visits. The Austrian Government also announced that there are plans in place to re-open the Austrian-German border in mid June.

The Irish Taoiseach Leo Varadkar has said that Ireland may introduce a mandatory quarantine for arriving international travellers, rather than the current system whereby the quarantine is only advised. This comes days after the British government announced plans for a similar measure.

Polish Prime Minister Mateusz Morawiecki has announced that Poland will reopen hairdressers and restaurants from 18 May and the return of students in the first three years of school.

Professor Albert Rizvanov, director of the Clinical Research Centre for Precision and Regenerative Medicine at Russia's Kazan Federal University claimed that hot weather does not kill COVID-19, despite earlier claims that the virus could not survive temperatures above 36 °C. This comes as Russia confirmed more than 10,000 new cases in a day. Russia suspended the use of a certain brand Russian-manufactured ventilators that have caused two fires.

The Turkish Government's economic stimulus to support businesses during the pandemic has reached $34 billion, equivalent to 5% of the Turkish GDP, Finance Minister Berat Albayrak has said.

In England, the first easing of lockdown restrictions occurred, with people being allowed outside for unlimited exercise and essential businesses being encouraged to reopen. These restrictions only applied to England, with the other parts of the UK remaining under a tighter lockdown. Public Health England approved a coronavirus antibody test kit manufactured by Swiss company Roche Holdings AG after it was found to be close to 100% accurate.

Spain imposed 14 day quarantine on all incoming foreign travelers.

=== 14 May ===
Josep Borrell, the foreign policy chief of the European Union has called on China to help fight the coronavirus pandemic, and called an independent inquiry into the origins of the virus.

The European Commission halted the delivery of 10 million Chinese face masks after some countries raised concerns over poor quality.

In Finland, schools have reopened despite warnings from teachers that it may not be totally safe. Education Minister Li Andersson confirmed the news on 29 April.

France announced travellers coming from Spain must undergo quarantine after Spanish authorities announced a 10-day mandatory quarantine on travellers coming from France. The official said that these measures would be applied to all countries that impose quarantines on arriving French citizens.

In Italy, the head of the scientific committee, Agostino Miozzo announced 150,000 citizens in 2,000 urban settlements would undergo testing to help determine the spread of the disease.

In Poland, it was announced that schools will remain closed until the end of the school year.

In the United Kingdom, Transport Secretary Grant Shapps announced that a coronavirus test and trace app is being mass-tested on the Isle of Wight.

The Vatican City has stated that people attending Mass in St. Peter's Basilica will have their temperatures checked upon arrival.

=== 15 May ===
Austrian Chancellor Sebastian Kurz announced that he had reached an agreement with Switzerland and Liechtenstein to fully allow travel across the borders from 15 June, whilst confirming that similar talks were being held with the leaders of eastern European countries.

Authorities in the Czech Republic have said that gatherings of up to 300 people, including sports events, will be allowed later in the month as the country's coronavirus infection rate remained the lowest in Europe. Health Minister Adam Vojtěch said many businesses will be allowed to re-open on 25 May.

Amazon has stated that it aims to begin reopening its facilities in France on 19 May.

The European Broadcasting Union, organisers of the Eurovision Song Contest, have revealed that an alternative, non-competitive show entitled Eurovision: Europe Shine A Light will be broadcast on 16 May. The 2020 edition of the contest was cancelled due to coronavirus.

Prime Minister of Georgia Giorgi Gakharia ended the state of emergency declared in response to the coronavirus pandemic on 22 May.

In Germany, preliminary data showed their economy had suffered the steepest three-month contraction since the Great Recession.

Irish Taoiseach Leo Varadkar confirmed that the country will introduce a mandatory 14-day quarantine period for international travellers, although travellers from the British territory of Northern Ireland will be exempt.

The Portuguese National Institute for Statistics revealed that Portugal's economy contracted by 3.9% in the first quarter, and estimated that the country's GDP shrank by 2.4%.

In Slovenia, the government announced an end to the country's coronavirus epidemic. People entering Slovenia from the European Union will no longer have to enter a mandatory seven-day quarantine, although a 14-day quarantine remains in place for arrivals from non-EU countries. The government confirmed that the public will still be expected to keep to "basic rules" to prevent spread of the virus.

In the United Kingdom, authorities approved the manufacture of COVID-19 antibody tests by Abbott Laboratories, shortly after giving approval to Swiss company Roche Holding AG.

=== 16 May ===
The Austrian Government will reopen the country's borders with the Czech Republic, Slovakia and Hungary from 15 June, although restrictions will remain in place for travel to Italy.

The German Bundesliga resumed after a two-month break during the country's coronavirus lockdown. Finance Minister Olaf Scholz is reportedly preparing an economic stimulus package worth 57 billion euros in response to decreased tax incomes for local municipalities. A number of anti-lockdown protests have occurred across Germany, including a demonstration in Stuttgart with more than 5,000 attendees.

Prime Minister of Hungary Viktor Orban has announced that lockdown restrictions will be eased in Budapest from 18 May, announcing via Facebook that the city will move to the "second phase of defence".

In Italy, the government will loosen coronavirus travel restrictions, which will see people allowed to move more freely within their home region from 18 May, as well as allowing inter-regional journeys from 3 June. International travel will also resume from 3 June, albeit with strict social distancing rules remaining in place.

In the United Kingdom, London's Metropolitan Police arrested nineteen people breaking social distancing rules whilst protesting about the government's response to the pandemic in Hyde Park.

=== 17 May ===
The Russian government announced that foreign athletes would be able to enter the country to participate in domestic sports competitions.

Prime Minister of the United Kingdom Boris Johnson warned there could potentially never be a vaccine for COVID-19.

== Reactions and measures in South and Southeast Asia ==
=== 1 May ===
The Indian Government announces plans to make the contract tracing app Aarogya Setu compulsory for everything including going to work and traveling on public transportation, raising concerns about privacy and surveillance from digital experts. The Indian Government also announced that they would extend the nationwide lockdown for two weeks after 4 May but would ease restrictions in lower risk areas. Travel restrictions on air, rail, metro, and inter-state movement by road remain suspended while schools, colleges, hotels, restaurants, shopping malls, cinemas, and places of worship remain closed.

Indian authorities have also organised a special train transporting 1,200 migrant workers, who had been stranded as a result of lockdown measures, from Lingampally in southern state of Telangana to Hatia in the eastern state of Jharkhand. During a video conference, several film producers, directors and actors opined that it would take two years for Bollywood to recover.

Malaysian Prime Minister Muhyiddin Yassin announced that most businesses will be allowed to reopen from 4 May with the exception of cinemas and bazaars since they involve large gatherings. Malaysian Transport Minister Dr Wee Ka Siong confirmed that all public transportation services would resume on 4 May as part of the gradual relaxation of the country's movement control order. Human Rights Watch and the Asia Pacific Refugee Rights Network have reported that over 700 foreign migrant workers and refugees including Rohingya have been detained by Malaysian law enforcement authorities during the coronavirus pandemic.

=== 2 May ===
The Indian Government has extended the country's coronavirus lockdown by two weeks.

The United Nations in Malaysia's Head of Communications and Advocacy, Ahmad Hafiz Osman, called for migrants, refugees, asylum seekers, and stateless individuals in Malaysia to have access to health services and services without fear of repercussions.

Health Minister Gan Kim Yong has announced that Singapore will lessen restrictions including allowing some businesses to resume operations on 12 May and that some students will be allowed to return to school from 19 May.

=== 4 May ===
The Indian Government has indicated that it will begin to ease lockdown restrictions. The Indian government has colour-coded states and cities into red, orange, and green zones based on the number of cases. Each type of zone has different levels of restrictions. All travel is forbidden, and schools, shopping malls, hotels, and public spaces remain closed.

The Malaysian federal government has allowed businesses including restaurants to reopen. Due to a spike of cases over the weekends, some state governments have indicated that they will not ease restrictions.

=== 5 May ===
The Indian Government has announced that it will repatriate 190,000 Indian nationals over the next several weeks including the Middle East. In the first week, the Indian Government intends to bring back 14,800 nationals from 12 countries including United States, Britain, the United Arab Emirates, Saudi Arabia, Qatar, Kuwait, Bangladesh, the Philippines, Singapore and Malaysia. The Indian Navy has also diverted three ships to bring back 1,000 Indian nationals from the Maldives and Middle East.

=== 6 May ===
The Indian Government has embarked on efforts to repatriate 400,000 stranded Indian nationals via chartered flights and Indian Navy ships.

Indonesian President Joko Widodo expressed a sense of urgency to bring the country's COVID-19 pandemic under control and to "break the curve" in May. The Indonesian Government has also postponed the country's local elections until December 2020.

=== 7 May ===
Indian health authorities have identified a new cluster in the Koyambedu market in Chennai, which has been linked to 500 cases in Tamil Nadu and the adjacent Kerala states. Indian authorities are contact tracing and quarantining 7,000 people who visited the market. Areas with high numbers of COVID-19 cases include Mumbai, New Delhi, and Ahmedabad.

=== 8 May ===
The Malaysian Department of Statistics has released findings showing that 42.5% of companies will need at least six months to recover from the lockdown restrictions, which were lifted on 4 May. The Statistics Department also reported the country's retail sales fell 5.7% to a seven-year low in March 2020.

=== 10 May ===
Malaysian Prime Minister Muhyiddin Yassin has extended the country's movement control order (MCO) until 9 June, the fourth extension since 18 March. Earlier, the Malaysian Government had downgraded lockdown restrictions on 4 May under a "condition MCO," which allowed certain businesses to resume operations.

=== 12 May ===
Indian Prime Minister Narendra Modi has announced an economic stimulus package worth $266 billion, equivalent to 10% of India's GDP, to support the economy during the coronavirus pandemic, largely praised by investors and economists around the world.

=== 16 May ===
Cambodia will not ease coronavirus lockdown restrictions, despite all infected patients recovering from the virus.

Reports suggest that hospitals in India's most populous city, Mumbai, are close to collapse as the country deals with the coronavirus.

=== 17 May ===
India's coronavirus lockdown was extended to 31 May.

A spokeswoman for Indonesia's Ministry of Finance stated that the government is preparing an economic stimulus package of $8.6 billion to support businesses through the pandemic.

The Sri Lankan government reintroduced a 24-hour curfew for the weekend.

=== 22 May ===
Malaysian Prime Minister Muhyiddin Yassin entered into a 14-day quarantine after an officer attending a post-Cabinet meeting on 21 May tested positive for COVID-19.

=== 28 May ===
The Malaysian Ministry of National Unity announced that a total of 174 non-Muslim houses of worship have been allowed to resume operations from 10 June according to the "Standard Operating Procedure for Houses of Worship in Green Zones." Marriages at temples, churches, and religious associations have been postponed until 31 July 2020.

== Reactions and measures in Western Pacific ==
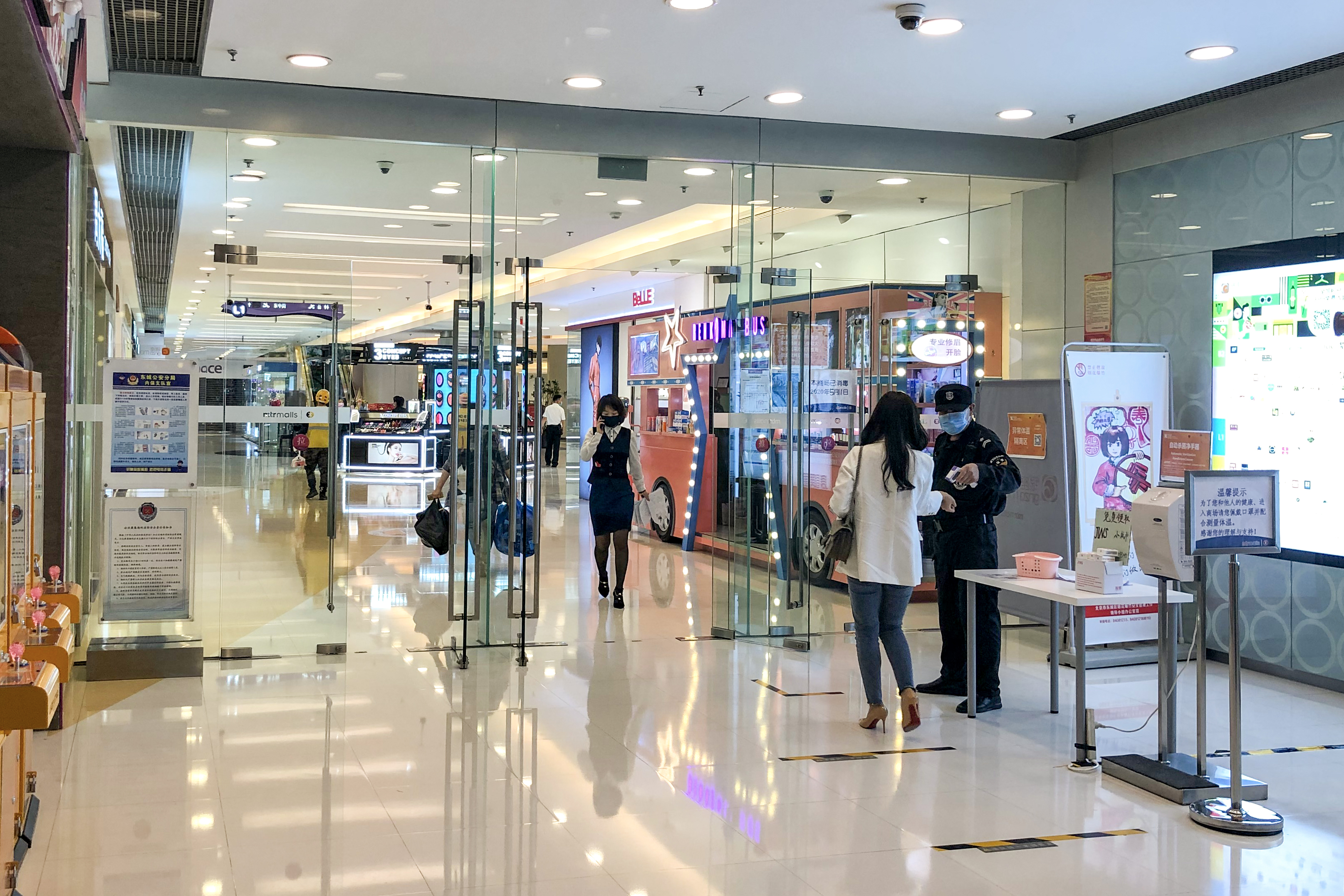
Thermometry is still required when entering public areas in China as of May 2020

=== 1 May ===
Australian Prime Minister Scott Morrison announced that the Australian Government will make a decision by 8 May on whether to relax movement restrictions. Morrison also described Australia's relations with China as mutually beneficial in the face of tensions over Canberra seeking an international inquiry into China's handling of the COVID-19 pandemic in Wuhan. Later, Morrison stated that he had no evidence to suggest that the coronavirus originated in a Wuhan laboratory.

Chinese authorities announced that they will be reopening Beijing's Palace Museum on 1 May. Hubei provincial authorities announced that the province will lower its emergency response level from highest to second highest on 2 April.

Japanese Prime Minister Shinzo Abe announced that the Japanese Government would decide by 4 May whether to extend the country's state of emergency, which was set to expire on 6 May.

The Philippines Government relaxed restrictions, placing areas with fewer cases under a more relaxed quarantine; allowing work, public transport and businesses to resume operations at a reduced capacity.

According to figures released by the South Korean Ministry of Trade, Industry and Energy, South Korean exports declined by 24.3% in April 2020.

World Health Organization spokesperson Tarik Jasarevic stated that WHO was seeking an invitation from China to participate in investigations into the animal origins of the coronavirus.

=== 2 May ===
The Japan Sumo Association announced that it will reconsider rescheduling its grand summer tournament scheduled for 24 May if the Japanese Government decides to extend the nationwide lockdown, which was scheduled to end on 6 May.

In the Philippines, Associate Justice of the Supreme Court Marvic Leonen confirmed that the Philippines Government released 9,731 prisoners, mainly those awaiting trial who could not afford bail, in an effort to ease the spread of the coronavirus in the country's overcrowded prison system.

=== 3 May ===
The Philippines banned incoming flights for one week. 20,000 repatriated Filipinos underwent mandatory quarantine.

Thailand eased restrictions on restaurants, hair salons and outdoor markets as long as they adhere to social distancing rules and conduct temperature tests.

South Korean Prime Minister Chung Sye-Kyun announced the easing of social distancing restrictions, allowing businesses to reopen and allow public gatherings to take place provided they followed disinfection guidelines.

=== 4 May ===
In Australia, New South Wales began opening schools. New South Wales Premier Gladys Berejiklian confirmed that a seven-year-old boy had tested positive for COVID-19, and the school was closed.

The Associated Press reported that a United States Department of Homeland Security report dated 1 May states that intelligence officials believed that China covered up the extent of the COVID-19 outbreak to allow time for them to stock up on supplies.

Chinese state broadcaster China Central Television issued a statement accusing United States Secretary of State Mike Pompeo of "wantonly spewing poison and spreading lies" about the origins of the COVID-19 pandemic in response to Pompeo's statement claiming that the coronavirus had originated in a laboratory in Wuhan.

Japanese Economy Minister Yasutoshi Nishimura announced the extension of the state of emergency, due to expire on 6 May, until 31 May.

New Zealand Prime Minister Jacinda Ardern met with Australian Prime Minister Scott Morrison via video conference. Topics including the possible creation of an Australian-New Zealand travel bubble.

The South Korean Education Minister Yoo Eun-hae announced that South Korean will reopen schools in stages from 13 May. She also indicated that schools may switch to online learning if a student contracts COVID-19.

FINA (the International Swimming Federation) postponed the 2021 World Aquatics Championships, scheduled for Fukuoka, Japan in May 2021 to 13–29 May 2022.

=== 5 May ===
The Australian and New Zealand Prime Ministers Scott Morrison and Jacinda Ardern along with several Australian state and territorial leaders pledged to work together to develop a trans-Tasman COVID-safe travel zone that would allow residents from both countries to travel freely without travel restrictions. Ardern however has ruled out including the Pacific Islands within this travel bubble, citing the danger of COVID-19 spreading to unaffected Pacific states. During a media conference, Morrison stated that the coronavirus most likely originated in a wildlife wet market in Wuhan as opposed to a laboratory while supporting calls for an inquiry into the origins of the COVID-19 pandemic in Wuhan.

The South Korean government allowed professional sporting bodies including the Korea Baseball Organization to resume professional sports in empty stadiums.

=== 6 May ===
In China, authorities in the northeastern border town of Suifenhe announced the loosening of restrictions brought in to combat a surge of cases from neighbouring Russia. 120 schools in Wuhan reopened for nearly 60,000 senior high school students.

The Hong Kong Department of Health issued quarantine orders to more than 170,000 international travellers. The Hong Kong Government has warned that is pursuing a "zero tolerance" policy against quarantine violators, who face an investigation and prison terms.

The Philippines Department of Health announced that it will be testing Avigan on 100 coronavirus patients.

Taiwanese Health Minister Chen Shih-chung called on WHO to provide Taiwan with access to "first hand information" about the COVID-19 pandemic. The Health Minister also eased restrictions on outdoor climbing and team sports.

The Walt Disney Company announced that the Shanghai Disney Resort will reopen on 11 May.

=== 7 May ===
Chinese Foreign Ministry spokesperson Hua Chunying reiterated Beijing's support for WHO's efforts to combat the COVID-19 pandemic. She criticised the US and other countries for "politicising" the issue and accused US Secretary of State Mike Pompeo of spreading lies about China.

Japanese Economy Minister Yasutoshi Nishimura said that restrictions could be lifted in areas where infection rates have declined. That same day, the Japanese Government approved Gilead Sciences' remdesivir as a treatment for COVID-19.

New Zealand Sport and Recreation Minister Grant Robertson announced that professional sports will be able to resume domestically next week under COVID-19 Alert Level 2 with the necessary public health measures in place.

=== 8 May ===
Australian Prime Minister Scott Morrison announced the easing of social distancing measures as part of a three-stage process to eliminate most restrictions by July 2020 and to get 1 million people back to work. Morrison also clarified that Australian states and territories would decide when to implement each stage, which will be separated by a four-week transition. Treasurer Josh Frydenberg estimated that the lockdown was costing the Australian economy A$4 billion (US$2.6 billion) a week while the Reserve Bank of Australia warned that the Australian economy could contract by 10% as a result of the COVID-19 pandemic.

Chinese Foreign Ministry spokesperson Hua Chunying announced that the Chinese Government supports a review of WHO's response to the COVID-19 pandemic at an "appropriate time" after the pandemic is over.

Hong Kong allowed gyms, bars, beauty parlours, and cinemas to reopen as part of a relaxation of social distancing measures. A team of University of Hong Kong researchers led by Dr Michael Chan Chi-Wai have identified the eyes as an important route for the SARS-CoV-2 virus to enter the human body. The study, published in The Lancet Respiratory Medicine, also found that the coronavirus was more infectious than SARS and the bird flu.

The Korea Centers for Disease Control and Prevention (Korea CDC) Director Jeong Eun-kyeong announced it was investigating a cluster of outbreaks linked to nightclubs in the capital Seoul's Itaewon neighbourhood.

Japanese Prime Minister Shinzo Abe and US President Donald Trump agreed to cooperate to develop COVID-19 vaccines and drugs, and to rejuvenate their economies. The Japanese Ministry of Health, Labour and Welfare lowered the temperature-related criteria for COVID-19 testing, allowing a wider range of people to check whether they are infected with COVID-19. Previously, only those who had a fever of 37.5 Celsius (99.5 Fahrenheit) or more for four consecutive days could access testing.

WHO food safety and animal diseases expert Peter Ben Embarek called for more research into Wuhan's Huanan Seafood Wholesale Market's role as an "amplifying setting" in the COVID-19 pandemic.

=== 9 May ===
The Australian states of Victoria and New South Wales indicated the lessening of business restrictions from next week. Queensland announced that it will ease travel and movement restrictions in a three-stage process, commencing on 15 May. South Australia announced that it will ease all movement restrictions by 11 May while Tasmania will allow people to visit national parks and reserves within 30 km of their homes from 11 May. The Australian Capital Territory allowed people to visit each other and public gatherings of ten people. Th Northern Territory allowed people to visit parks and reserves from 1 June with plans to reopen all businesses, facilities, and services by 5 June.

Chinese Communist Party general secretary Xi Jinping sent a letter to Korean Workers' Party chairman Kim Jong-Un, affirming Beijing's support for Pyongyang in combating the COVID-19 pandemic.

Hong Kong researchers have tested a three-drug cocktail consisting of lopinavir/ritonavir, ribavirin and interferon-beta on 127 patients with mild symptoms associated with COVID-19. The trial found that patients treated with this cocktail recovered faster than patients given just lopinavir-ritonavir.

South Korean Vice Health Minister Kim Gang Iip announced that health authorities are developing plans to share hospital capacities between the capital Seoul and nearby towns to ensure swift transport of patients and that a spike of infections in one cluster doesn't overwhelm the country's healthcare system. In addition, Seoul authorities have closed 21,000 nightclubs, hostess bars, and discos after 17 cases were linked to a 29-year old clubgoer in the Itaewon neighbourhood.

=== 10 May ===
In Australia, New South Wales Premier Gladys Berejiklian allowed restaurants, playgrounds and outdoor pools to reopen after extensive testing showed that the spread of COVID-19 had slowed sharply. Australian Chief Medical Officer Brendan Murphy dismissed conspiracy theories that COVID-19 is linked to 5G cellular phone technology following an anti-lockdown protest in Melbourne. Protesters had claimed that the COVID-19 pandemic was a government conspiracy to control the global population.

=== 11 May ===
New Zealand Prime Minister Jacinda Ardern announced that the country will downgrade its lockdown to alert level 2 from 14 May, lifting lockdown restrictions while maintaining physical distancing in public and for private gatherings with more than ten people. Schools could reopen on 18 May, while bars (defined as on-licence premises which primarily serve beverages) could reopen on 21 May. A decision will be made on 25 May on whether to raise the ten–people limit on private gatherings.

South Korean President Moon Jae-in urged citizens not to lower their guard but has urged calm in the midst of an infection cluster around Seoul's Itaewon's neighbourhood.

=== 13 May ===
Chinese authorities in Wuhan announce preparations for the testing of all 11 million residents after six new cases were confirmed at the weekend.

The New Zealand Government passed the COVID-19 Public Health Response Bill which allows police to enter homes without a warrant to enforce lockdown restrictions despite opposition from the National and ACT parties as well as the Human Rights Commission. The Government also lifted the country's state of emergency, revised level 2 restrictions to allow people to attend funerals and tangihanga, and shifted NCEA high school exams from 6 November to 16 November.

=== 14 May ===
The Australian Bureau of Statistics recorded the country's biggest ever monthly rise in unemployment because of coronavirus lockdown measures. Employment in April dropped by 594,300 to a record of 6.2% unemployment.

Authorities in the Chinese city of Wuhan begin the planned testing of all 11 million residents of the city after a cluster of new cases was reported at the weekend.

Japan's Prime Minister Shinzo Abe lifted the state of emergency in most of the country, although it has been retained in Tokyo and Osaka. The Japanese company Takeda Pharmaceutical also announced that it could start a clinical trial by July for a potential COVID-19 treatment, based on antibodies collected from a recovered patient's blood.

New Zealand's Finance Minister Grant Robertson has unveiled a NZ$50 billion fund, equivalent to 17% of the country's GDP, to protect jobs and reduce unemployment to pre-coronavirus levels within two years. The figure is 17 times greater than the sum that the New Zealand government usually allocates to new spending in its budgets.

=== 15 May ===
In the Australian state of New South Wales, food establishments were allowed to re-open. In the Northern Territory, pubs have reopened with no restrictions on customer numbers and the limit on public gatherings and house visits was removed, prompting concerns over a potential rise in infections.

The Hong Kong economy shrank 8.9% in the first quarter of 2020 amidst the coronavirus pandemic and social unrest in the city.

In South Korea, the Yonhap news agency has reported that health authorities will disinfect food and drink establishments in Seoul's nightlife district Itaewon after 17 new infections were linked to the area.

=== 16 May ===
The president of the Australian Medical Association Tony Bartone urged people to be vigilant after the states of New South Wales and Queensland started easing lockdown restrictions earlier in the week.

In the Chinese city of Wuhan, health authorities claim to have conducted over 100,000 nucleic acid tests on 15 May after beginning a testing campaign across the whole city in response to a cluster of new domestically transmitted cases was reported to authorities.

=== 17 May ===
In the Australian state of New South Wales, churches held their first Sunday services since coronavirus lockdown restrictions were imposed in the country, albeit with a heavily reduced capacity.

Government officials from South Korea and China are reportedly consulting Japan's government in the hope of easing border restrictions between the countries to assist in the recovery of business.

=== 20 May ===
The New Zealand Ministry of Health officially launched a contact tracing app called NZ COVID Tracer, which was available on App Store and Google Play. It allows users to scan their QR codes at businesses, public buildings and other organisations to track where they have been for contract tracing purposes.

=== 25 May ===
New Zealand Prime Minister Jacinda Ardern announced that the limit on social gatherings like religious services, weddings, and funerals would be raised to 100 at 12pm on 29 May 2020. She also announced that Cabinet would make a decision on moving into Alert level 1 on 8 June, with 22 June set as the tentative date for moving into alert level 1. That same day, MediaWorks CEO Michael Anderson announced that the company would be eliminating 130 jobs in its sales, out-of-home, and radio divisions as a result of the economic effects of the coronavirus pandemic.

== See also ==
- Timeline of the COVID-19 pandemic
