= Mohamed Fahmy =

Mohamed Fahmy (Arabic: محمد فهمي) is a common Arabic name existing under various Latin spellings, it can refer to several people:

- Mohammed Fahmi (Lebanese politician), b. 1958, Lebanese politician
- Mohamed Fahmy (journalist), b. 1974, Egyptian Canadian journalist
