= Robert Koch Institute =

German government agency responsible for disease control and prevention

- Robert Koch Institut
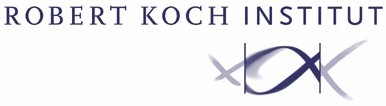

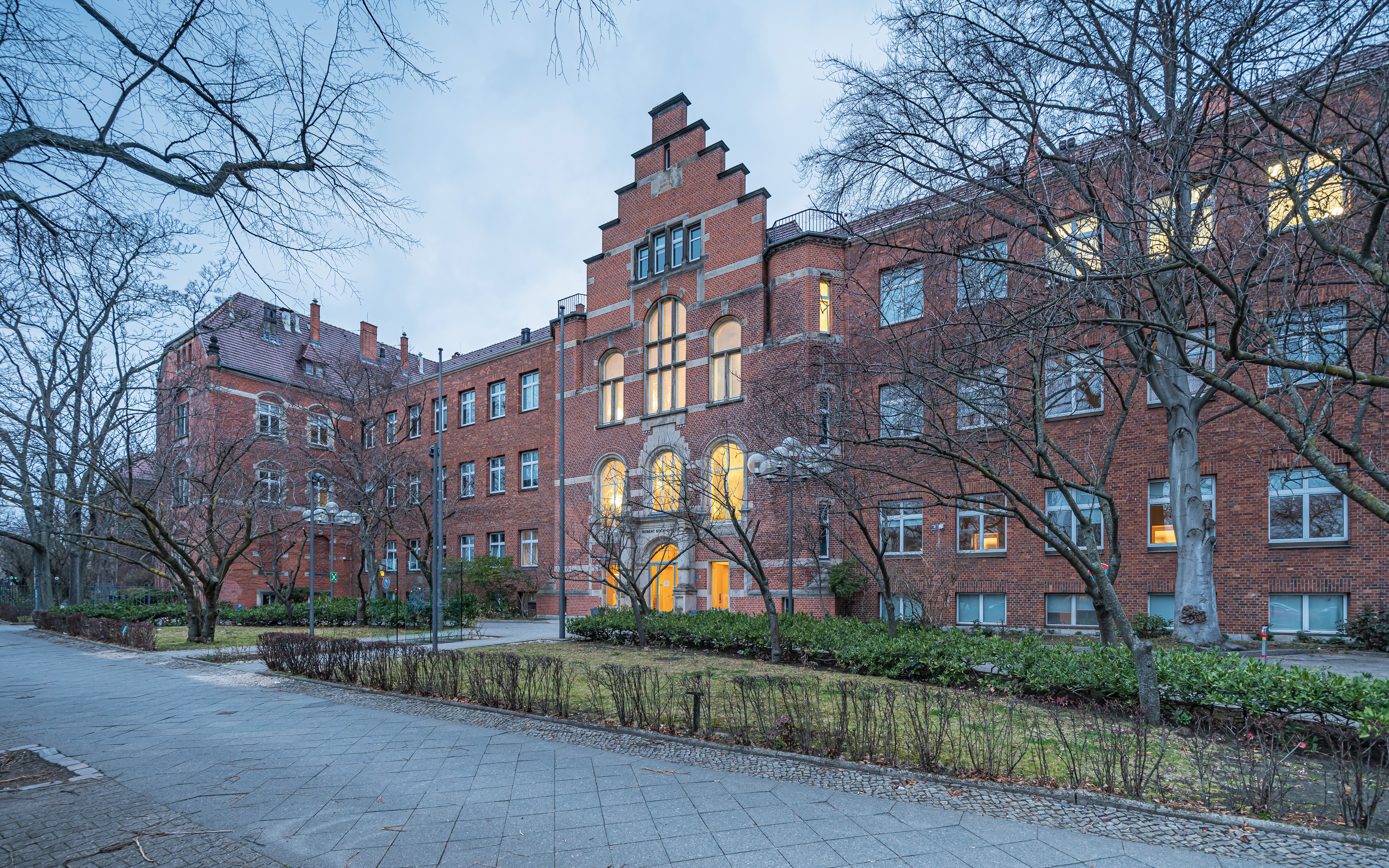
- Founded: 1 July 1891; 135 years ago
- Type: Research institute
- Location: Berlin, Germany
- Region served: Germany
- Owner: German Federal Ministry of Health
- Key people: Lars Schaade (President); Johanna Hanefeld and Anke Engelbert (Acting Vice Presidents)
- Website: www.rki.de/EN

The Robert Koch Institute (RKI) is a German federal government agency and research institute responsible for disease control and prevention. It is located in Berlin and Wernigerode. As an upper federal agency, it is subordinate to the Federal Ministry of Health. It was founded in 1891 and is named for its founding director, the founder of modern bacteriology and Nobel laureate Robert Koch.

== Tasks ==
The Robert Koch Institute monitors public health. Its core tasks include the detection, prevention and combatting of infectious diseases and non-communicable diseases in Germany. The institute advises the specialist public and government, e.g. on preventing and tackling infectious disease outbreaks such as the COVID-19 pandemic, the swine flu pandemic in 2009 and the EHEC O104:H4 outbreak in 2011. The institute is also in charge of health monitoring and health reporting in Germany, covering non-communicable diseases: in large monitoring studies, RKI monitors the health status of adults and children in Germany.

RKI scientists regularly publish their results in scientific journals and in their own reports, e.g. the "Infectious Disease Epidemiology Annual Report", special reports on different diseases in Germany (influenza, tuberculosis, cancer), "Health in Germany". Apart from that, the Institute publishes several scientific periodicals, such as the monthly "Journal of Health Monitoring", "Epidemiological Bulletin" and the "Bundesgesundheitsblatt" (co-publisher). The institute is also home to various National Reference Centres and Consultant Laboratories. Around 15 scientific committees, such as the Standing Committee on Vaccination (STIKO) and the Commission for Hospital Hygiene and Infection Prevention (KRINKO), are also based at the Robert Koch Institute.

RKI staff are involved in various international research projects and programmes, helping to tackle urgent public health problems such as the Ebola outbreak in West Africa in 2011. RKI also cooperates closely with international partners like the European Centre for Disease Prevention and Control (ECDC) and the World Health Organization (WHO). The institute hosts two WHO reference laboratories (polio and measles/rubella) and has been the WHO Collaborating Centre for Emerging Infections and Biological Threats since 2016. RKI is the only federal institute in Germany in the field of human medicine with a BSL-4 laboratory (which was opened in 2015 and has become fully operational in summer 2018).

== Location and organisation ==
The Robert Koch Institute has its headquarters and two additional sites in Berlin (Nordufer, Seestraße, General-Pape-Straße) as well as a site in Wernigerode/Harz region.

RKI's focus is on research, some 450 of about 1,100 members of staff are scientists. The institute consists of the following units.

- Department for Infectious Diseases
- Department for Epidemiology and Health Reporting
- Department for Infectious Disease Epidemiology
- Centre for Biological Threats and Special Pathogens
- Centre for International Health Protection
- Methodology and Research Infrastructure
- Project groups (Immune Defense Mechanisms; Acinetobacter baumanii; Epidemiology of Highly Pathogenic Microorganisms; Epidemiological Modelling of Infectious Diseases; Virulence Factors in Salmonella and Campylobacter)
- Junior research groups (Microbial Genomics; Metabolism of Microbial Pathogens)
- Staff units (e.g. Global Health and Biosecurity; Genetic Engineering)
- Central services (e.g. Human Resources)

A museum presenting the life and work of Robert Koch as well as of the institute today is located at the main building at Nordufer site and open to visitors from Monday to Friday. The mausoleum with Robert Koch's remains can also be visited.

== History ==
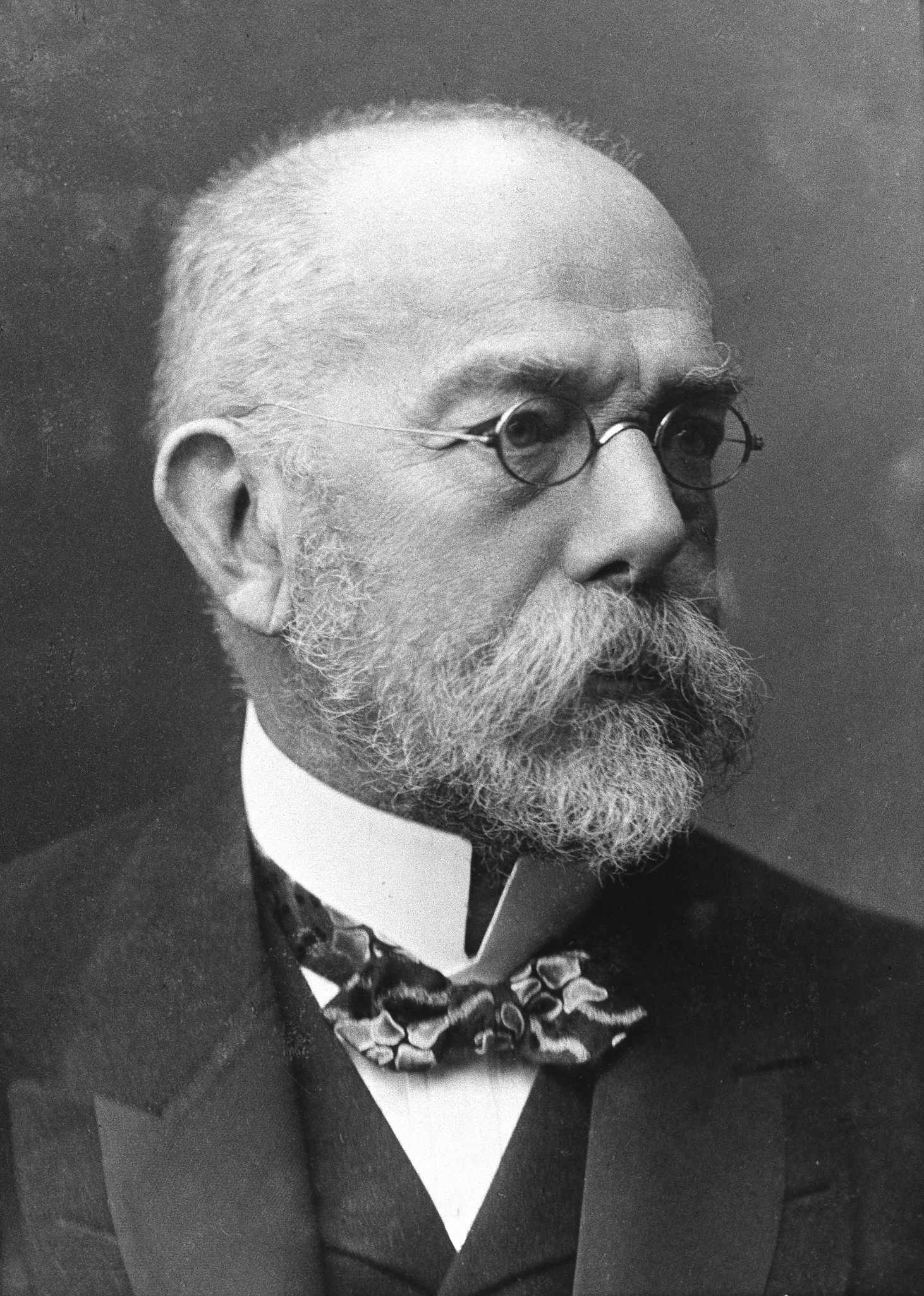
The institute's founding director and namesake, Nobel laureate Robert Koch

The institute was formed by the later Nobel Prize laureate Robert Koch in 1891 as the Royal Prussian Institute for Infectious Diseases. Koch lived until the age of 66, when he died of a heart attack in Baden-Baden, on 27 May 1910; his ashes were buried in a mausoleum in his institute on 10 December 1910. The director from 1917 to 1933 was Fred Neufeld who discovered the pneumococcal types. Neufeld's Deputy Director from 1919 to 1933 was Walter Levinthal.

During the Third Reich, the Institute took part in atrocities committed in the name of national socialism, such as experiments into typhus vaccines at Buchenwald Concentration Camp in 1941, resulting in the deaths of 127 of the 537 inmates involved. The institute was renamed the Robert Koch Institute in 1942. Following the collapse of the Nazi regime, only few scientists ever had to face legal consequences, and their crimes were largely ignored for the remainder of the century.

In 1952 the Institute became a subordinate agency of the Federal Health Agency. Following the German reunification in 1990, some former GDR health agencies were (partly) integrated in the Robert Koch Institute. One of them was the Institute for Experimental Epidemiology in Wernigerode/Harz region, which is still an RKI location today. In 1994, the Federal Health Agency was dissolved, and RKI became an independent federal agency within the portfolio of the German Federal Ministry of Health. Two of the former Federal Health Agency's institutes, the Berlin-based AIDS centre and the "Institut für Sozialmedizin und Epidemiologie" (Institute for Social Medicine and Epidemiology), were attached to the Robert Koch Institute. The RKI – which until then was occupied with infectious diseases alone – now had a second big topic: non-communicable diseases and their risk factors.

In 2020, the institute was responsible for publishing contact tracing smartphone apps as part of the German government's response to COVID-19.

== Presidents ==
Since its inception in 1891, the RKI has had 15 individual presidents.

- Robert Koch (1891–1904)
- Georg Gaffky (1904–1913)
- Friedrich Loeffler (1913–1915)
- Fred Neufeld (1915–1933)
- Friedrich Karl Kleine (1933–1934)
- Richard Otto (1934–1935)
- Eugen Gildemeister (1935–1945)
- Otto Lentz (1945–1949)
- Bruno Harms (1949–1952)
- Georg Henneberg (1952–1969)
- Hansjürgen Raettig, Karl-Ernst Gillert, Hans Kröger, Wilhelm Weise (board of directors) (1970–1984)
- Wilhelm Weise (1985–1990)
- Hans Kröger, Joachim Weltz, Hans Hoffmeister (acting) (1990–1996)
- Reinhard Kurth (1996–2008)
- Jörg Hacker (2008–2010)
- Reinhard Burger (2010–2015)
- Lothar H. Wieler (2015–2023)
- Lars Schaade (2022–)

== Notable people ==
- Robert Koch (1843–1910), German physician and microbiologist. Nobel Prize in medicine or physiology in 1905.
- Paul Ehrlich (1854–1915), Nobel Prize winning physician.
- Emil von Behring (1854–1917), German physiologist. Received the first Nobel Prize for medicine or physiology in 1901.
- August von Wassermann (1866–1925), German bacteriologist and hygienist and developer of the so-called "Wassermann test."
- Claus Schilling (1871–1946), German experimenter in Nazi human concentration camp experiments executed for war crimes, director of the tropical medicine division at the institute.

== See also ==
- List of national public health agencies
- Emmy Klieneberger-Nobel
