= Bassam Mawlawi =

Lebanese politician

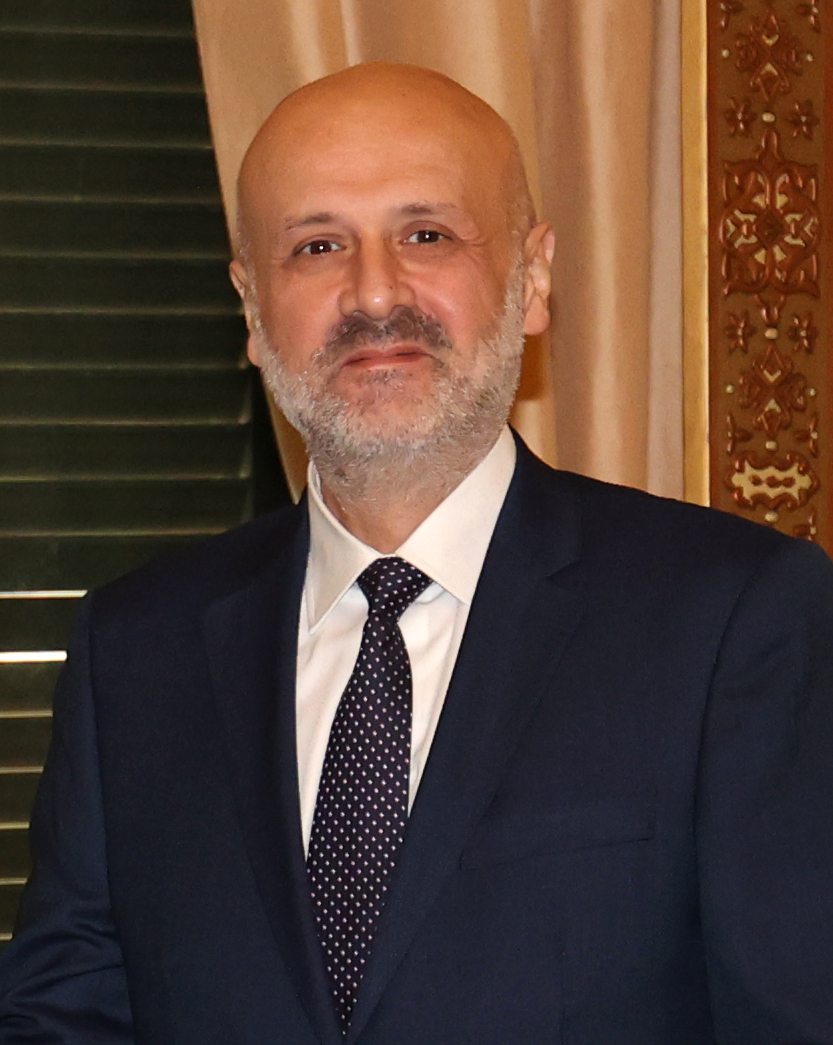
- Mawlawi in 2021

Minister of Interior and Municipalities
- In office 10 September 2021 – 8 February 2025
- President: Michel Aoun; Joseph Aoun
- Prime Minister: Najib Mikati
- Preceded by: Mohammed Fahmi
- Succeeded by: Ahmad al-Hajjar

Personal details
- Party: Azm Movement

Bassam Mawlawi (Arabic: بسام مولوي) is a Lebanese politician who servered as the Minister of Interior and Municipalities of Lebanon in the third government of Najib Mikati between 10 September 2021 and 8 February 2021. Before assuming the position, Mawlawi served as a judge presiding over Beirut's Court of Instance and the North Lebanon Criminal Court.
