= Raya Haffar El Hassan =

Lebanese politician

- ريا الحسن
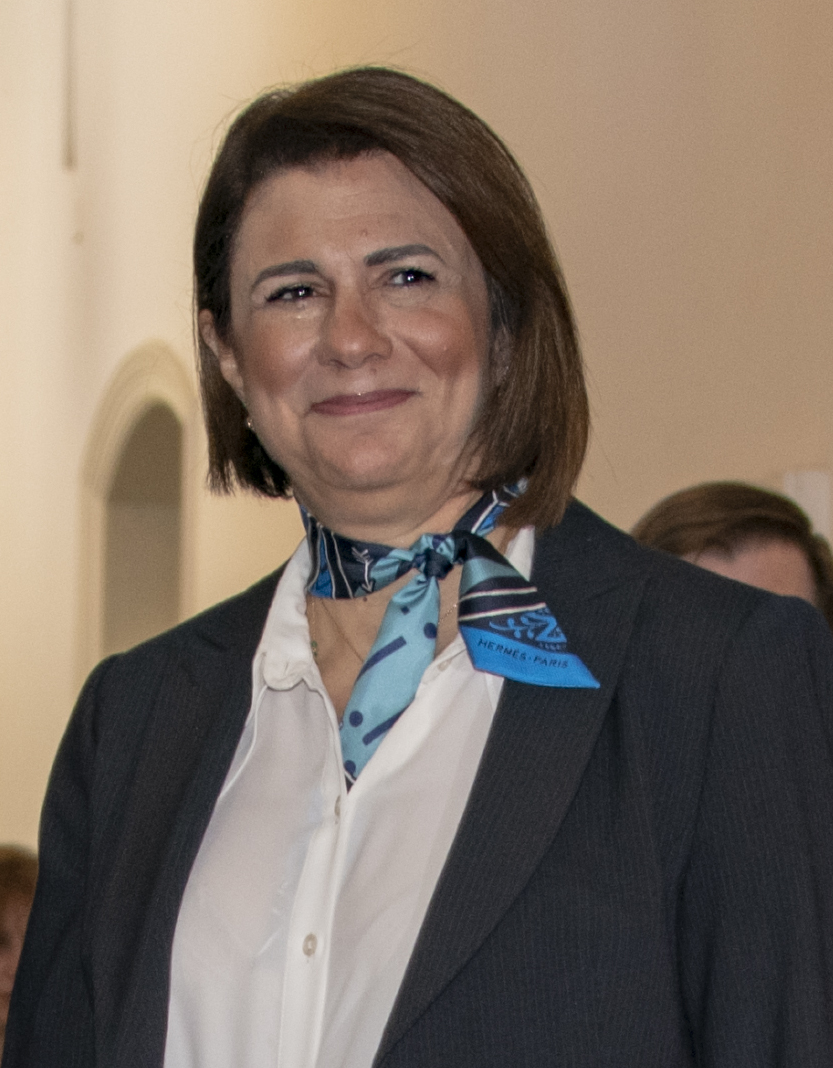
- El Hassan in 2019

Minister of Interior and Municipalities
- In office 31 January 2019 – 21 January 2020
- Prime Minister: Saad Hariri
- Preceded by: Nohad Machnouk
- Succeeded by: Mohammad Fahmi

Minister of Finance
- In office 9 November 2009 – 13 June 2011
- Prime Minister: Saad Hariri
- Preceded by: Mohamad Chatah
- Succeeded by: Mohammad Safadi

Personal details
- Born: 1967 (age 58–59) Tripoli, Lebanon
- Party: Future Movement
- Education: George Washington University

Raya El Hassan (née Haffar, Arabic: ريا الحسن; born January 1967) is a Lebanese politician who held the office of the interior and municipalities ministry, and the finance ministry. She is the first woman in Lebanon to be appointed to these and equivalent posts in the government.

== Early life and education ==
El Hassan was born in January 1967 into a Sunni family. She received a bachelor's degree in business administration from the American University of Beirut in June 1987. She then obtained a Master of Business Administration in finance in investments from George Washington University in 1990.

== Career ==
Early in her career, El Hassan worked with Méditerranée Investors Group. She then served as an advisor to the Minister of Economy and Trade and later worked as a member of the Office of the Prime Minister, leading different projects and supervising expenditure management reforms. Subsequently, El Hassan also worked on reforms, elaborating economic and social reform agendas, for the Prime Minister's office.

Prior to her appointment as Finance Minister, she also worked on other administrating programmes under the auspices of the United Nations Development Programme and the World Bank.

=== Minister of Finance ===
El Hassan was appointed Minister of Finance on 9 November 2009, replacing Mohamad Chatah in the post. Her tenure ended in 2011. She was succeeded by Mohammad Safadi.

=== Minister of Interior and Municipalities ===
El Hassan was appointed Minister of Interior and Municipalities on 31 January 2019, replacing Nohad Machnouk in the post. She was succeeded by Mohammed Fahmi in January 2020.

== Additional affiliations and memberships ==
El Hassan is a member of the March 14 Alliance and an ally of Saad Hariri. In 2016, she served on the advisory board of the Arab Human Development Reports. El Hassan was a member of the board of directors at MedInvestment Bank (BankMed), where she also serves on the audit committee. On 9 Oct. 2020, she was appointed chairperson of the board of directors of BankMed. She is also the chairman and general manager of the Tripoli Special Economic Zone (TSEZ).

== Personal life ==
El Hassan is married to Janah El Hassan. She has three children.

== See also ==
- Lebanese government of November 2009
- Lebanese Parliament
- Members of the 2009-2013 Lebanese Parliament
- Future Movement

Political offices
Preceded by Mohamad Chatah	Minister of Finance; 2009–2011	Succeeded by Mohammad Safadi
