= Walter Levinthal =

German bacteriologist

Dr Walter Michel Levinthal FRSE (1886–1963) was a German-born bacteriologist, working in Britain in the 20th century. He gave his name to Levinthal's Agar. He is known for his work on Psittacosis and the influenza virus.

== Life ==
He was born in Berlin on 12 April 1886. He studied medicine at Berlin, Freiburg and Munich graduating in 1909 and later receiving his doctorate (MD) from Munich. His continuing studies allowed him to avoid conscription during the First World War and in 1919 he joined the Robert Koch Institute in Berlin. He quickly rose to the position of deputy director of the Research Department. In 1922 working with Fred Neufeld, the Director of the institute, he made important advances in molecular biology.

In 1924 he went to the United States and worked in the Rockefeller Institute in New York City. Here he studied pneumococci and the diphtheria bacilli, and became skilled in the cultivation of single cells.

He returned to Berlin where over and above his clinical work he drew the attention of the authorities through his involvement (with his friend Kurt Grossman) in the publication of Die Menschenrechte (1926–1932) for the German League of Human Rights. In 1930 he received the Paul Ehrlich Prize for his work in microbiology and the discovery of Levinthal-Coles-Lillie bodies. In 1933 he was dismissed from the Robert Koch Institute due to his political views. On 15 March he was arrested by the Nazis. Released he decided to flee the country and went to Britain.

His initial stay in London was short. From there we went to Bath, gaining employment at the Centre for the Treatment of Rheumatism (linked to the spas in Bath). From there he moved north to Edinburgh in Scotland around 1935. Here he worked in the laboratory of the Royal College of Physicians of Edinburgh.

In 1942 he was elected a Fellow of the Royal Society of Edinburgh. His proposers were William Frederick Harvey, Sir Stanley Davidson, William Ogilvy Kermack, and Philip Eggleton.

After the Second World War the Robert Koch Institute recognised him as a person who suffered at the hands of the Nazis and awarded him a pension of an emeritus Professor of the institute.

He retired in 1951. He died in Edinburgh on 1963.

== Publications ==
- On the Decomposition of Xanthin and Caffeine in the Organism of Man (1912) (dissertation)
- Recent Observations on Psittacosis (1935)
