= Lars Schaade =

German physician (born 1966)

Lars Schaade (born 1966) is a German physician. He is a specialist in microbiology and infectious disease epidemiology and has been president of the Robert Koch Institute since 2023. He has been an honorary professor at Charité since 2017.

== Life and career ==
From 1985 to 1987, he performed his civilian service in Nienburg. Schaade began studying human medicine at the Georg August University of Göttingen in 1987 and received his doctorate there in 1994; his dissertation thesis was "Isolation and structural analysis of two cytostatically active gangliosides from mouse macrophages".

From 1995 to 1996, Schaade worked as a research associate in the Department of Medical Microbiology at the University of Göttingen, and from 1996 at the Institute of Medical Microbiology at the University Hospital of RWTH Aachen. From 2000 to 2002 he was employed there as a research assistant (teaching and research area virology). In 2000, he passed the examination for specialist in microbiology and infection epidemiology at the Medical Association of North Rhine. 2003 Habilitation in Medical Microbiology and Virology at the Medical Faculty of the RWTH Aachen. From 2002 to 2007, he worked as a consultant in the unit "Communicable Diseases, AIDS, Epidemic Hygiene" at the Federal Ministry of Health, Bonn and Berlin; from 2006, he was deputy head of unit, and from 2007 to 2010, head of unit. From 2010 to 2023 he was department head of the "Center for Biological Hazards and Special Pathogens (ZBS)" and from 2011 to 2023 vice president of the Robert Koch Institute in Berlin. In 2017, he was appointed honorary professor at the Charité in Berlin. Following the retirement of Lothar H. Wieler on April 1, 2023, Schaade was initially acting president of the Robert Koch Institute. He was appointed president of the RKI on October 4, 2023.
