= Atrocity =

Atrocity, Atrocities, or Atrocious may refer to:

- Atrocity crime, a violation of international criminal law involving genocide, war crimes, or crimes against humanity
- Atrocity propaganda, the spreading of information about the crimes committed by an enemy
- Atrocity (band), a German metal band
- Atrocities (album), a 1986 album by Christian Death
- Atrocious (film), a 2010 Spanish film

== See also ==
- Atrocitus, a DC Comics supervillain
- Crimes against humanity
- Cruelty
- Genocide
- War crime
