= Lothar H. Wieler =

German veterinarian and microbiologist (born 1961)

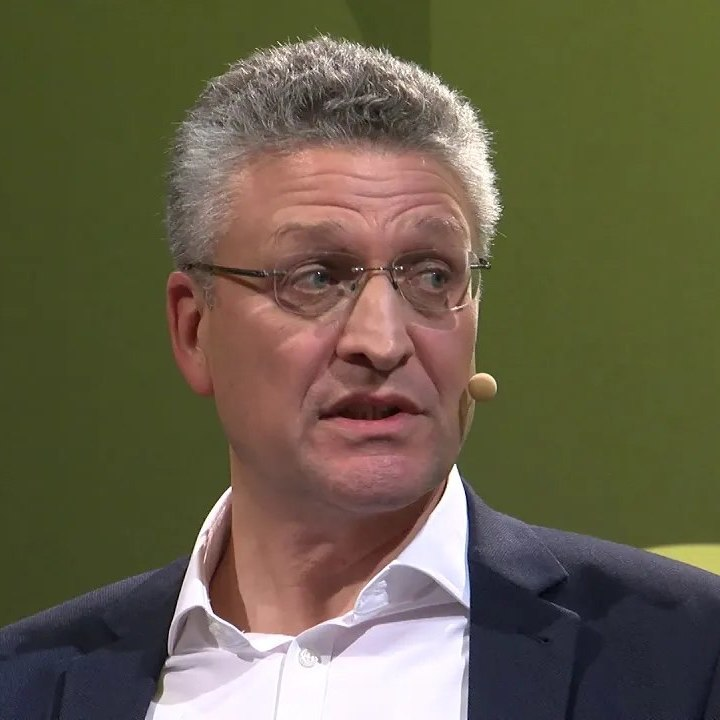
- Born: Lothar Heinz Wieler; 8 February 1961 (age 65); Bonn-Beuel, West Germany (now Germany)
- Scientific career
- Fields: Veterinary medicine; Microbiology
- Website: hpi.de/en/wieler/team/dr-prof-lothar-wieler/

Lothar H. Wieler (born 8 February 1961) is a German veterinarian, microbiologist and global public health expert who served as president of the Robert Koch Institute (RKI) from 2015 to 2023. The RKI is Germany's national public health institute; under the Infection Protection Act it is the national authority for the prevention of communicable diseases, and it acts as scientific advisor to the federal government. During the COVID-19 pandemic he became nationally known for his public analysis of the pandemic's development and served on the federal government's Expert Council on COVID-19. Since 2023 he has held the Chair of Digital Global Public Health at the Hasso Plattner Institute for Digital Engineering (HPI) in Potsdam. He has been a member of the German National Academy of Sciences Leopoldina since 2010.

== Early life and education ==
Wieler was born in Bonn-Beuel, Germany, and grew up in Oberpleis, part of Königswinter, where he attended the Gymnasium am Oelberg; his father was a veterinarian and his mother managed a farm. He studied veterinary medicine at the Free University of Berlin and LMU Munich from 1980 to 1985. After military service in the Bundeswehr from 1986 to 1987, he received his doctorate in 1988 at the Institute of Medical Microbiology, Infection and Epidemic Diseases of LMU Munich. In 1996, he completed his habilitation in infectious diseases and hygiene of animals at the University of Giessen, and in 1997 he was certified as a veterinary specialist in microbiology.

== Career ==
=== Academic career ===
From 1987 to 1990, Wieler worked in the Department of Pathology at Ulm University, and from 1990 to 1998 he was a research assistant at the Institute of Hygiene and Infectious Diseases of Animals at the University of Giessen. In 1996, he spent a research stay at the Center for Vaccine Development of the University of Maryland School of Medicine in Baltimore, in the group of James B. Kaper.

From 1998 to 2015, Wieler was professor and director of the Institute of Microbiology and Epizootics at the Free University of Berlin, where he is also an honorary professor. From 2003 to 2009, he was vice dean for research of the university's Department of Veterinary Medicine. He coordinated the BMBF-funded research network FBI-Zoo (Food-borne Zoonotic Infections of Humans) from 2007 to 2015, and from 2010 to 2016 he was speaker of the International DFG Research Training Group 1673 "Functional Molecular Infection Epidemiology", established jointly with the University of Hyderabad. He was a co-founder of Germany's National Research Platform for Zoonoses, serving on its internal advisory board from 2009 to 2014, and from 2015 he was deputy spokesperson of the research consortium InfectControl 2020, which pursues One Health approaches to preventing and treating infections. From 2011 to 2015, he chaired the scientific advisory committee of the Friedrich Loeffler Institute. During that time, he spent a sabbatical in 2012 at the Wellcome Trust Sanger Institute (now the Wellcome Sanger Institute) in Hinxton under the supervision of Gordon Dougan.

=== Robert Koch Institute (2015–2023) ===
Wieler took office as president of the Robert Koch Institute on 1 March 2015, succeeding Reinhard Burger.

In December 2021, he was appointed to the Expert Council on COVID-19, set up by the Federal Chancellery to advise the federal government on the pandemic.

On 11 January 2023, the Federal Ministry of Health announced that Wieler would step down as president at his own request with effect from 1 April 2023, in order to concentrate on research and teaching; his deputy Lars Schaade took over his duties on an interim basis. Health minister Karl Lauterbach credited him with lasting and outstanding contributions to the country's handling of the pandemic.

=== International advisory roles ===
Since 2018 Wieler has been a member of the World Health Organization's Strategic and Technical Advisory Group for Infectious Hazards (STAG-IH). In 2018 he was also appointed to the European Advisory Committee on Health Research of WHO/Europe, and from 2019 he co-chaired the WHO Working Group on Influenza Preparedness and Response. From September 2020 to 2021 he chaired the WHO Review Committee on the Functioning of the International Health Regulations (2005) during the COVID-19 Response, which reported to the World Health Assembly in May 2021. From March 2020 he was a member of the European Commission's advisory panel on COVID-19. In November 2020 he was appointed to the One Health Global Leaders Group on Antimicrobial Resistance, co-chaired by the prime ministers of Bangladesh, Sheikh Hasina, and Barbados, Mia Mottley.

=== Hasso Plattner Institute (since 2023) ===
In April 2023, Wieler moved to the Hasso Plattner Institute (HPI) in Potsdam, where he served as coordinator of its Digital Health Cluster. He holds the Chair of Digital Global Public Health at HPI and the University of Potsdam, and is an adjunct professor at the Hasso Plattner Institute at Mount Sinai Hospital in New York. He is also co-director of the digital health partnership between HPI and Mount Sinai.

Since December 2022, Wieler has been a member of the Lancet Commission on 21st Century Global Threats to Health, whose report was published in The Lancet in October 2026.

== Research ==
Wieler's research has focused on infectious diseases that can be transmitted between animals and humans, known as zoonoses, with particular emphasis on infections involving multi-resistant bacteria. He has investigated their transmission mechanisms and microevolution, disease-causing factors and disease control strategies, and how bacterial pathogens successfully infect different hosts. His initial university research addressed the molecular pathogenesis, genomic surveillance and evolution of infectious agents, particularly zoonotic pathogens and antibiotic-resistant bacteria, and he later extended his work to disease prevention and the containment of pathogens with epidemic and pandemic potential. He has published more than 250 scientific papers.

At HPI, his chair works on disease prevention and population-level health promotion using data-driven digital applications, with an emphasis on public health communication; its research areas include precision public health and antimicrobial resistance. His stated aim at HPI is to reduce health inequalities by promoting digital global public health at local, national and international levels.

== Other activities ==
- Lancet Commission on 21st Century Global Threats to Health, Commissioner (since 2022)
- German National Academy of Sciences Leopoldina, Acting Senator of the Section Global Health (since 2021); previously Senator of the Section Veterinary Medicine (2016–2021)
- One Health Global Leaders Group on Antimicrobial Resistance, Member (appointed 2020)
- Virchow Foundation for Global Health, Member of the Council
- WHO Strategic and Technical Advisory Group for Infectious Hazards (STAG-IH), Member (since 2018)
- Sciana: The Health Leaders Network, Advisor (since 2024)
- World Health Organization (WHO), Member of the European Advisory Committee on Health Research (appointed 2018)
- Global Research Collaboration for Infectious Disease Preparedness (GloPID-R), Member of the Scientific Advisory Board (2016–2019)
- Federal Ministry of the Interior (Germany), Member of the Protection Commission (Schutzkommission) (2012–2015)
- Federal Ministry of Defence (Germany), Member of the Advisory Council on Military Medicine (Wehrmedizinischer Beirat) (2011–2020)
- German Society for Hygiene and Microbiology (DGHM), Chair of the Zoonoses specialist group (2012–2014)
- Gut Pathogens (journal), Associate Editor (since 2009)

== Honours and awards ==
- 1997 – Young Scientist Award, German Veterinary Medical Society (DVG)
- 2007 – Main Award, German Society for Hygiene and Microbiology (DGHM)
- 2016 – Walter Frei Prize, Vetsuisse Faculty, University of Zurich
- 2021 – Honorary doctorate (Dr. med. vet. h.c.), University of Veterinary Medicine Hannover
- 2021 – Honorary doctorate (Dr. med. vet. h.c.), Vetsuisse Faculty, University of Zurich
- 2021 – Ferdinand Cohn Medal, German Society for Hygiene and Microbiology
- 2021 – Albrecht von Graefe Medal, Berlin Medical Society
- 2021 – Honorary Diplomate, American Veterinary Epidemiology Society
- 2022 – Honorary doctorate (Dr. med. vet. h.c.), LMU Munich
- 2022 – Golden Needle of Honour, Free University of Berlin
- 2024 – Officer's Cross of the Order of Merit of the Federal Republic of Germany, presented by Federal President Frank-Walter Steinmeier on 18 January 2024
