= Mohammed Fahmi (Lebanese politician) =

Lebanese politician

Minister of Interior and Municipalities
- In office 21 January 2020 – 10 September 2021
- President: Michel Aoun
- Prime Minister: Hassan Diab
- Preceded by: Raya El Hassan
- Succeeded by: Bassam Mawlawi

Personal details
- Born: 23 May 1958 (age 68) Beirut, Lebanon
- Party: Independent
- Education: James Madison University

Military service
- Allegiance: Lebanon
- Branch/service: Lebanese Army
- Years of service: 1978–2016
- Rank: Brigadier General
- Battles/wars: Lebanese Civil War

Mohammed Fahmi (Arabic: محمد فهمي; born 23 May 1958 in Beirut) is a Lebanese politician and retired general of the Lebanese Army. He served as the Lebanese Minister of Interior and Municipalities from 21 January 2020 to 10 September 2021. He succeeded Raya El Hassan.

== Background ==
Fahmi was born on 23 May 1958 in Beirut to an Egyptian father and a Lebanese mother from the influential Zein family. He joined the Lebanese army in 1978. He became close to the then head of the Lebanese army general Emile Lahoud (1989–1998) and Jamil Al Sayyed who at the time was second in command of the army's intelligence service. The latter played an important role in his designation as minister of the interior in January 2020. He joined the government of Hassan Diab as an independent.

He held various offices in the Lebanese Army: head of the bomb squad removal unit, head commander of the Mount Lebanon military region, and the security department of the military intelligence services. Fahmi studied at the James Madison University in the United States.

== Controversy ==
On 26 June 2020, Fahmi mentioned in an interview at Al-Manar, that he killed two people in 1981 during the Lebanese Civil War, and Michel Aoun promised to protect him back then. Some analysts wrote that the incident might have happened on 25 November 1978, when Fahmi was a lieutenant officer in the Defense Regiment and Major Michel Aoun was a deputy commander of the First Defense Regiment in Baabda District. However, the victims might have been from the Kataeb Party, after the army decided to install barriers near the Kataeb offices in Haret Hreik. In that same interview he mentioned that the Lebanese people have lost faith in the justice system, as it is corrupted and there is deep involvement of Hezbollah and its FPM allies, that prevent real justice.

Political offices
Preceded by Raya El Hassan	Minister of Interior and Municipalities; 2020–September 2021	Incumbent
