= Mahmoud K. Muftić =

Yugoslav physician

Mahmoud Kamal Muftić
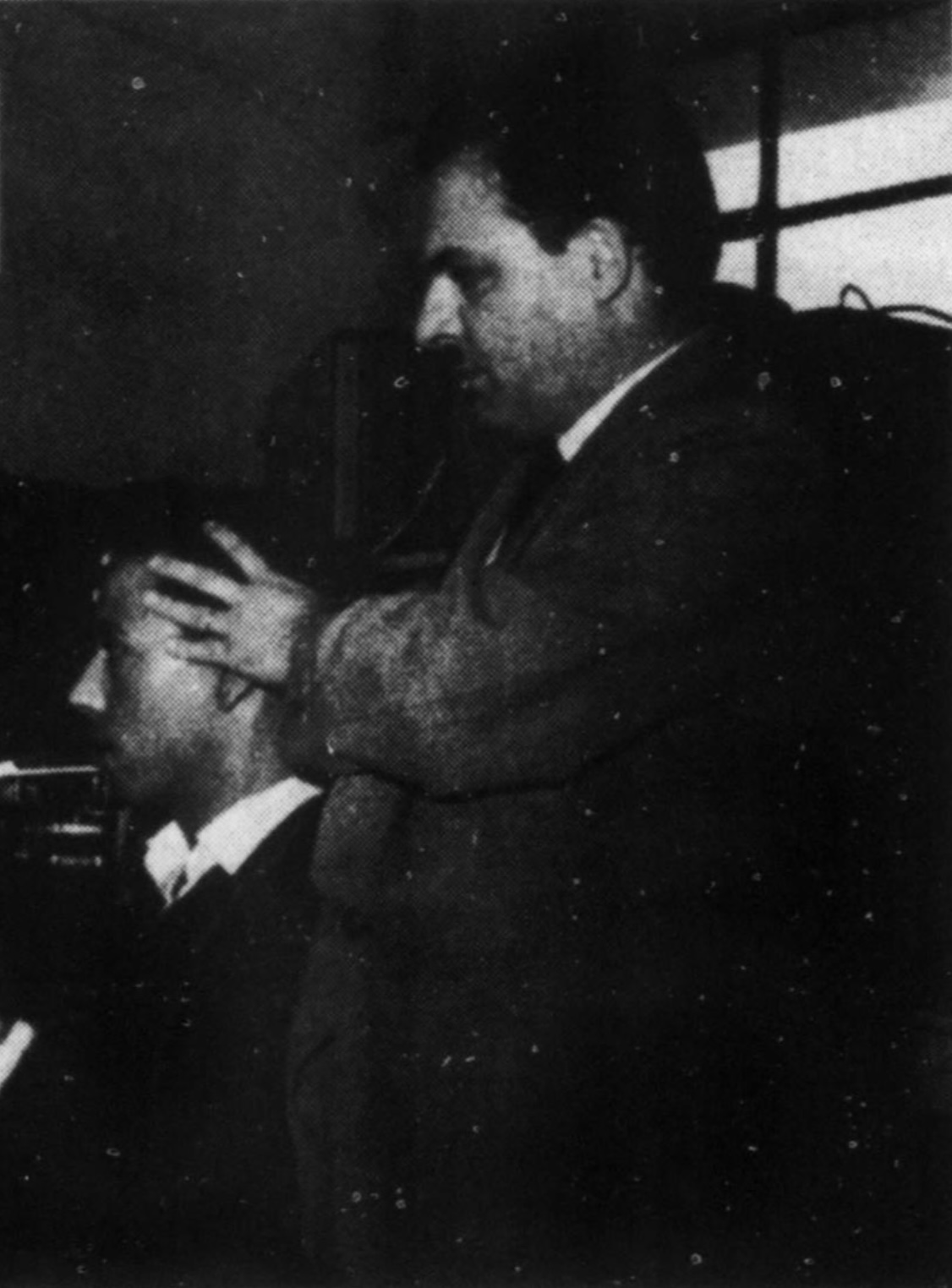
- Mahmoud K. Muftić performing a galvanic skin response (GSR) measurement of the degree of hypnosis using a W-bridge oscillograph according to his own modified method, Iraq, late 1950s
- Born: 14 January 1919; Sarajevo, Yugoslavia (modern-day Bosnia and Herzegovina)
- Died: September 1971 (aged 51–52)
- Other names: Firus mlađi (Firuz the younger, pen name)
- Citizenship: Yugoslavia; Croatia; Egypt (asylum); West Germany (asylum)
- Spouse: Isaad M. Atia
- Scientific career
- Fields: Medical microbiology, enzymology, hypnosis, parapsychology
- Institutions: Tuberculosis Research Institute; Schering AG; University of Lausanne; Trinity College, Dublin
- Author abbrev. (botany): Muftic

Mahmoud Kamal Muftić (or Mahmut Kemal Muftić (Note: His first name appears variously as Mahmoud, Mahmud, or Mahmut. His second name, Kamal or Kemal, is often omitted or abbreviated as the initial "K."); born 14 January 1919 – died September 1971) was a Bosnian Muslim medical researcher and political activist during the Cold War. He worked in biomedical science, combining it with unconventional research into hypnosis and metaphysical topics, and was a key figure bridging pan-Islamist, anti-communist, and Croatian nationalist exile movements. Muftić spent most of his adult life between Europe and the Middle East, involved in exile communities, revolutionary politics, and intelligence networks. He died in 1971 under circumstances that remain unclear, reportedly having claimed to suffer from radioactive poisoning.

Muftić grew up in Sarajevo in a prominent Bosnian Muslim family rooted in Islamic scholarship and the Naqshbandi Sufi tradition. He reportedly earned a medical degree in Zagreb in 1944. Following the collapse of the Independent State of Croatia and the communist takeover of Yugoslavia, he fled the country amid a broader wave of political displacement. By 1948, he had joined the Arab Liberation Army during the Palestine war and was granted asylum in Egypt, marking the start of a twelve-year exile across the Middle East, with periods in Egypt, Iraq, Saudi Arabia, and Palestine. In Egypt Muftić quickly embedded himself in Islamist circles tied to the Muslim Brotherhood, and married a cousin of the Brotherhood's preeminent leader from the 1950s, Said Ramadan. He later moved to West Germany and Switzerland, becoming a director at Schering (now Bayer) in West Berlin. He was living in Dublin at the time of his death.

Between the 1950s and early 1970s, Muftić published extensively on enzymology, immunopathological processes, and disease mechanisms, particularly in relation to tuberculosis, fungal infections, and drug development. At the same time, he pursued research into the biochemical basis of hypnosis alongside more speculative investigations into psychokinesis and aura phenomena. He also wrote on Islamic theology, showing an interest in medical ethics from an Islamic perspective. His work reflected an unusual attempt to bridge conventional medical science with experimental and fringe fields. William Joseph Bryan described Muftić as "a true scientist in every way [who] always looked for physical and chemical explanations of psychological problems. He frequently took as his motto Gerard's famous statement, 'there can be no twisted thought without a twisted molecule.'"

Muftić is best known for his attempt to forge a Cold War alliance between pan-Islamist movements and the Croatian radical nationalist diaspora. As secretary-general of the Croatian National Resistance (HNO), he served as the key link between the Muslim Brotherhood and Croatian émigré networks. In the early 1960s, he launched Operation Orient, a bold campaign of guerrilla diplomacy to form a Croatian government in exile that would be recognized by Arab states and admitted to the Arab League as an Islamic state. In this government he would serve as its envoy to the Arab world, effectively its foreign minister. The initiative collapsed as a result of HNO infighting, and Muftić—suspected by both allies and enemies of intelligence ties—was eventually left politically isolated. The Empire Never Ended podcast episode "Mustasha Brotherhood – The Mahmut Muftić Story" described him as "the enigmatic Ustasha who forged an unlikely alliance between the Muslim Brotherhood and Croatian National Resistance." Despite his efforts to connect worlds that few others ever combined, Muftić ended as a restless and isolated exile, shaped by the shadow conflicts of the Cold War.

== Career ==
=== Early life in Bosnia, 1919–1945 ===
According to World Who’s Who in Science, a source likely based on an autobiographical account, Muftić was born on 14 January 1919 in Sarajevo to Saleh (or Salih) Firuz Muftić and Umihane (or Umihana) Muftić (née Vranić). At the time, Sarajevo had only recently emerged from centuries of Ottoman rule and a decade under Austria-Hungary, and had been incorporated into the newly created Kingdom of Serbs, Croats, and Slovenes just weeks earlier, in December 1918. He belonged to a Bosnian Muslim family with deep roots in religious scholarship and the Sufi tradition. His father was a religious intellectual who wrote on Islamic theological debates under the name “Firuz,” and is likely identical with the Salih Muftić who is mentioned as a real teacher (pravi učitelj) at the Sharia Law School in Sarajevo in 1921–1922. His mother was a respected Islamic educator (muallima) active in Sarajevo during the 1960s and 1970s. The Muftić family from Foča, to which his father belonged, produced multiple generations of Islamic scholars, including sheikhs, muftis, imams, hafiz and teachers, many affiliated with the Naqshbandi Sufi order. They maintained a substantial private collection of manuscripts in Arabic, Ottoman Turkish, and Persian, much of which was acquired by the National Library of Bosnia and Herzegovina in 1960. Mahmoud Muftić was later described as a "a keen student of the Qur'an." While Branimir Jelić writes in his memoirs that a person who had known Muftić for a long time believed he was "born in Sarajevo in 1925 or 1926 and died suddenly around 1975," these dates are likely imprecise and conflict with other sources in regard to both his birth and death year.

According to his apparent autobiography, Muftić graduated as a medical doctor from Zagreb medical school in 1944. As discussed below, a number of political opponents or associates within Yugoslav émigré communities accused him of being a self-styled doctor, but such claims should be read with caution and in the context of Cold War exile politics, where personal attacks and allegations of fraud were common weapons in ideological and personal rivalries. According to Ian Johnson and a variety of other sources, Muftić served, apparently as a doctor, with the Handschar Division.

In the 1930s–1940s, many Bosnian Muslim students who studied in Zagreb were socialized into the Croatian nationalist milieu, which might help explain Muftić’s almost lifelong loyalty to the Croatian national cause, even as many other Bosnian Muslims later developed a distinct Bosniak identity. In the early 20th century, some Bosnian Muslims, especially elites, saw aligning with Croatian nationalism as a way to protect themselves against Serbian political dominance. With Turkey no longer a viable protector and Bosnian independence politically impossible, Croatian nationalists’ promotion of Bosnian Muslims as "Muslim Croats," descendants of medieval Croats who had converted to Islam, offered a political future and social inclusion rather than outsider status. For some Bosnian Muslims, this overture helped to overcome feelings of marginalization after the Ottoman collapse, by allowing them to be embraced as part of a European nation.

=== Postwar years, 1945–1947 ===
According to his apparent autobiography, Muftić worked at the Institute of Hygiene in Zagreb between 1945 and 1947. Other sources have suggested that he found himself as a refugee in Italy after World War II, but it is unclear if he left Yugoslavia in 1945 or 1947. Italy had a significant population of political, religious, and ethnic refugees from Yugoslavia in the immediate postwar years. Bosnian Muslim refugees had then attracted the attention of several Arab countries, who viewed them both as fellow Muslims in need and as experienced veterans. In March 1948, agents from Arab countries were actively recruiting men between the ages of twenty-two and thirty-two for military service in refugee camps in Italy, offering to finance their journey to Arab countries. Amin al-Husseini had a central role in this effort. A significant number of Bosnian Muslims arrived in Arab countries in the immediate postwar years.

=== Palestine War, Egypt, Iraq, Saudi Arabia, 1947/1948–1960 ===
Although the circumstances of Muftić’s departure from Yugoslavia are uncertain, it is clear that he had reached Egypt no later than 1948. In Egypt Muftić quickly embedded himself in Islamist circles tied to the Muslim Brotherhood. Muftić volunteered for service in the Arab Liberation Army in the Palestine war, where he served as a military doctor. He likely met Said Ramadan, the commander of the Muslim Brotherhood unit, during the Palestine War. Ian Johnson wrote that Muftić also had ties to Amin al-Husseini.

On 22 June 1952 Muftić married Isaad Mohammed Atia, (Note: Often known as Isaad M. Atia; also Isaad Atia-Muftić after marriage. The Egyptian Directory of the United Arab Republic lists her as "Isaad Mohd. Atia (Dr).") a medical doctor and anaesthesiologist from a prominent Egyptian family with an interest in hypnosis. They co-authored two articles on hypnosis: The article "Hypnosis in the psychosomatic investigation of female homosexuality" in the British Journal of Medical Hypnotism in 1957, and the article "A new induction method: electrohypnosis" in the Journal of the American Society of Psychosomatic Dentistry & Medicine in 1969. She also published in the Journal of the American Institute of Hypnosis after his death. Isaad Atia was already a doctor when the 1957 article was published; a 1973 article listed her credentials as "M.B., B.Ch., D.A." (that is, a medical doctor with a Diploma in Anaesthesia). They had one son, Nejad Muftić.

In Egypt, Muftić became a close and long-time confidant of Said Ramadan, who, according to several sources, was a cousin of his wife. Said Ramadan emerged as a major leader of the Muslim Brotherhood in the 1950s, following the assassination of its founder, and his father-in-law, Hassan al-Banna.

Between the late 1940s and the early 1960s he worked for a number of research institutes and hospitals in Saudi Arabia, Egypt, Iraq and Palestine. As of 1949 he worked for the Biological Laboratories of Saudi Arabia in Jeddah. As of 1953 he worked for the mycological section of AMA Laboratories in Heliopolis, Cairo.

Before 1955 he moved to Iraq, where he worked at the Middle Euphrat Hospital in Kufa around 1955, then at King Faisal Hospital in Nasiriyah around 1956–1957 and finally at the Royal Hospital in Basra around 1957–1958. In Iraq he was able to continue his research with support from the Iraqi Ministry of Health. Following the 1958 14 July Revolution that overthrew the Hashemite monarchy in Iraq he returned to Egypt to work for the Galenus Pharmaceutical Laboratories in Giza near Cairo. In 1960 he was based in Gaza in Palestine, at the time part of the United Arab Republic.

It is unclear whether his frequent relocations were related to the conflict between the Egyptian government and the Muslim Brotherhood, that led many members of the brotherhood to seek sanctuary in Saudi Arabia, among them Said Ramadan. The Muslim Brotherhood's founder, Hassan al-Banna, reportedly a distant relative of Muftić's wife, was assassinated by the Egyptian secret police in 1949. Muftić was reportedly at one point accused of being a Soviet spy—or rather, a KGB asset—when living in Iraq. Both his opponents and associates repeatedly accused him of having ties to various intelligence services, from the Palestine War in the late 1940s and throughout the 1960s, and Vjekoslav Luburić claimed Muftić had admitted to him that he worked for British intelligence.

=== West Berlin, Lausanne/Geneva, London, Dublin 1960–1971 ===
During the 1950s and 1960s Egypt and Syria moved in a socialist direction, and as a result West Germany decided to accept political refugees from these countries. Thousands of Arab students and scholars moved to West Germany in the 1950s and 1960s. According to his biography, Muftić moved to West Germany in 1960 to work for the Tuberculosis Research Institute (Research Center Borstel) in Schleswig-Holstein. From 1962 to 1964 he worked at the Institute of Bacteriology, Hygiene, and Parasitology at the University of Lausanne. His private address, as published in his articles, remained a P.O. box in Lausanne or Geneva throughout the 1960s, even as he worked in other countries. His relocation to Europe, to West Germany and Switzerland, appeared to follow the path of Said Ramadan.

In 1964 or 1965 he succeeded German bacteriologist Armin Kutzsche as director of Schering's (now Bayer) microbiological department in West Berlin; they co-invented a 1966 patent for carboxylic acid esters, whose tranquilizing properties Muftić would later explore in hypnosis-related research, in a paper published shortly before his death. He is mentioned as late as 1967 and 1968 as holding the position. Schering’s microbiological department had been established by Hans Aronson in 1893, and was one of Germany's leading microbiological research centers. At the time, it was conducting research on tuberculosis, antibiotic resistance, and microbial enzymes, fields with significant importance for Cold War-era public health and biodefense priorities. He also continued to be affiliated with the Biochemical Laboratory at the University of Lausanne.

What happened afterward is not entirely clear, but Muftić appears to have left Schering toward the end of the 1960s, after surviving an earlier assassination attempt by Yugoslav agents in 1963, conflicts within the Muslim Brotherhood and Croatian National Resistance in the mid-1960s, and becoming the target of what has been described as a honey trap, as discussed below.

Less information is available about his final years. Two 1969 letters by the Society of Metaphysicians in the United Kingdom, published in a 1970 thesis titled The Human Aura, stated that Muftić had sustained radioactive poisoning and did not wish to be contacted, except through the Society, in response to inquiries about his aura research. The letters also noted that it had been "some years since we have heard from the good doctor," recalling that Muftić had previously visited the Society in England with his wife, and claimed that he had been "warned off" further research into esoteric topics. It appears that he spent time in the United Kingdom and Ireland; Branimir Jelić wrote that Muftić appeared to live alternately in Berlin and London in the 1960s, while Mišur noted his contact with Bosniaks gathered around Juraj Krnjević in London. His trail ends in Dublin, where he was affiliated with the Biochemistry Department at Trinity College at the time of his death. His wife remained in Dublin and worked as a doctor in the following years.

== Research ==
Muftić’s scientific work spanned mainstream biomedical research as well as more speculative fields. Between the early 1950s and 1970s, he published extensively on enzymology, immunopathological processes, and disease mechanisms, particularly in relation to tuberculosis, fungal infections, and drug development. At the same time, he pursued research into the biochemical basis of hypnosis and carried out speculative studies in metaphysics and parapsychology, including investigations of psychokinesis and human energy fields. His interest in both conventional science and alternative systems of thought reflected the mid-20th century's spirit of intellectual openness and interdisciplinary experimentation. William Joseph Bryan described Muftić as "a true scientist in every way [who] always looked for physical and chemical explanations of psychological problems. He frequently took as his motto Gerard's famous statement, 'there can be no twisted thought without a twisted molecule.'"

=== Microbiology and drug research ===
Muftić's mainstream biomedical research output includes over 50 peer-reviewed papers, primarily published in Western medical journals, along with several patents. His biomedical work centered on enzymes, immune responses, and disease mechanisms, themes that ran through much of his scientific career.

He began his scientific career working on Mycobacterium tuberculosis, focusing particularly on bacterial enzymes and resistance mechanisms. His most notable contributions involved the discovery and pharmacological study of cerase, a wax-decomposing enzyme he linked to the virulence and treatment of tuberculosis. His research in this area centered on bacterial metabolism and diagnostic methods at a time when tuberculosis remained a major global health crisis.

In parallel with his tuberculosis work, Muftić pursued clinical innovation in ear, nose, and throat (ENT) medicine, publishing on Ménière’s disease, otosclerosis, otomycoses, and chronic otitis media, and introducing surgical tools and hemostatic techniques that reflected mid-century trends toward integrating laboratory research with clinical practice.

By the late 1950s, he expanded into medical mycology, describing the yeast-like species Blastomyces cerolytica and developing biochemical assays to characterize fungal and bacterial enzymes, including catalases, peptidases, and amidases. He contributed to efforts to refine microbial taxonomy through enzyme profiling, part of a broader scientific shift from morphology-based to biochemical and molecular identification. His author abbreviation in botany is "Muftic."

In the 1960s, Muftić increasingly focused on drug discovery, working on antimicrobial and antiparasitic compounds, including nitrofuran derivatives, polyenes, and abietyl-based agents. He co-authored multiple patents targeting novel treatments for tuberculosis, fungal infections, and schistosomiasis. His work reflected the Cold War-era boom in natural product chemistry and pharmaceutical innovation.

=== Hypnosis, metaphysics, and parapsychology ===
Muftić maintained a sustained interest in hypnosis, psychosomatic medicine, and metaphysical phenomena. Beginning in the 1950s, he investigated the biochemical basis of hypnosis, focusing on physiological mechanisms such as skin conductivity and chemical modulation of mental states. This line of research aligned with contemporary efforts to ground psychological phenomena in measurable biological processes. Alongside these investigations, Muftić pursued highly speculative theories, including psychokinetic models of hypnosis influenced by Rosicrucian metaphysics. His hypnosis-related work thus spanned the spectrum from experimental science to metaphysical speculation. Muftić was a fellow of the American Institute of Hypnosis, and the organization’s founder, William Joseph Bryan—a military psychiatrist known as one of the pioneers of modern hypnotherapy and Cold War-era psychological warfare, and for his involvement in Project ARTICHOKE and MKUltra—described Muftić in a 1971 obituary as his "longtime personal and professional friend." Bryan and Muftić toured Europe to lecture on hypnosis in 1966. After Muftić’s death, Bryan republished some of his earlier articles on Islamic theology in his hypnosis journal, such as "The Qur'an on the Cause of the Fall of Man," originally published in The Islamic Review in 1969.

In 1957, Muftić and his wife Isaad M. Atia co-authored "Hypnosis in the psychosomatic investigation of female homosexuality," which explored how hypnotic suggestion could be used to uncover sexual tendencies, both homosexual and heterosexual, through fictional contact scenarios. They specifically studied Muslim women who were homosexual, trying to understand their sexual orientation and how it might relate to societal roles these women play. Their findings pointed to the idea that secondary social roles in their communities may influence or correlate with their sexual orientation.

In 1959, as part of his more speculative explorations, Muftić published "A Contribution to the Psychokinetic Theory of Hypnotism" in the British Journal of Medical Hypnotism, where he proposed that hypnotic phenomena might originate from psychokinetic interactions, challenging conventional psychological models. In correspondence with AMORC (Ancient Mystical Order Rosae Crucis), Muftić described these ideas as a major departure from established theories, attributing his new perspective to his engagement with Rosicrucian studies. While living in Egypt, Muftić had become a member of AMORC’s Cairo Chapter, reflecting his developing interest in Rosicrucianism and metaphysical studies.

In his 1961 article "The Chemistry of Hypnosis," Muftić explored the idea that hypnotic states might have a biochemical basis. In 1955, he conducted experiments in Basra, Iraq, transfusing blood from hypnotized patients into non-hypnotized subjects to test whether symptoms like catalepsy, anesthesia, and depersonalization could be transferred. He believed a chemical, "substance M," might be responsible, comparing its effects to mescaline intoxication and acute schizophrenia. At the time, informed consent was not yet a widely enforced standard, especially outside Western countries; Muftić noted that his patients "had no idea of the research concerned." Research environments in places like Iraq offered European-trained physicians wide latitude to conduct experimental studies with minimal oversight, reflecting both the paternalistic medical culture of the time and the looser regulation typical in postcolonial and Cold War-era settings. His work reflects a moment when researchers were beginning to seek chemical explanations for mental states, an approach now foundational in neuroscience and psychiatry. Though his methods, especially the use of blood transfusion, are seen today as scientifically flawed and ethically unacceptable, the study captures a transitional period in postwar medicine when bold, sometimes reckless experimentation drove efforts to understand the mind in biological terms. The underlying premise, that hypnosis might involve transferrable biochemical agents, echoes early CIA-funded efforts like MKUltra and ARTICHOKE, which pursued chemical and neurological methods to control behavior. Muftić’s experiments suggest that similar lines of inquiry were emerging independently outside the U.S., anticipating what would later be called the biochemical or neurochemical basis of consciousness. The article also includes one of the few known photographs of Muftić, using a W-bridge oscillograph according to a modified GSR measurement method he had developed.

In 1969, Muftić and Atia introduced the concept of "electrohypnosis", a technique combining electrical stimulation with hypnotic induction, which they argued achieved deeper hypnotic states.

In his 1971 article, "Influence of subcutaneous application of trans-3-methyl-2-hexanoic acid on induction of hypnosis," Muftić explored the potential hypnotic effects of this compound. This study aligns with his earlier work at Schering AG with colleagues Kutzsche and Peissker, where he co-developed a patent for carboxylic acid esters exhibiting both antifungal and tranquilizing properties. His continued interest in the central nervous system (CNS) activity of such compounds reflects a broader scientific trend during the mid-20th century, where researchers investigated the sedative and hypnotic potential of carboxylic acid derivatives. For instance, studies have demonstrated that certain carboxylic acid metabolites can modulate GABAA receptor activity, leading to hypnotic effects.

Muftić also pursued metaphysical research on human energy fields. During the 1950s, Muftić came into contact with the British Society of Metaphysicians and its self-described founder-president, John Williamson, (Note: John Jacob Williamson (1918–2012) founded the Society of Metaphysicians in 1944, during World War II, after giving a series of lectures on "the new metaphysics" while serving as a radio instructor in the Royal Air Force (RAF) at Cranwell, Lincolnshire. These lectures, later published as The Cranwell Lectures, formed the basis for what he later called "neometaphysics." In 1947, Williamson and several members established a headquarters at Archers' Court in Hastings, Sussex, where they also operated a guest house and other small businesses to support the community. Working amid the dangers of World War II, with radio transmission and radar newly revealing invisible forces in the world, some in Williamson’s generation found it plausible that hidden energies — even within the human body — might have scientific foundations. Building on this outlook, Williamson began research in the 1950s into human energy fields, engaging with and expanding ideas first developed by Walter John Kilner. He came into contact with Muftić, who was still living in Cairo, and later supported Muftić's study on aura phenomena.) joining the Society and participating in its research into parapsychological phenomena. As a young man during World War II, Williamson had served as a radio instructor in the RAF, where the dangers of air warfare and the marvels of new technologies like radio and radar helped spark his lifelong curiosity about invisible forces. During the 1950s, Williamson began exploring human energy fields, building on earlier ideas first proposed by Walter John Kilner. With support from Williamson and the Society’s Metaphysical Research Group, Muftić undertook experimental research aimed at detecting the human aura electronically. Using a custom-built device called an "optron," which combined a semiconductor with an electroluminescent panel, he reported a series of successful experiments that sought to make the aura visible through technological means. His findings were seen within the Society as a major step toward substantiating earlier work by Kilner and others, and they culminated in his 1960/1961 publication Researches on the Aura Phenomena. A second edition was published in 1970, and the book was republished in 1998. Williamson mentions that Muftić had provided data in his own 1954/1957 publication Seeing the Aura, referring to Muftić as "M.S.M.(P.)," which likely stands for "Member of the Society of Metaphysicians (Practitioner)."

His interest in hypnosis and metaphysical topics reflected mid-20th century openness to unconventional research. From the early Cold War period, hypnosis and other paranormal phenomena were studied by researchers under programs funded or supported by government agencies, often linked to psychological warfare and intelligence objectives.

== Cold War shadow politics ==
Muftić’s political engagement unfolded in the margins of Cold War geopolitics, where pan-Islamist, nationalist, and anti-communist movements frequently intersected. Active in both the Muslim Brotherhood’s international networks and Croatian émigré circles, he worked to connect Islamic and nationalist causes through shared opposition to Yugoslavia and the Soviet bloc. His most audacious initiative, known as Operation Orient, aimed to secure Arab League recognition for a future Islamic Croatia led by the Croatian National Resistance (HNO) through a campaign of guerrilla diplomacy across the Middle East. The project exemplified Muftić’s broader approach: forming unconventional alliances across ideological lines in pursuit of revolutionary goals. What followed was a whirlwind of revolutionary maneuvering, secret negotiations, espionage scandals, and ideological betrayal that left Muftić increasingly isolated.

=== The Muslim Brotherhood and Cold War Islamism ===
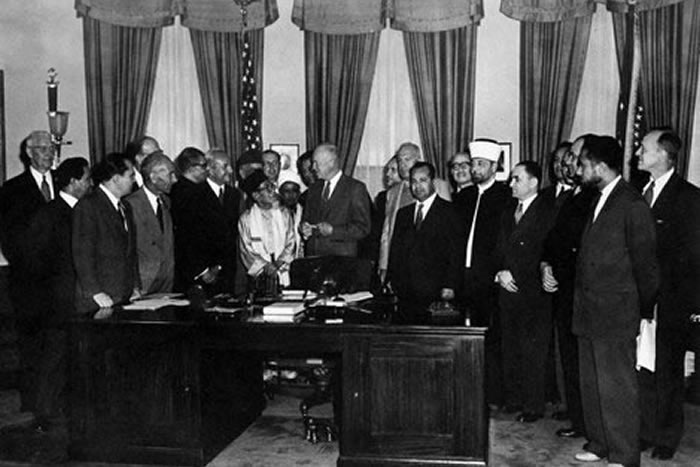
Said Ramadan, pictured (second from right) in the Oval Office with US President Dwight D. Eisenhower in 1953, was Muftić's close confidant and his wife's cousin, and both Ramadan and Muftić were linked to CIA operations in the Muslim world

Muftić became involved with the Muslim Brotherhood during his years in Egypt, largely through his marriage to a cousin of Said Ramadan, the Brotherhood’s de facto international leader and a known U.S. intelligence asset. Through this connection, Muftić aligned with the Brotherhood’s pan-Islamist vision, an agenda that overlapped with Western anti-communist goals during the Cold War. He contributed articles to various outlets that closely mirrored CIA messaging. Said Ramadan sent Muftić in his place to represent the Muslim Brotherhood at the World Muslim Congress in Iraq in 1962, because Ramadan feared for his own security as the congress was sponsored by Abdul-Karim Qasim, the Iraqi dictator who was steering a pro-Soviet course. Muftić was also involved with the Deutsche Muslim-Liga in West Germany.

=== Operation Orient and the HNO ===
Muftić joined the executive of the Croatian National Resistance (HNO) in 1960, rising to General Secretary according to Branimir Jelić. His strategic vision would soon lead HNO into one of the most unusual episodes in the history of Croatian émigré politics: a formal alliance with the Muslim Brotherhood aimed at securing Arab recognition of an independent Croatian Islamic state. This initiative, eventually codenamed "Operation Orient," would culminate in Muftić’s bold plan to gain entry into the Arab League as the exiled government of a future Islamic Croatia.

This unlikely alliance was made possible by Muftić’s personal ties to Islamist networks. His marriage to a cousin of Said Ramadan, the Muslim Brotherhood’s de facto international leader, gave him rare access to the movement’s highest circles. According to Ivo Mišur, "Muftić and his wife (Said Ramadan’s cousin) were the connection between these two organizations." Mišur adds that it is unclear whether Muftić adopted Croatian nationalism to serve Islamist goals or the reverse, suggesting that he strategically blurred ideological lines to advance both causes.

Mišur documents that Muftić served as the primary architect of these efforts, which targeted Arab countries, especially Saudi Arabia, to secure recognition and support "for the fight against communism and for the liberation of Croatia." The campaign, codenamed "Operation Orient" and later "Jordanija," included a propaganda offensive led through the Brotherhood-affiliated magazine Drina. A 300-page special issue in Arabic and Croatian praised King Hussein of Jordan and pan-Islamic solidarity. By the early 1960s, the HNO was in negotiation with five or six Arab states, confirmed among them were Saudi Arabia, Jordan, and Yemen. Vjekoslav Luburić described the alliance's purpose as creating interest in the Croatian cause "among the 400 million Muslims in the world," believing that armed liberation at home required first building an "outer front of resistance in the world."

In parallel with the diplomatic push, Muftić sought to transform HNO from an exiled political front into a movement with real military strength. He proposed sending Bosnian Muslim volunteers to fight alongside the monarchist forces of Muhammad al-Badr in the North Yemen Civil War, a gesture meant to cement the Brotherhood alliance and prove Croatia’s commitment to the Islamic world’s anti-communist struggles. Although training camps were established, the plan was derailed when Luburić withdrew support. Frustrated Brotherhood operatives reportedly complained that "the grass was growing" in the unused camps.

As negotiations intensified, Muftić and the Saudi consul in West Germany outlined a bold plan: Saudi Arabia would recognize the HNO as Croatia’s legitimate Islamic government at the upcoming Arab League summit in 1964, on the condition that Luburić be replaced by a Muslim, Ibrahim Pirić-Pjanić. Juraj Krnjević was to be named Prime Minister; Pirić-Pjanić, Minister of War; Muftić, the movement’s envoy to the Arab world, in effect its foreign minister, given how Arab countries were the only countries that would realistically recognize this government in the foreseeable future. Muftić visited Pirić-Pjanić with the Saudi consul and agreed on the details of Croatia's international recognition in the Arab world; the final negotiations were scheduled to take place in Riyadh.

The plan fell apart in mid-1964. Luburić, infuriated at the demand to step down, accused Muftić of being a British "spy" and claimed he had privately confessed to working for British intelligence. He accused Muftić of being driven by foreign agendas, especially "English oil interests" tied to al-Badr’s cause. Muftić responded by describing Luburić as a strange fellow who confused desire with reality, an irritable and unsettled man, mentally ill, "sometimes more, sometimes less," and "an infantile revolutionary."

Muftić’s alliance with the Brotherhood also began to unravel. According to Mišur, Said Ramadan distanced himself from Muftić in July 1964 after learning that Muftić's mistress was allegedly the wife of a Yugoslav UDBA agent. Muftić, for his part, blamed American interference, alleging that U.S. intelligence was pressuring Ramadan to avoid actions that would benefit Croatian nationalist aims.

=== Disillusionment and later years in the diaspora ===
Determined to destroy Yugoslavia, Muftić consistently pushed for action and sought unconventional alliances, scorning the emigration’s endless disputes. According to Branimir Jelić's memoirs, completed by Jere Jareb, Muftić also maintained contacts with Croatian communists in the homeland. In a letter in the early 1960s, Muftić expressed his disappointment that, in his view, Croatian communists were more actively engaged in the destruction of Yugoslavia than the nationalist emigration. According to Jelić, Muftić remarked: "While we should be happy that Yugoslavia is being dismantled by Croatian communists, we are still concerned that they are more active in bringing down Yugoslavia than the nationalist emigration. The emigration is too busy with mutual arguments and endless disputes, while the Croatian communists are seriously working on the separation of Croatia from Yugoslavia." He claimed that many influential party officials in Croatia had already begun acting outside the regime’s control, attempting to restructure party cells and shift from the "Yugoslav course" toward a disintegration of the country. Among these "deviationists," Muftić included General Ivan Gošnjak, head of the Counterintelligence Service (KOS).

Jelić and Jareb write that "Muftić cooperated with the Hrvatska Država, signing notifications for the HNO until December 1966, and, as can be seen from Hrvatska Država, resided alternately in Berlin and London. From January 1967, his name and cooperation no longer appeared in Hrvatska Država, although it was not announced that he had resigned from his duties as the General Secretary of the HNO, nor that he had been dismissed. (...) Muftić, as far as I know, was active in Croatian émigré politics from 1960 to 1966, initially cooperating with General Vjekoslav Luburić and later with Dr. Jelić. Before 1960, his name does not appear in Croatian émigré circles. After 1966, he occasionally wrote articles in the émigré press. Professionally, he was a physician specializing in psychiatry. According to information from someone who had known him for many years, Mahmud Muftić was born in Sarajevo in 1925 or 1926 and died suddenly around 1975. (Note: These dates are in all likelihood imprecise) That person described him as a con artist of grand style with shady connections to various intelligence services and did not believe that he ever completed his studies or earned a doctorate."

After he withdrew from the Croatian National Resistance, Muftić stopped advocating pro-Ustaša views and began aligning more closely with other Bosnian Muslims. Mišur writes that his eventual "loss of interest in Croatian political ideas was a consequence of his conflict with Luburić, but also of his contact with Bosniaks, gathered around the president of the Croatian Socialist Party (HSS) Juraj Krnjević in London, who during the 1960s turned exclusively to Bosniakism."

== Controversies ==
Muftić was a polarizing figure, and accusations against him abounded. While Muftić was a Bosnian Muslim, and in modern terms would have been considered a Bosniak, members of the Bosniak movement claimed he had betrayed Bosniak interests for both Croatian nationalism and pan-Islamism, and routinely referred to him as a complete fraud or in similar terms. Šefki-beg Muftić, (Note: Šefki-beg Muftić (also Šefkija or Shawkat Muftić) was a former Ustaša officer who took part in the Palestine war as commanding officer of a Bosnian volunteer battalion, becoming one of the most prominent Yugoslav émigrés in the Levant. He lived in Beirut and had close ties to the Lebanese Army.) an exiled Bosniak anti-communist in Beirut who on this occasion signed himself as "commander from the Palestinian war," wrote that Mahmut Muftić during the 1947–1948 Palestine War had stolen medicine in Lebanon intended for wounded and ill soldiers, and that he spread panic and fear of the enemy, "clearly working for various intelligence agencies", and emphasized that he was "in no way related to the forger and self-proclaimed doctor Mahmut Muftić." Šefki-beg Muftić asserted that Mahmut Muftić wrote slanderous articles against Bosniaks in the Croatian press, signing them with false names such as "Major Dizdar" and "Firus the Younger."

Another article called Muftić a "communist agent" who "poses as a doctor," and who "managed to infiltrate various organizations and use them for his own goals". The article explained Muftić's pen name "Firuz the younger" by noting that his father had published works on Arabic religious debates under the pen name "Firuz." One Bosniak writer called him "a fraud [who] particularly stands out, a former ‘medical student’ who presents himself as a doctor and medical major of the Lebanese army, as well as a major in Luburić's Detachment." In another letter, "Firuz the Younger"'s articles were denounced as "always completely false and, in most cases, stupid," and described as the writings of "a dubious person" engaged in "a dishonest and suspicious campaign."

=== Alleged post-Arab–Israeli War arms trafficking ===
Political opponents accused Muftić of involvement in arms trafficking in the aftermath of the 1947–1948 Arab–Israeli War, during his time with the Muslim Brotherhood in Egypt. After the war, a large quantity of captured Arab military equipment fell into Israeli hands, and much of it was resold through black-market and gray-market arms deals, which was very common in the chaotic postwar period. At the same time, the Muslim Brotherhood, facing repression by the Egyptian state, urgently needed weapons, funding, and international contacts. These accusations apparently formed the basis for later claims by Muftić's political enemies that he had cooperated with Mossad. However, Muslim involvement in postwar arms markets did not necessarily imply collaboration with Israel; rather, it reflected the murky world of black-market trade, intelligence operations, and underground political movements at the time.

=== Question over doctorate ===
According to his apparent autobiography, Muftić graduated as a medical doctor from the Zagreb Medical School in 1944, when he was around 25 years old. He served as a doctor during the Palestine War and subsequently worked as a doctor and biomedical researcher across the Middle East from the late 1940s onward, followed by a high-level biomedical career in Western Europe, culminating in his appointment as a director at Schering in the 1960s. He began publishing scientific papers in 1951, authoring over 50 peer-reviewed articles in Western medical journals and several patents. Yet, as discussed above, several of his political opponents or associates within Yugoslav émigré communities accused him of fraudulently posing as a doctor. Such claims, however, should be read with great caution and in the context of Cold War exile politics, where personal attacks and accusations of fraud were common weapons in ideological and personal rivalries. These accusations did not provide any proof and were often based on hearsay.

The historical context of his youth is also important. During World War II, medical students were frequently drafted into military service before completing their studies and served in roles equivalent to doctors, with practical experience sometimes counting in lieu of formal qualifications. Emergency graduations or field promotions were normal. In the postwar era, operating outside strict credentialing norms was not unusual, especially in underregulated regions or in wartime and refugee contexts such as the postcolonial Middle East and even parts of postwar Europe, where war and displacement had disrupted formal education systems. Within émigré communities, especially those that saw themselves as governments-in-exile, there was also a tendency to recognize credentials of individuals with partial, interrupted or poorly documented educations, both for practical and symbolic reasons. Newly independent states like Egypt and Iraq faced critical shortages of health professionals, and informal or performance-based credentialing, particularly for those with experience in military medical units, was often tolerated and even highly valued. This pattern reflects a broader, historically documented trend in which war-related disruption and urgent need led many countries to adopt flexible medical credentialing practices, particularly in conflict-affected or underregulated regions.

Assumptions based on the absence of modern documentation can reflect a form of source skepticism rooted in presentist thinking, where the past is judged by contemporary standards of verification. Such approaches risk misrepresenting historical realities, particularly in contexts like the 1940s and 1950s, when war, displacement, and underdeveloped record-keeping often disrupted formal credentialing systems.

== Political and theological writings ==
He wrote extensively on Croatian diaspora and Yugoslav politics, world affairs, the Middle East conflict and Islamic theology, often under various pseudonyms, including Firuz (or Firus, Firoz) the Younger (Firuz mlađi), a pen name said to be inspired by his father's, who allegedly had published works on Arabic religious debates under the name "Firuz." (Note: He was speculated to have called himself Firuz Muftić as well.) Muftić’s political thought fused pan-Islamist ambitions, radical Croatian nationalism, and militant anti-communism.

His contributions to Islamic theology are cited in the Encyclopaedia of the Qurʾān, a six-volume academic reference work edited by Islamic scholar Jane Dammen McAuliffe and originally published 2001–2006, which discusses his argument that the Luqmān of the Qurʾān can be identified with the Greek physician and philosopher Alcmaeon, noting striking similarities between their teachings. According to Muftić, the ethical principles in sūra 31 constitute a physicians’ oath superior to the Hippocratic tradition.

== Death and legacy ==
According to Ivo Mišur, Mahmut Muftić was seriously wounded in an attack carried out by the Yugoslav Directorate for State Security (UDBA) in 1963 but survived thanks to the intervention of his wife. The attack is mentioned in letters by Luburić. Around this time, Muftić became involved in an affair with the wife of an UDBA associate, whom he presented as his secretary. In July 1964, after Said Ramadan learned of the affair, Muftić fell out of favor with the Muslim Brotherhood, which contributed to the weakening of relations between the Brotherhood and the Croatian National Resistance (HNO). The Empire Never Ended podcast episode "Mustasha Brotherhood – The Mahmut Muftić Story" described this as a honey trap.

In a letter dated December 1969, Muftić's associate John Williamson, the self-described founder-president of the Society of Metaphysicians in the United Kingdom, responded to inquiries about Muftić's aura research, stating that Muftić was suffering from radioactive illness and requested that he not be contacted directly, except through the Society. The letter was published in the 1970 thesis The Human Aura. Another letter from Williamson said that riot mobs had broken into Muftić's laboratory in Cairo and murdered his colleague, that he fled to Germany and that "during his researches into pathological effects of radioactivity he sustained radioactive poisoning and was and still is unwell." This story was also recounted by Malcolm Hulke in The Encyclopedia of Alternative Medicine and Self-Help (1978), which claimed that Muftić went to East Germany after being warned by the pharmaceutical company he worked for (Schering) to abandon his esoteric studies. These accounts should be treated with caution. They may reflect misunderstandings, at least in part, and it is possible Muftić crafted narratives that did not accurately reflect the cause of his alleged illness or his whereabouts for his esoteric associates, perhaps to shield his parallel activities as a covert operative entangled in Cold War intelligence games, to maintain separation between the different spheres he moved in, and to protect both his own security and that of others. It is unlikely that Muftić, a long-time militant anti-communist, would go to East Germany; his publications continued to list a P.O. box in Geneva as his address until at least 1970, and his trail ends in Dublin. Fatal radiation accidents are rare outside major mishandling or direct exposure, but radiation poisoning was a known Cold War assassination method, and in some cases, it could be difficult to distinguish from natural causes. UDBA actively targeted Croatian nationalists during the 1960s, including several of Muftić's associates. Egypt's security services also targeted the Muslim Brotherhood, sending assassins who attempted to kill his long-time confidant Said Ramadan in Geneva. Other sources have suggested Muftić was poisoned in a hotel in London, allegedly because his killers suspected him of being a Mossad agent, a rumor that may have stemmed from Muslim rivals accusing him of arms dealing with Israel or the more generalized suspicions about ties to a variety of Western intelligence services that included both the CIA and British intelligence. By the mid-1960s, Muftić had fallen out with the Croatian National Resistance as well, with Luburić denouncing him as a "spy". Muftić’s unique brand of Cold War politics had alienated him from all factions he was entangled with, leaving him potentially in the crosshairs of multiple intelligence agencies, Muslim political factions, and terrorist groups. Historian Jere Jareb highlighted in Branimir Jelić's memoirs how Muftić died suddenly. According to an obituary by William Joseph Bryan, Muftić died in September 1971.

Muftić embodied the fluid, ambiguous identities that defined many Cold War operatives, exiles, and revolutionaries. His scientific work aligned with the mid-20th century’s turn toward biochemical research, while his ventures into hypnosis and metaphysical topics mirrored contemporary interest in psychological manipulation and intelligence gathering. The Empire Never Ended podcast episode "Mustasha Brotherhood – The Mahmut Muftić Story" described him as "the enigmatic Ustasha who forged an unlikely alliance between the Muslim Brotherhood and Croatian National Resistance." Muftić’s life crossed between science, revolutionary politics, and metaphysical exploration, as he tried to connect worlds that few others ever combined. In the end, he remained isolated, alienated, and caught between them, a restless exile shaped by the shadow conflicts of the Cold War. Muftić's life was explored in three episodes of the podcast series The Empire Never Ended.

== Bibliography ==
=== Articles ===
- Muftic, MK (1951). "L'isolation de microbes cérolytiques". Experientia. 7 (6): 219–220. doi:10.1007/BF02139000. PMID 14840449.
- Muftic, MK (1951). "[Radical tonsillectomy with diathermocoagulation of the tonsillar arteries]". Les Annales d'Oto-laryngologie. 68 (8–9): 716–721. PMID 12986469.
- Muftic, MK (1955). "Demonstration of fat peroxides in Mycobacteria tuberculosis treated by cerase". Enzymologia. 17 (4): 222–224. PMID 13317856.
- Muftic, MK; Loutfi, SD (1955). "A Case of Large Diverticulum of the Eustachian Tube". British Medical Journal. 1 (4920): 1010. doi:10.1136/bmj.1.4920.1010. PMC 2061701. PMID 14363776.
- Muftic, MK (1956). "Cerase: A wax-decomposing enzyme in experimental tuberculosis". British Journal of Tuberculosis and Diseases of the Chest. 50 (4): 356–358. doi:10.1016/S0366-0869(56)80010-5. PMID 13364254.
- Muftic, MK (1957). "Acetazolamide in Ménière's Disease". JAMA Otolaryngology–Head & Neck Surgery. 65 (6): 575–579. doi:10.1001/archotol.1957.03830240031007.
- Atia, IM; Muftic, MK (1957). "Hypnosis in the psychosomatic investigation of female homosexuality". British Journal of Medical Hypnotism: 41–46.
- Muftic, MK (1957). "Mutation of mycobacteria to proactinomyces by radioactive cobalt". Mycopathologia et Mycologia Applicata. 8 (2): 121–126. doi:10.1007/BF02130067. PMID 13464807.
- Muftic, MK (1957). "Isolation properties of the cerase". Enzymologia. 18 (1): 9–13. PMID 13414710.
- Muftic, MK (1957). "Relation between iron content and peroxidase activity of cerase". Enzymologia. 18 (1): 18–21. PMID 13414712.
- Muftic, MK (1957). "Mechanism of cerase action". Enzymologia. 18 (1): 14–17. PMID 13414711.
- Muftic, MK (1958). "A psychokinetic theory of hypnotism". British Journal of Medical Hypnotism. 10: 11–23.
- Muftic, MK (1958). "Mycostatin in Treatment of Otomycoses". Mycoses. 1 (5): 156–161. doi:10.1111/j.1439-0507.1958.tb04015.x.
- Muftic, MK (1958). "Prevention of Hemorrhages in E.N.T. Surgery by Interstitial Application of Thromboplastin". AMA Arch Otolaryngol. 67 (5): 542–545. doi:10.1001/archotol.1958.00730010556007. PMID 13520024.
- Muftic, MK (1958). "Eustachian tube biopsy cannula". The Laryngoscope. 68 (2): 131–132. doi:10.1288/00005537-195802000-00004. PMID 13515347.
- Muftic, MK (1958). "Advances in the pharmacological study of cerase—A new anti-tuberculous agent". British Journal of Tuberculosis and Diseases of the Chest. 52 (4): 308–312. doi:10.1016/S0366-0869(58)80007-6. PMID 13584757.
- Muftic, MK (1959). "Investigation of resistance of mycobacteria to decolorization". Tubercle. 40 (1): 50–53. doi:10.1016/S0041-3879(59)80020-9. PMID 13647657.
- Muftic, MK (1959). "Advances in Pathogenesis and Treatment of Otosclerosis". Acta Oto-Laryngologica. 50 (1): 3–12. doi:10.3109/00016485909129148. PMID 13626563.
- Muftic, MK (1959). "A contribution to the psychokinetic theory of hypnotism". British Journal of Medical Hypnotism. 10: 24.
- Muftic, MK (1960). "Genus Blastomycoides As A Mykological Entity". Mycoses. 3 (1): 16–25. doi:10.1111/j.1439-0507.1960.tb03261.x.
- Muftic, MK (1960). "The genus Blastomycoides as a mycological entity". Mycopathologia et Mycologia Applicata. 12 (4): 265–277. doi:10.1007/BF02051400.
- Muftic, MK (1960). "Treatment of Chronic Otitis Media By Chloromycetin and Streptomycin". The Journal of Laryngology & Otology. 74 (2): 100–105. doi:10.1017/s0022215100056292. PMID 14425014.
- Muftic, MK (1960). "Hypnosis inducing cannabinole analogs". Journal of the American Society of Psychosomatic Dentistry & Medicine. 7 (4): 106–115.
- Muftic, MK (1961). "Studies on cell-wall chemistry of Mycobacteria". Japanese Journal of Tuberculosis. 9: 11–17. PMID 14476988.
- Muftic, MK (1961). "The chemistry of hypnosis". Journal of the American Institute of Hypnosis. 2 (2): 6–16.
- Muftic, MK (1962). "Isolation and purification of the penicillinase from mycobacteria". Experientia. 18 (1): 17–18. doi:10.1007/BF02136632. PMID 14476986.
- Muftic, MK (1962). "Middlebrook-Dubos neutral red test in Mycobacterium tuberculosis treated by cerase". Indian Journal of Medical Sciences. 16: 230–236. PMID 14476987.
- Muftic, MK (1963). "Polypeptidyl Tuberculins". Pathologia et Microbiologia. 26 (4): 494–503. doi:10.1159/000161403. PMID 14046894.
- Muftic, MK (1963). "The mechanism of mycobacterial pathogenicity". British Journal of Diseases of the Chest. 57 (1): 22–29. doi:10.1016/S0007-0971(63)80004-2.
- Muftic, MK (1963). "Die Klassifizierung der verschiedenen Arten der Gattung Candida mit der "Amid-Reihe" nach Bönicke". Hefepilze Als Krankheitserreger bei Mensch und Tier: 9–11. doi:10.1007/978-3-642-86989-1_4.
- Muftic, MK (1963). "Study of Amide Metabolism in Candida". Pathologia et Microbiologia. 26 (2): 250–253. doi:10.1159/000161371.
- Muftic, M (1963). "Dr. Carlo Marchesi on the occasion of his Jubilee celebrating 30 years of pioneering work in Hypnosis". British Journal of Medical Hypnotism. 15 (3): 26–29.
- Muftic, MK (1964). "A New Phenol–Hypochlorite Reaction for Ammonia". Nature. 201 (4919): 622–623. Bibcode:1964Natur.201..622M. doi:10.1038/201622a0. PMID 14160659.
- Muftic, MK (1964). "N-acetyl-naphthylamine esterase activity as a virulence test in Mycobacteria". Zbl. Bakt. 192: 353–357. PMID 14190319.
- Muftic, MK; Roch-Ramel, F (1964). "Pharmacological study of a peptide obtained during a tuberculin skin reaction". Arzneimittelforschung. 14: 1012–1014. PMID 14347303.
- Muftic, MK; Tuncman, SZ (1964). "Quantitative analysis of neutral red test in mycobacteria". British Journal of Diseases of the Chest. 58 (2): 85–89. doi:10.1016/S0007-0971(64)80037-1. PMID 14152221.
- Muftic, M (1964). "Dr Karlo Marchesi: trideset-godišnji jubilej znanstvenog rada". Hrvatska revija. 14: 51–53.
- Muftic, M (1966). "[Quantitative catalase determination in mycobacteria]". Beiträge zur Klinik und Erforschung der Tuberkulose und der Lungenkrankheiten. 134 (2): 103–109. doi:10.1007/BF02091709. PMID 5961425.
- Muftic, M (1966). "Eine vereinfachte Methode zum Nachweis mykostatischer Wirkung". Mycoses. 10 (1): 27–30. doi:10.1111/j.1439-0507.1966.tb02787.x.
- Muftic, M; Schröder, E (1966). "Peptidasegram in the Differentiation of Bacilli Species". Pathologia et Microbiologia. 29 (2): 252–256. doi:10.1159/000161907. PMID 5326905.
- Muftic, M (1966). "Naphthylamidasen in Mycobakterien". Zeitschrift für Medizinische Mikrobiologie und Immunologie. 152 (3): 173–175. doi:10.1007/BF02216000.
- Muftic, M (1966). "Die quantitative Katalase-Bestimmung bei Mycobakterien". Beiträge zur Klinik und Erforschung der Tuberkulose und der Lungenkrankheiten. 134 (2): 103–109. doi:10.1007/BF02091709.
- Muftic, M (1967). "Akute BCG-Infektion". Beiträge zur Klinik und Erforschung der Tuberkulose und der Lungenkrankheiten. 135 (5): 370–376. doi:10.1007/BF02091967. PMID 4876570.
- Muftic, M; Redmann, U (1967). "Isolierte Agarbestandteile, die wachstumshemmend auf Mycobacterium tuberculosis wirken". Zeitschrift für Medizinische Mikrobiologie und Immunologie. 153 (3): 228–232. doi:10.1007/BF02150014.
- Muftic, M (1967). "Application of chromogenic substrates to the determination of peptidases in mycobacteria". Folia Microbiologica. 12 (6): 500–507. doi:10.1007/BF02875711. PMID 4865924.
- Albertz, H; Muftic, M (1968). "Automatische Natrium-Fluxometrie". Biophysik. 4 (3): 214–223. Bibcode:1968Biopk...4..214A. doi:10.1007/BF01191597. PMID 5704332.
- Muftic, M (1968). "Solubilisation von Polyenen Durch Wasserlösliche Steroide". Quarterly Journal of Crude Drug Research. 8 (3): 1274–1280. doi:10.3109/13880206809108858.
- Muftic, M; Redmann, U (1968). "Aus Eidotter isolierter Wachstumsfaktor für M. tuberculosis". ZBL. Bakt. (I., Orig.). 204: 242–247.
- Muftic, M (1968). "Solubilisation von Polyenen Durch Wasserlösliche Steroide". Quarterly Journal of Crude Drug Research. 8 (4): 1274–1288. doi:10.3109/13880206809083354.
- Muftic, M; Redmann, U (1968). "Neues Medium und neue Methoden zur Resistenzbestimmung von Mycobacterium tuberculosis". Beiträge zur Klinik und Erforschung der Tuberkulose und der Lungenkrankheiten. 137 (3): 209–215. doi:10.1007/BF02097998.
- Muftic, M (1968). "Forechungt: Pyrrolidin-N-carbonsäure-3-methyl-5-isopropylphenylester, ein neues spezifisches Antidermatophyten-Mittel". Mycoses. 11 (5): 369–376. doi:10.1111/j.1439-0507.1968.tb03340.x.
- Muftic, MK (1969). "Characteristic changes in mycobacterium tuberculosis induced by some tensides (surface-active agents)". Tubercle. 50 (3): 305–312. doi:10.1016/0041-3879(69)90056-7. PMID 4981500.
- Muftic, MK; Atia, IM (1969). "A new induction method: electrohypnosis". Journal of the American Society of Psychosomatic Dentistry & Medicine. 16 (2): 40–46. PMID 5265052.
- Muftic, M (1969). "Neue Substanzen Mit Komplementbindungshemmender Wirkung in Vitro". Quarterly Journal of Crude Drug Research. 9 (3): 1422–1425. doi:10.3109/13880206909066285.
- Muftic, M (1969). "Antimicrobial Properties of 2-(5-Nitrofurfuryliden)-Indanones". Quarterly Journal of Crude Drug Research. 9 (1): 1336–1345. doi:10.3109/13880206909066275.
- Muftic, M (1969). "Metamorphosis of Miracidia into Cercariae of Schistosoma mansoni in vitro". Parasitology. 59 (2): 365–371. doi:10.1017/S0031182000082330. PMID 5770074.
- Muftic, M (1970). "New Antibilharzia Drugs and Test Methods". Quarterly Journal of Crude Drug Research. 10 (4): 1639–1643. doi:10.3109/13880207009066235.
- Muftic, M (1970). "Essay on Antibiotic Properties of Abietyl Compounds". Quarterly Journal of Crude Drug Research. 10 (3): 1601–1607. doi:10.3109/13880207009066229.
- Muftic, M (1971). "A peptidase from Mycobacterium phlei. I. Extraction and purification". ZBL. Bakt. (Zweite naturwissenschaftliche Abt.: Allgemeine, landwirtschaftliche und technische Mikrobiologie). 126 (5): 456–460.
- Muftic, MK (1971). "Are the catecholamines precursors of the catatonine?". Journal of the American Institute of Hypnosis. 12 (1): 29–32.
- Muftic, MK (1971). "Psychological crusades of the modern time". Nigerian Journal of Islam. 1 (2): 23–28.
- Muftic, MK (1971). "Influence of subcutaneous application of trans-3-methyl-2-hexanoic acid on induction of hypnosis". Journal of the American Institute of Hypnosis. 12 (3): 118–119, 140.
- Muftic, M (1974). "Modern evolutionary theories of the origin of life and of man and the Holy Quran". Journal of the American Institute of Hypnosis. 15 (6): 259–264. Originally published in The Islamic Review & Arab Affairs, 1969.
- Muftic, M (1975). "The Qur'an on the cause of the fall of man". Journal of the American Institute of Hypnosis. 16 (1): 8–15. Originally published in The Islamic Review & Arab Affairs, 1969.

=== Patents ===
- Muftic MK, Priewe H, Ulbrich H (1965). Process for the preparation of substituted hydrazones. German Patent DE1620445A1.
- Kutzsche A, Muftic MK, Peissker H (1969). 3-methyl-5-isopropylphenyl esters of n-pyrrolidino and n-morpholino carboxylic acids. US Patent US 3457262 A.
- Gutsche K, Muftic MK (1972). Pyrimidine derivatives. US Patent US 3632584 A
- Albrecht R, Muftic MK, Schröder E (1973). 5-nitro-furfurylidene antimicrobic agents. US Patent US 3716531 A.

=== Books ===
- Mahmoud K. Muftic: Researches on the Aura Phenomena, Borderline Science Series, No. 6, Metaphysical Research Group, 1960. Second part: Researches on the Aura Phenomena, Part 2, Borderline Science Series, No. 8, Metaphysical Research Group, 1961. Second ed. (both parts), 1970, Hastings, Society of Metaphysicians, ISBN 0-900684-14-3 (iv, 44 p.). Republished, Society of Metaphysicians, 1998, ISBN 978-0-900684-14-2. While relatively rare, Muftić’s book is preserved in library collections such as the British Library and Trinity College Dublin Library.
