= HNO =

HNO may refer to:

- Croatian National Committee (Hrvatski narodni odbor), an organization founded by the Ustaša Branimir Jelić
- Croatian National Resistance (Hrvatski narodni otpor), an organization founded by the Ustaša Maks Luburić
- Hockey Northwestern Ontario
- Nitroxyl
- Northern Hindko language (ISO 639-3 code), in Pakistan
