= Ramesh Raina =

Indian-American plant molecular biologist

- Known for: Plant disease resistance Plant pathology
- Awards: AAAS Fellow
- Scientific career
- Workplaces: Syracuse University
- Thesis: Molecular Genetics of Nitrogen Fixation in Azotobacter vinelandii (1991)
- Website: rainalab.syr.edu

Ramesh Raina (born 1961) is a professor of biotechnology at Syracuse University. Raina's research focuses on plant microbiology, specifically plant pathology and plant disease resistance.

== Background ==
Raina attended the Banaras Hindu University, graduating in 1982 with an B.S. and a M.S. degree in 1985. He earned a Ph.D. in molecular biology, from Jawaharlal Nehru University in 1991 for his work titled "Molecular Genetics of Nitrogen Fixation in Azotobacter vinelandi". He completed post-doctoral research with Nina Fedoroff at Carnegie Institution of Washington.

Raina joined the Penn State University as an assistant professor of biology. He was recruited to Syracuse in 2003. At Syracuse, Raina chairs the biology department and manages the biotechnology program. He also served as the interim vice-president of research from 2019 to 2022.

== Awards ==
- 2007 Fellows of the American Association for the Advancement of Science

== Personal life ==
Raina is married to Surabhi Raina, who is also a biology professor at Syracuse. They met in college and married in India in 1989.
