= Daryl Copeland =

Canadian analyst, author, speaker and educator

Daryl Copeland is a Canadian analyst, author, speaker and educator specializing in diplomacy, international policy, public management and global issues. Copeland's institutional affiliations include the University of Toronto's Munk Centre for International Studies as a senior fellow, and the USC Center on Public Diplomacy as a research fellow.

== Career ==
Copeland grew up in downtown Toronto, and received his formal education at the University of Western Ontario (gold medal, political science; chancellor's prize, social sciences) and the Norman Paterson School of International Affairs (Canada Council Special MA Scholarship).

From 1981 to 2009, Copeland served as a Canadian diplomat with postings in Thailand, Ethiopia, New Zealand and Malaysia. During the 1980s and 1990s, he was elected a record five times to the executive committee of the Professional Association of Foreign Service Officers. From 1996 to 1999 he was national program director of the Canadian Institute of International Affairs in Toronto and editor of Behind the Headlines, Canada's international affairs magazine. In 2000, he received the Canadian Foreign Service Officer Award.

While working for the Department of Foreign Affairs and International Trade (DFAIT) in Ottawa, Copeland served as deputy director for international communications; director for Southeast Asia; senior advisor, public diplomacy; director of strategic communications services; and senior advisor, strategic policy and planning.

Copeland serves as a peer reviewer for Canadian Foreign Policy, the International Journal, and The Hague Journal of Diplomacy, and is a member of the editorial board of the journal Place Branding and Public Diplomacy. He is also a senior research fellow at the Canadian Defence and Foreign Affairs Institute.

== Published works ==
Copeland is the author of Guerrilla Diplomacy: Rethinking International Relations, released in July 2009. Copeland is the author of an article for the journal Science & Diplomacy, entitled "Bridging the Chasm: Why Science and Technology Must Become Priorities for Diplomacy and International Policy", published in July 2015.

== Bibliography ==
- Copeland, Daryl (2009). Guerrilla Diplomacy: Rethinking International Relations, Lynne Rienner Publishers. ISBN 978-1-58826-655-2

== See also ==
- Guerrilla Diplomacy
