= Blastomyces cerolytica =

Scientific classification
- Kingdom: Fungi
- Division: Ascomycota
- Class: Eurotiomycetes
- Order: Onygenales
- Family: Ajellomycetaceae
- Genus: Blastomyces
- Species: B. cerolytica

Binomial name
- Blastomyces cerolytica Muftic (1957)

Species of fungus

Blastomyces cerolytica is a species of yeast-like fungus. It was discovered and named by Mahmoud K.S. Muftić, and published in 1957.
