= Sydney James Van Pelt =

Australian medical practitioner

Sydney James Van Pelt (born 1 February 1908 in Melbourne; † 7 January 1976) was an Australian medical practitioner and a pioneer of modern medical hypnosis and hypnotherapy.

== Family ==
The son and only child of John Thomas Van Pelt (1878-1932), and Bertha Florence Van Pelt, née Reid, he was born in Windsor, Victoria on 1 February 1908.

== Medicine ==
Graduating M.B.B.S. from the University of Melbourne in December 1933, he was appointed to the staff of The Alfred Hospital, Melbourne at the end of 1933. He served for a time in the Royal Navy, as a Surgeon Lieutenant-Commander. After the war, he had a practice in Harley Street.

== Hypnotism ==
Having first encountered hypnotism in Melbourne, in 1932, he was the founding editor of the British Journal of Medical Hypnotism, President of the British Society of Medical Hypnotists, and a member of the (U.S.) Society for Clinical and Experimental Hypnosis.

In 1952 he was commissioned by the British Minister of Health, the Home Office and the National Association of Mental Health to assist in the adoption of the U.K. Hypnotism Act 1952.

== Publications ==
- How to conquer nerves. London, Skeffington / Roy Publishers, 1954. OCLC 14674627
- Waking hypnosis. Hove : Courtenay Press, 1954.
- Hypnotic suggestion: its role in psychoneurotic and psychosomatic disorders: A thesis. New York: Philosophical Library, 1956. OCLC 1630501
- Modern hypnotism: key to the mind. Westport, Conn., : Associated Booksellers, 1956.
- Secrets of hypnotism. Wilshire Book Co., 1958. OCLC 8654285
- Hypnotism and the power within. New York: Wehman Bros., 1958. OCLC 9550663
- Hypnotism. London: W. & G. Foyle, 1960. OCLC 8654279
- With Gordon Ambrose and George Newbold: Medical Hypnosis: New Hope For Mankind. London: Gollancz, 1953. OCLC 14666843

New edition: Medical hypnosis handbook. Wilshire Book Co., 1965. OCLC 2951464
