= Science & Diplomacy =

- Frequency: Quarterly
- Format: Magazine
- Publisher: American Association for the Advancement of Science
- First issue: March 2012
- Country: United States
- Language: English
- Website: www.sciencediplomacy.org
- ISSN: 2167-8618
- OCLC: 793916922

Science & Diplomacy is a quarterly magazine published by the Center for Science Diplomacy of the American Association for the Advancement of Science (AAAS). The publication includes articles, short comments (perspectives), and letters on issues in the field of science diplomacy, diplomacy about scientific issues.

The magazine is published in print and online; the online edition is open access and available without charge on the internet. The articles are reviewed by the magazine's editorial staff and external reviewers, but not formally peer-reviewed.

The magazine's articles have been mentioned and cited in Scientific American, CNN, Pakistan Defence, the American Security Project blog, SciDevNet, and Al-Monitor. The Embassy of France, Washington, D.C., the Chinese Ministry of Science, The Austrian Embassy in Washington, DC, and the American Physical Society have also posted information about the journal.

== Leadership ==
The chair of the magazine's advisory board is Norman P. Neureiter; he discussed the magazine on the Kojo Nnamdi Show on June 25, 2012. Vaughan Turekian, who has written about the subject in Foreign Policy and Science, served as the editor-in-chief from the journal's launch in 2012 to 2015. In an editorial in the September 2015 issue, Turekian noted that William Colglazier would succeed him.

Other advisory board members include:

- Peter Agre, M.D., Professor, Johns Hopkins Bloomberg School of Public Health
- David Clary, F.R.S., Professor of Physical and Theoretical Chemistry and President of Magdalen College, Oxford
- Steven Clemons, Editor at Large, The Atlantic and National Journal
- Paula Dobriansky, Ph.D., Senior Fellow, Harvard Kennedy School of Government
- Esther Dyson, chairman, EdVenture
- Sumaya bint El Hassan, President, Jordan's Royal Scientific Society; chairman, Princess Sumaya University for Technology
- Richard N. Foster, Ph.D., Senior Faculty Fellow, Yale School of Management
- David A. Hamburg, M.D., Visiting Scholar, AAAS
- Mohamed H.A. Hassan, Co-chair, InterAcademy Panel (IAP)
- Kenneth H. Keller, Ph.D., Professor and Director, Johns Hopkins School of Advanced International Studies, Bologna, Italy

== History ==
The first issue was published in March 2012 to "promote interaction between the communities of scientific research and foreign policy."

== Notable authors ==
- Russ Carnahan, former U.S. congressman
- Alice Gast, Lehigh University president
- Robert Hormats, U.S. Under Secretary of State
- Dick Lugar, former U.S. senator
- Naledi Pandor, former South African Minister of Science and Technology
- Harold E. Varmus, Nobel Prize-winning scientist, Director of the National Cancer Institute
- David Evans Shaw, treasurer of the American Association for the Advancement of Science
- Rush D. Holt, Jr., chief executive officer of the American Association for the Advancement of Science and executive publisher of the Science family of journals
