= Hani Ramadan =

Swiss Imam originally from Egypt

Hani Ramadan is a Swiss Imam originally from Egypt. He is a grandson of Muslim Brotherhood founder Hassan al-Banna, a son of Said Ramadan and the brother of scholar Tariq Ramadan.

== Life and career ==
Ramadan is married and fathers three children. He is the director of the Islamic Center of Geneva and the author of several books and newspaper articles on Islam and its doctrine. In 1983 he obtained Swiss citizenship by naturalization and earned a doctorate in Philosophy from the University of Geneva.

He taught French in high school until he was fired in 2002 by the Swiss government for "anti-democratic" statements he made in French newspaper Le Monde. He defended stoning for adultery and believes AIDS is a "divine curse". He went to court and won his case in 2002 but the Swiss government refused to reinstate him.

He again attracted the attention of the press and Swiss authorities by virtue of his radical statements. At the 2014 meeting of the Union of Islamic Organizations in France, he stated: "All the evil in the world originates from the Jews and the Zionist barbarism". In June 2016 he was invited to speak about Islamophobia at a Swiss high school. He stated that a woman "is like a pearl in a shell. If it is shown it fosters jealousy. Here a woman without a veil is like a two euro coin. Visible to all she goes from hand to hand".

He was expelled from France on April 8, 2017, for his past remarks and behaviour that posed a serious threat to public order, as per the statement issued by the French Interior Ministry.
