= Guerrilla diplomacy =

Guerrilla diplomacy is a method of diplomacy that is identified as an alternative approach to the established common frameworks of international relations, being primarily articulated by Daryl Copeland in response to the foreign policy outcomes of the war on terror. In a sense, the responses to the major events of the late 20th century and the early 21st century which has brought major changes to the International Order is identified as in need of a new paradigm of diplomatic thinking in order to adapt to the needs of modern diplomacy.

Examples cited of what may be identified as guerrilla diplomacy include: various activities undertaken by Sergio Vieira de Mello on behalf of the United Nations in Cambodia, former Yugoslavia and East Timor, 1991–2002; Ambassador Ken Taylor's actions during the Iran hostage crisis of 1979; Swedish Diplomat Raoul Wallenberg's efforts to save lives during World War II, and Canadian Fisheries Minister Brian Tobin's public display, from a barge in the East River opposite UN headquarters, of undersized fishing nets seized from a Spanish trawler during the "cod war" between the United Kingdom and Iceland, in 1994. In 2018, it was effectively applied in the United Kingdom in the Windrush scandal to guide the strategy employed by Guy Hewitt and fellow Caribbean Community high commissioners in London to transform the Windrush issue into a national concern in Britain and bring about a major policy u-turn.

== Background ==
Within the book Guerrilla Diplomacy: Rethinking International Relations, a comparison to the principles that underlies Guerrilla Warfare was used, identifying some of the traits that Copeland listed as being also of utility within the context of international relations and cross-cultural diplomatic outreach, namely that of 'agility, adaptability, improvisation, self-sufficiency, and popular support’.

The book have been favourably reviewed by Professor Nicholas Cull as "essential to navigating the diplomatic rapids of the twenty-first century", and its analysis as a "milestone" in "diplomacy's current revolution" by Simon Anholt, among other notable figures offering praise for the framework proposed in this context.

GD responded to the marginalisation of dialogue, negotiation, and collaboration as tools of international relations and arises due to a belief that more resolute diplomatic approaches have been sidelined as a result of the militarisation of international policy which has been carried forward from the Cold War to the global war on terror. It was designed in response to the challenges of globalisation, and is at home in that transformed operating environment. The principle of creating and sustaining an atmosphere of confidence, trust and respect has been identified as a necessity in order to address those perceived flaws of the current policy approaches in particular.

== Discussion ==
Guerrilla diplomacy operates using methods distinct from those employed in traditional diplomacy and moves contemporary thinking on public diplomacy and soft power towards new frontiers. GD takes full account of the challenges to development and security that are embedded in globalisation, and is designed to address the range of global issues, ranging from pandemic disease to climate change to resource scarcity, which are rooted in science and driven by technology. Copeland discusses the importance of this connection between science and diplomacy in his article for the journal Science & Diplomacy, entitled “Bridging the Chasm: Why Science and Technology Must Become Priorities for Diplomacy and International Policy.” It is based on meaningful exchange in two directions, in that messages are transmitted outwards, to interlocutors in the field, and are also fed back into the policy development process. At its best, therefore, GD results in altered behaviour and outcomes in both receiving and sending states.

Guerrilla diplomacy highlights the importance of abstract thinking, advanced problem-solving skills and rapid-adaptive cognition. It pushes diplomatic practice into more distant, less state-centric places, from shanty towns to conflict zones. The effectiveness of GD turns on the collection of tactical and strategic intelligence, on the development of alternative networks, and on the production of demonstrable results by boring deep into the interstices of power and navigating pathways inaccessible to others. Success at these endeavors may involve relying on technology, and especially the new media as a force multiplier, on taking a less formal approach to representation, and, perhaps most importantly, on thinking creatively, listening carefully and analysing rigorously.

The guerrilla diplomat is a cross-culturally literate and capable person who masters culture of nation A and B and use soft power. and is a practitioner of guerrilla diplomacy. guerrilla diplomat’s mainly works out of traditional diplomacy for example talking to local population directly, or to the other side directly without traditional diplomatic protocol. the most promonent example are Sérgio Vieira de Mello, Raoul Wallenberg, Kenneth D. Taylor and lastly Guy Hewitt

In political communications generally, and for guerrilla diplomacy in particular, the how is as important as the what. The guerrilla diplomat is resilient, maximizing self-reliance while minimising the need for the usual investment in plant, infrastructure, and logistical support. Guerrilla diplomats have the street smarts to avoid alienating either their hosts — or their home-government colleagues.

== Key Concepts ==
ACTE — a de-territorialized world order model designed to replace the Cold War-era. First, Second and Third World formulation by capturing the essential elements of the globalisation age. The new model may be applied to individuals, groups, neighbourhoods, cities, countries and/or regions. It consists of the:

A or advancing world, which controls the wealth and whose economic and political advantage is growing;

C or contingent world, whose prospects are uncertain and will be determined by future developments, which could tip in either direction;

T or tertiary world, characterized by endemic poverty and whose relative position is subservient or dependent;

E or excluded world, which is for the most part outside of globalization’s matrix.

Diplomatic ecosystem — an organic, multi-tiered, interdependent diplomatic whole consisting of the foreign ministry and foreign service; individual diplomats; departments and agencies of government with international policy responsibilities or content; and non-state actors.

Geodiplomatics — a systematic, non-violent and communications-based approach to the effective management of the world’s strategic nexuses.

Global political economy of knowledge — a collaborative, heuristic and virtual store of the world's information and expertise, accessible principally through the new media, which pervades, supports and reinforces critical productive, transnational and power relationships, including the digital divide, on the ground.

Guerrilla diplomacy — a cross-cultural, enabled, and grassroots approach to diplomatic practice characterized by autonomy, agility, adaptability and resilience; a premium on intelligence gathering and analysis; access to global political economy of knowledge; the ability to act with souplesse.

Heteropolarity - an emerging world system in which competing states or groups of states derive their relative power and influence from dissimilar sources - social, economic, political, military, cultural. The disparate vectors which empower these heterogeneous poles are difficult to compare or measure; stability in the age of globalization will therefore depend largely upon the diplomatic functions of knowledge-driven problem solving and complex balancing.

Representational footprint — the physical evidence, or lack thereof, of diplomatic presence and infrastructure.

Souplesse — the ability to connect with the global political economy of knowledge for the remedial application of scientific and technological capacity in order to engage specific threats and challenges, typically in support of security and development.
