= Said Ramadan =

Egyptian political activist (1926–1995)

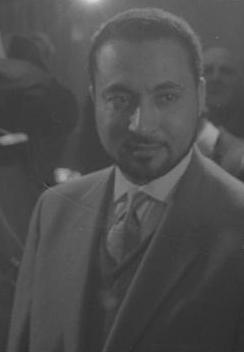
Said Ramadan in 1961

Said Ramadan (Arabic: سعيد رمضان; 12 April 1926 – 4 August 1995) was an Egyptian political activist, and one of the preeminent leaders of the Muslim Brotherhood.

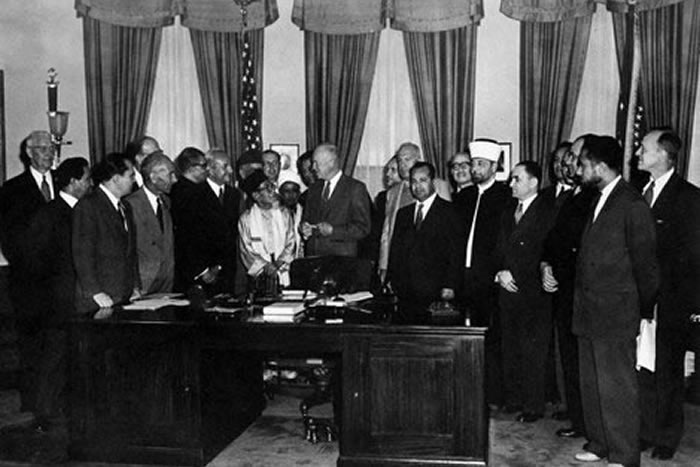
Said Ramadan (second from the right) in the Oval Office with US President Dwight D. Eisenhower and other Muslim leaders in 1953

He was the son-in-law of Hassan al-Banna, the Muslim Brotherhood's founder, and emerged as one of the brotherhood's main leaders in the 1950s. Ramadan was often accused by the Egyptian government of Gamal Abdul Nasser of being in the CIA's pay. After being expelled from Egypt for his activities, Ramadan moved to Saudi Arabia where he was one of the original members of the constituent council of the Muslim World League, a charity and missionary group funded by the Saudi government. From the 1950s, he was considered the Muslim Brotherhood's unofficial "foreign minister."

Ramadan also played a pivotal role in Pakistan, where he moved in 1948, after the creation of Israel, to attend the World Muslim Congress held in Karachi as the representative of the Muslim Brotherhood. However he was not chosen as its secretary-general because of his extremism. He was still able to influence young Pakistani intellectuals by hosting weekly radio programs and publishing booklets discussing Islamic affairs. Ramadan met Abul A'la Maududi and was endorsed by Prime Minister Liaquat Ali Khan, who prefaced one of his books. To better integrate in Pakistani society he wore a Jinnah cap, which "made people forget he was Egyptian". His work as an ideologue is said to have contributed in making Pakistan an Islamic Republic in 1956, as "he was omnipresent in the media - arguing, on every occasion, for legislation based on the sharia."

From the 1950s, Ramadan enjoyed extensive support from the CIA, which saw him as an ally in the battle against communism. By the end of the 1950s, "the CIA was overtly backing Ramadan. While it is overly simplistic to call him a US agent, in the 1950s and 1960s the United States supported him as he took over a mosque in Munich, kicking out local Muslims to build what would become one of the Brotherhood's most important centers, a refuge for the beleaguered group during its decades in the wilderness. One of his close confidants was Bosnian Muslim Mahmoud K. Muftić, who had married his cousin. In the end, the US did not gain much for its efforts, as Ramadan was more interested in spreading his Islamist agenda than fighting communism."

Said Ramadan was the father of Hani Ramadan and Tariq Ramadan. On 9 August 1995 Ramadan was interred next to his father-in-law Hassan al-Banna. The Said Ramadan Peace Prize is named in his honour.

== Books and booklets ==
- Islamic law; its scope and equity
- Islam and nationalism
- Three major problems confronting the world of Islam
- Islam, doctrine and way of life
- What we stand for
- What is an Islamic state?
