= British Society of Medical Hypnotists =

The British Society of Medical Hypnotists was an organization composed of professional hypnotherapists located in London.

The main objective the Society was to establish standards of practice regarding the use of hypnosis and hypnotherapy. The society was founded in 1948. Sydney van Pelt was the first and lifetime (until 1976) president of the Society. Its official organ was the British Journal of Medical Hypnotism.
