= Office of the Science and Technology Adviser to the Secretary of State =

Independent science and technology advisors to the US government

The Office of the Science and Technology Adviser to the Secretary of State (sometimes referred to as STAS) is the principal office within the United States Department of State for independent science and technology advising. STAS was created in 2000 by Secretary of State Madeleine Albright in response to a 1999 study by the National Academy of Sciences which called for the establishment of an independent science adviser. STAS focuses on anticipating the impact of emerging science, technology, and innovation issues on foreign policy, building the State Department's capacity to engage with emerging science, technology, and innovation issues, and engaging with the science, technology, and innovation community to achieve Department goals.

STAS is typically led by the Science and Technology Adviser to the Secretary. Following a recommendation in a 2015 study by the National Academy of Sciences, the Adviser position was given the rank of Assistant Secretary. To date there have been seven advisers: Norman P. Neureiter, George Atkinson, Nina Fedoroff, William Colglazier, Vaughan Turekian and Mung Chiang. Matt Chessen was the acting Adviser from 2018 to 2019 and again briefly from 2020 to 2021. In February 2021, Allison Schwier was appointed the acting Adviser. Dr. Patricia Gruber was the sitting Science and Technology Advisor, appointed September 2023; however, the position was vacated in January 2025 due to a change in administration.

STAS operates the State Department's science and technology fellowship programs, including the AAAS S&T Fellowships Program, the Jefferson Science Fellows Program, and professional science and engineering fellowships with the American Institute of Physics, Georgetown Center for Security and Emerging Technologies, and the Institute of Electrical and Electronics Engineers. Under Vaughan Turekian, STAS helped found the Foreign Ministers Science and Technology Advisers Network, an international network of S&T advisers to foreign ministers and heads of State.

| # | Science and Technology Adviser to the Secretary of State |
|---|---|
| 1 | Norman P. Neureiter |
| 2 | George Atkinson |
| 3 | Nina Fedoroff |
| 4 | William Colglazier |
| 5 | Vaughan Turekian |
| 6 | Mung Chiang |
| - | Matt Chessen (Acting) |
| - | Allison Schwier (Acting) |
| 7 | Patricia Gruber |
