= British Journal of Medical Hypnotism =

- Discipline: Hypnosis
- Language: English
- Edited by: Sydney James Van Pelt

Publication details
- History: 1949–1966
- Publisher: Hove (United Kingdom)
- Frequency: Quarterly

Standard abbreviations
- ISO 4: Br. J. Med. Hypn.

Indexing
- CODEN: BJMHAL
- ISSN: 0572-7065
- OCLC no.: 183400179

The British Journal of Medical Hypnotism was a peer-reviewed medical journal and an official journal of the British Society of Medical Hypnotists. It was established in 1949 and ceased publication in 1966. It was indexed in PubMed/MEDLINE.

== See also ==
- Hypnotherapy
