= American Institute of Hypnosis =

American scholarly organization

The American Institute of Hypnosis was a scholarly society devoted to the scientific study of hypnosis, founded on 4 May 1955 by the physician and pioneering hypnotist William Joseph Bryan. The society published an academic journal, the Journal of the American Institute of Hypnosis, edited by Bryan. Bryan's work notably found use in psychological warfare during the Cold War.
