= Norman P. Neureiter =

American scientist, technology adviser, and science diplomacy expert

1st Science and Technology Adviser to the Secretary of State
- Preceded by: Position established
- Succeeded by: George Atkinson

Personal details
- Born: January 24, 1932 (age 94) Macomb, Illinois
- Education: University of Rochester; Northwestern University (PhD)

Norman P. Neureiter (born January 24, 1932) is an American scientist, technology adviser, and expert on science diplomacy. A graduate of the University of Rochester and Northwestern University, Neureiter has worked as a research scientist, a science attaché, a business executive and a governmental advisor. He has been awarded multiple state decorations and has received notable awards from the American Chemical Society, the National Academy of Sciences and the American Association for the Advancement of Science.

== Biography ==
Neureiter was born in Macomb, Illinois, and grew up in New York. After earning an undergraduate degree at the University of Rochester and a Ph.D. in chemistry at Northwestern University, Neureiter became a research scientist at Humble Oil. He then worked abroad for several years, establishing research collaborations between the United States and foreign countries. He then served as a deputy science attaché and science attache representing the US in several European countries.

In the late 1960s and early 1970s, Neureiter was an adviser to the White House Office of Science and Technology. He then joined Texas Instruments, where he worked until the mid-1990s. After retiring from Texas Instruments, he was a science advisor to the United States Secretary of State and a Distinguished Presidential Fellow for International Affairs at the U.S. National Academy of Sciences. He was named the first director of the American Association for the Advancement of Science (AAAS) Center for Science, Technology and Security Policy (CSTSP).

He won the 2003 AAAS Philip Hauge Abelson Prize "for his substantial contributions in building more effective relationships between the diplomatic and the scientific communities and in increasing both communities’ awareness of the importance of science and its value in international statecraft." He also won the 2008 Public Welfare Medal, which the National Academy of Sciences refers to as its most prestigious award. In 2010, he was selected to receive the Order of the Rising Sun, Gold and Silver Star, by the Japanese government. He was one of two recipients of the 2011 Public Service Award from the American Chemical Society. The next year, he received the Austrian Cross of Honor for Science and Art. He was awarded an honorary Doctor of Science from the State University of New York at Geneseo in 2014.

Neureiter speaks several languages. Early in his career, he taught Russian and German at the University of Houston.
