= Nina Fedoroff =

American biologist

Nina V. Fedoroff
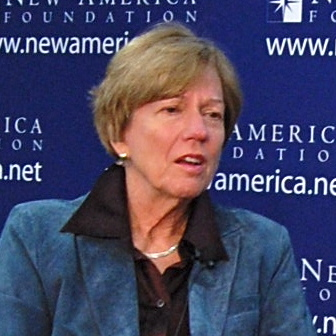
- Born: April 9, 1942 (age 84); Cleveland, Ohio
- Education: Syracuse University; The Rockefeller University
- Awards: National Medal of Science (2007)
- Scientific career
- Fields: Biology
- Thesis: Purification and Properties of Bacteriophage f2 Replicase (1972)
- Doctoral advisor: Norton Zinder

Nina Fedoroff

3rd Science and Technology Adviser to the Secretary of State
- Preceded by: George Atkinson
- Succeeded by: William Colglazier

Nina Vsevolod Fedoroff (born April 9, 1942) is an American molecular biologist known for her research in life sciences and biotechnology, especially transposable elements or jumping genes. and plant stress response. In 2007, President George W. Bush awarded her the National Medal of Science, she is also a member of the United States National Academy of Sciences, the American Academy of Arts and Sciences, the European Academy of Sciences, and the American Academy of Microbiology.

== Early life and education ==
Fedoroff, whose father was a Russian immigrant to the US and her mother a first generation immigrant, was born in Cleveland, Ohio. Her first language was Russian. When she was nine years old her family moved to Fayetteville, New York, a suburb of the city of Syracuse.

She then relocated to Philadelphia where she planned to study music but returned to study science at Syracuse University. She graduated summa cum laude in 1966 from Syracuse University with a dual major in biology and chemistry. She received her PhD in molecular biology 1972 from The Rockefeller University.

== Research career ==
Fedoroff talks about the importance and function of jumping genes.

After graduating from Rockefeller University in 1972 she joined the faculty of the University of California, Los Angeles, where she did research into nuclear RNA. She moved in 1978 to the Carnegie Institution for Science in Baltimore, Maryland, worked on developmental biology at the Department of Embryology, where she pioneered DNA sequencing and worked out the nucleotide sequence of the first complete gene. In 1978, she also joined the faculty of Johns Hopkins University Biology Department, where she worked on the molecular characterization of maize transposable elements or jumping genes, for which Barbara McClintock was awarded a Nobel Prize in 1983.

== Academic positions ==
In 1995, Fedoroff arrived at Pennsylvania State University as the Verne M. Willaman professor of Life Sciences and founded and directed the organization now known as the Huck Institutes of the Life Sciences. In 2002, she was appointed an Evan Pugh professor, the university's highest academic honor. In 2013 Federoff was a distinguished visiting professor at King Abdullah University of Science and Technology (KAUST), and a member of the external faculty of the Santa Fe Institute.

== Honors ==
In 1990, Fedoroff was honored with the Howard Taylor Ricketts Award from University of Chicago, and in 1992 she received the New York Academy of Sciences Outstanding Contemporary Women Scientist Award. In 1997, Fedoroff received the John P. McGovern Science and Society Medal from Sigma Xi. In 2003, she was awarded Syracuse University's George Arents Pioneer medal.

In 2001, President Bill Clinton appointed Fedoroff to the National Science Board, which oversees the National Science Foundation. which administers the science awards. Fedoroff was Science and Technology Adviser to U.S. Secretaries of State, Condoleezza Rice and Hillary Clinton and from 2007 to 2010 to the administrator Rajiv Shah for the United States Agency for International Development. In 2007, President George W. Bush awarded her the National Medal of Science in the field of Biological Sciences, the highest award for lifetime achievement in scientific research in the United States. Fedoroff was President of the American Association for the Advancement of Science (AAAS) from 2011 to 2012. She is a member of the United States National Academy of Sciences, the American Academy of Arts and Sciences, the European Academy of Sciences, and the American Academy of Microbiology.

== Personal life ==
Fedoroff has three children and seven grandchildren. She enjoys music, theatre and singing. Fedoroff was a single mother, and although she was studying and trying to make a living, she was able to raise two of her three children alone.

== Bibliography ==
=== Books ===
- Fedoroff, Nina (1992). The dynamic genome : Barbara McClintock's ideas in the Century of Genetics. Cold Spring Harbor Laboratory Press.
- Nina Fedoroff, Mendel in the Kitchen: A Scientist's View of Genetically Modified Foods, National Academy Press, 2004, ISBN 0-309-09205-1
- Nina Fedoroff, Plant Transposons and Genome Dynamics in Evolution, Barnes & Noble, Wiley, John & Sons, Incorporated, 2013, ISBN 9781118500101
- Tietjen, Jill S.; Busch-Vishniac, Ilene; Busch, Lauren (2026). "Chapter 36. Nina V. Fedoroff". Women Laureates 1970-2007: National Medal of Science and National Medal of Technology and Innovation Winners. Springer Nature. ISBN 978-3-032-23115-4.

=== Essays and reporting ===
- Fedoroff, Nina (February–March 2014). "Battle lines : will agriculture be a victim of its own success?". Special Feature. Food Wars. Cosmos. 55: 40–41.

== See also ==
- Barbara McClintock
