= William Colglazier =

American physicist (born 1944)

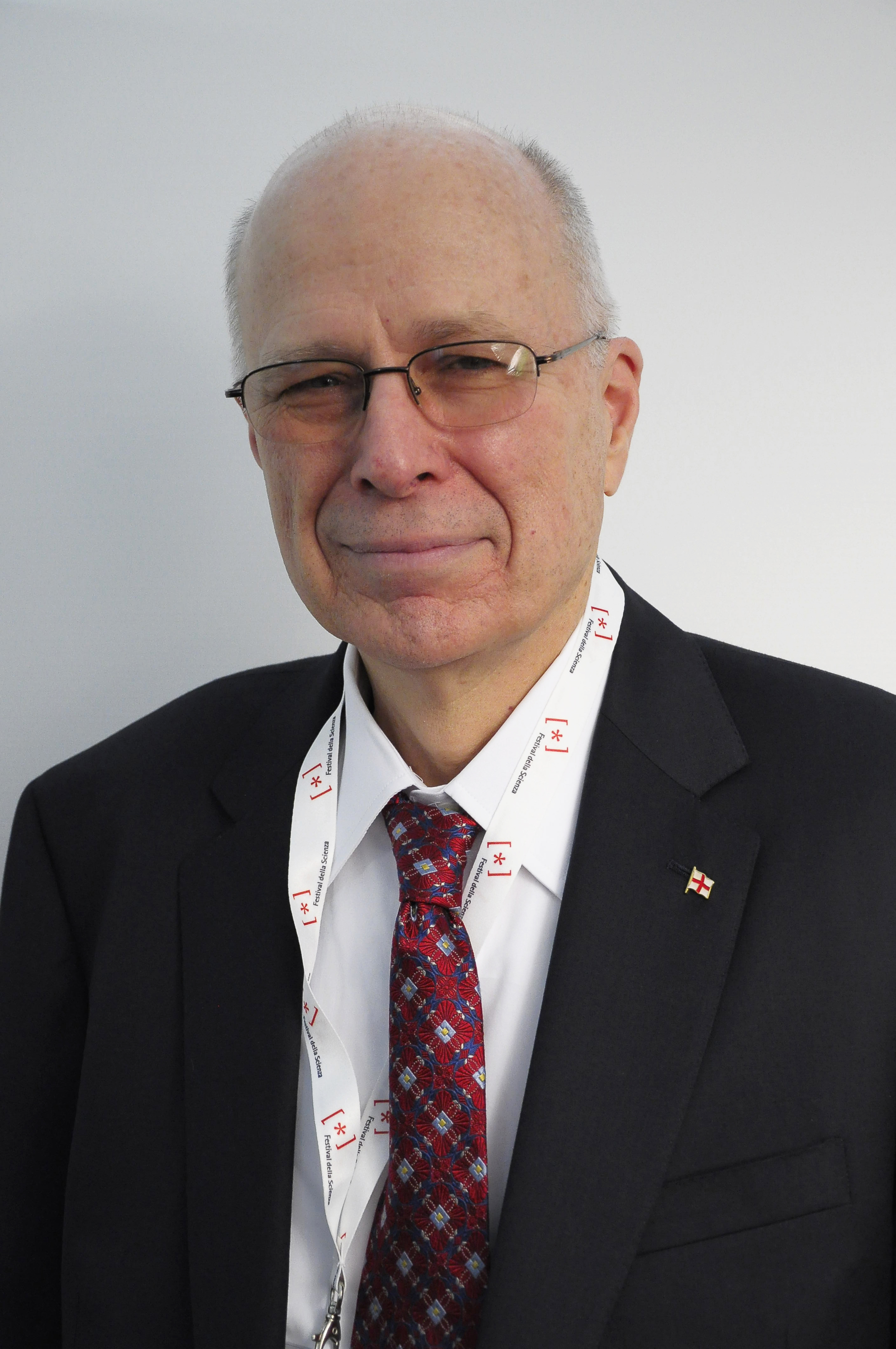
- Colglazier in 2011

4th Science and Technology Adviser to the Secretary of State
- Preceded by: Nina Federoff
- Succeeded by: Vaughan Turekian

Personal details
- Born: November 24, 1944 (age 80)
- Spouse: Catherine (nee Clark)
- Children: 2
- Education: California Institute of Technology (PhD)

Elmer William Colglazier (born November 24, 1944) is an American physicist, best known as the fourth science and technology adviser to the U.S. Secretary of State from 2011 to 2014. In that role, he has written about the benefits of science diplomacy.

Colglazier received his Ph.D. in theoretical physics from the California Institute of Technology in 1971. He then worked at the Stanford Linear Accelerator Center, the Institute for Advanced Study in Princeton, and the Center for Science and International Affairs at Harvard's Kennedy School of Government. While at Harvard, he also served as associate director of the Program in Science, Technology, and Humanism of the Aspen Institute. In 1976 and 1977, he was an AAAS Congressional Science Fellow working for Congressman George Brown.

From 1983 to 1991, he was professor of physics and director of the Energy, Environment, and Resources Center at the University of Tennessee, where he worked closely with scientists at Oak Ridge National Laboratory. From 1991 to 1994, Colglazier was executive director of the Office of International Affairs of the National Academy of Sciences (NAS) and National Academies of Sciences (NRC).

From 1994 to 2011, Colglazier served as executive officer of the NAS and NRC. From 2000 to 2011, he also served as NRC's chief operating officer.

Colglazier has been married to Catherine Clark Colglazier, former teacher and Humanities Manager at Thomas Jefferson High School for Science and Technology in Alexandria, Virginia for 50 years. They have two married children: Geraldine Tunnell, Senior VP for Marketing at Dell, and Will Colglazier, US History teacher at Aragon High School (CA). He resides in McLean, VA.
