= William Joseph Bryan =

American hypnotist (1926–1977)

- Born: 1926
- Died: March 4, 1977 (aged 50); Las Vegas, Nevada, U.S.
- Occupation: Physician

William Joseph Bryan Jr. (1926–1977) was an American physician and a pioneering hypnotist. He was one of the founders of modern hypnotherapy and his work notably found use in psychological warfare during the Cold War. He was a distant relative of United States Secretary of State William Jennings Bryan.

== Early life ==
Bryan was originally from the Midwest, the seventh-generation M.D. in his family. Bryan was a first cousin twice removed of United States Secretary of State William Jennings Bryan, who was his grandfather's cousin. Bryan claimed to have once worked as a drummer for Tommy Dorsey.

== Career and work ==
William Joseph Bryan Jr. held an MD, JD, and PhD. He started his career as a military psychiatrist, claiming in a 1972 interview on KNX radio to have been the "chief of all medical survival training for the United States Air Force during the Korean War ... which meant the brainwashing section." Later in the same interview, Bryan detailed the brainwashing process:

"You have to have the person locked up physically, to have control over them; you have to use a certain amount of physical torture ... and there is also the use of long-term hypnotic suggestion ... probably drugs ... whatever and so on. Under these situations, where you have all this going for you, like in a prison camp and so on, yes, you can brainwash a person to do just about anything. What I'm speaking about are the innumerable instances we ran into when I was running the country's brainwashing and anti-brainwashing programs."

Bryan was involved in research for the CIA, including the Project ARTICHOKE and its successor, the Project MKUltra (popularly known as the CIA's mind control program), a research project into behavioral engineering of humans. As part of his work for the CIA, he developed techniques of what he called "hypno-conditioning." His published research from the era focused on the forensic and military range of psychological research. He would later focus on legal hypnosis.

Bryan considered himself to be the "leading expert in the world" on hypnosis. He developed his own system of hypnoanalysis called the 'Bryan method'. On May 4, 1955, Bryan founded the American Institute of Hypnosis, and was editor of the institute's Journal of the American Institute of Hypnosis. He specialized in sex therapy and criminology. He designed a switchboard of electronic instruments he called the Bryan Electronic Automated Robot (BEAR), which he claimed allowed him to hypnotize and simultaneously monitor feedback from three different clients by using a control room, televisions, and multiple tape decks. Bryan defined hypnosis as "increased concentration of the mind ... increased relaxation of the body ... and an increased susceptibility to suggestion." Bryan believed sex was essential to his practice, once telling a Playboy interviewer: "I enjoy variety and I like to get to know people on a deep emotional level. One way of getting to know people is through intercourse." In one of his most famous cases, Bryan was brought in by attorney F. Lee Bailey and subjected Albert DeSalvo to hypnosis, under which DeSalvo confessed to the Boston Strangler murders. In 1970, Bryan claimed to have hypnoanalzyed more than 15,000 patients and was earning in excess of a quarter of a million dollars per year. He operated out of his organization's headquarters at 8833 Sunset Boulevard in Los Angeles, and had branch offices in San Francisco, San Diego and Atlanta.

Although uncredited, Bryan publicly claimed that he was the technical advisor for John Frankenheimer's film The Manchurian Candidate (1962). He was officially credited as technical advisor on Roger Corman's Tales of Terror (1962) and on Francis Ford Coppola's Dementia 13 (1963).

== Sexual abuse of female patients ==
In 1969, the California State Board of Medical Examiners found Bryan guilty of "unprofessional conduct in four cases involving sexual molesting of female patients" he had hypnotized to cure their "sexual disorders". He was given five years' probation.

== Sirhan Sirhan conspiracy theory ==
William Turner and Jonn Christian hypothesized in their 1978 book The Assassination of Robert F. Kennedy that Bryan was responsible for inducing Sirhan Sirhan to fire blanks at Robert F. Kennedy with posthypnotic suggestion. Turner and Christian first suspected a connection between Bryan and Sirhan in 1976 after noticing notebook entries written by Sirhan that referenced "AMORC AMORC Salvo Salvo Di Di Salvo Die S Salvo". Speaking with Turner at San Quentin, Sirhan insisted he had no idea who Albert DeSalvo was. Turner and Christian questioned why the name appears in his notebook if he didn't know who DeSalvo was. They cite Bryan's reputation for constantly boasting about his work with DeSalvo and suggest that Sirhan might have heard the name while under hypnosis. They cite Dr. Herbert Spiegel, who told them "anything mentioned to a subject under hypnosis was automatically etched in their subconscious." The book also mentions that "only hours" after the shooting of Robert F. Kennedy and before Sirhan was identified as the shooter, Bryan appeared on the Los Angeles radio station KABC-AM, where he told show host Ray Briem that the suspect likely acted under posthypnotic suggestion.

British author Peter Evans, in his 2004 book Nemesis, also identified Bryan as being the one who hypnotized Sirhan.

In a 1974 interview, researcher Betsy Langman asked Bryan whether he believed Sirhan used self-hypnosis, to which Bryan responded, "I'm not going to comment on that case, because I didn't hypnotize him." Bryan abruptly declared that the interview was over after accusing, "You are going around trying to find some more ammunition to put out that same old crap—that people can be hypnotized into doing all these weird things."

== Personal life ==
Los Angeles Times sportswriter Jim Murray interviewed Bryan in 1963 and described him: "He is blond, round-faced (with a belly to match), he always talks as if a crowd had gathered. He has about as many self-doubts as Cassius Clay and can hypnotize himself at will, except he should do it more often when the mashed potatoes are coming." In an October 1970 interview in Esquire, writer David Slavitt described Bryan as being a "huge man, three hundred pounds of flesh and a great booming voice".

Bryan was an ordained priest in the Old Roman Catholic Church and frequently preached at fundamentalist churches in Southern California. He believed prayer to be a form of hypnotism and suggested that the prophets underwent a form of autohypnosis: "In the Middle Ages, most of the prophets who heard the voice of God actually dissociated their own voices and heard themselves."

At the time of his death, Bryan was married to his wife, Savilla, and had two daughters.

== Death ==
Bryan was reportedly found dead in a hotel room at the Riviera in Las Vegas on March 4, 1977, of a suspected heart attack. He was 50 years old. He was buried in Hollywood. Celebrity attorney Melvin Belli was a pallbearer at his service.

== Bibliography ==
- Legal Aspects of Hypnosis, 1962
- Religious Aspects of Hypnosis, 1962. Republished as Leave Something to God by Relaxed Books 1998, Winfield, IL
- The New Self-Hypnosis, 1967 (with Paul Adams)
- The Chosen Ones: Or, The Psychology of Jury Selection, 1971
