= Respiratory Medicine =

- Discipline: Respiratory medicine
- Language: English
- Edited by: Nicola Hanania

Publication details
- Former names: British Journal of Tuberculosis; British Journal of Tuberculosis and Diseases of the Chest; British Journal of Diseases of the Chest
- History: 1907–present
- Publisher: Elsevier
- Frequency: 15/year
- Impact factor: 3.415 (2020)

Standard abbreviations
- ISO 4: Respir. Med.

Indexing
- CODEN: RMEDEY
- ISSN: 0954-6111 (print); 1532-3064 (web)
- OCLC no.: 1004973654

Links
- Journal homepage; Online access; Online archive

Respiratory Medicine is a monthly peer-reviewed medical journal published by Elsevier covering research in pulmonology. According to the Journal Citation Reports, Respiratory Medicine has a 2020 impact factor of 3.415.
