= Molecular and Cellular Biochemistry =

- Discipline: Biochemistry, cytology, molecular biology
- Language: English
- Edited by: Roberto Bolli, Luigi Ippolito, Vladislav Volarevic

Publication details
- History: 1973-present
- Publisher: Springer Science+Business Media
- Impact factor: 4.3 (2022)

Standard abbreviations
- ISO 4: Mol. Cell. Biochem.

Indexing
- ISSN: 0300-8177 (print); 1573-4919 (web)

Links
- Journal homepage; Online access

Molecular and Cellular Biochemistry is a peer-reviewed scientific journal covering research in cellular biology and biochemistry. It was a successor to the journal Enzymologia and was established in 1973 to make "it possible to extend the potentialities of the periodical".

== Abstracting and indexing ==
The journal is abstracted and indexed in:

- Academic OneFile
- AGRICOLA
- Biochemistry and Biophysics Citation Index
- Biological Abstracts
- BIOSIS Previews
- Biotechnology Citation Index
- CAB Abstracts
- CAB International
- Chemical Abstracts Service
- ChemWeb
- Current Awareness in Biological Sciences
- Current Contents/Life Sciences
- Elsevier BIOBASE
- EMBASE
- EMBiology
- Food Science and Technology Abstracts
- Global Health
- INIS Atomindex
- ProQuest
- PubMed/MEDLINE
- Science Citation Index
- Scopus
- TOC Premier
- VINITI Database RAS

According to the Journal Citation Reports, the journal had a 2011 impact factor of 2.057. It has a 2021 impact factor of 3.842 according to its website https://www.springer.com/journal/11010.
