= Drug Research (journal) =

- Discipline: Pharmacology
- Language: English
- Edited by: Vivan Malhotra

Publication details
- Former name(s): Arzneimittelforschung
- History: 1951–present
- Publisher: Thieme Medical Publishers
- Frequency: Monthly
- Impact factor: 0.701 (2014)

Standard abbreviations
- ISO 4: Drug Res.

Indexing
- CODEN: ARZNAD
- ISSN: 0004-4172 (print); 1616-7066 (web)
- OCLC no.: 01514393

Links
- Journal homepage

Drug Research is a peer-reviewed medical journal covering drug development published by Thieme Medical Publishers. The journal was established in 1951 and the editor-in-chief is Martin Wehling (Heidelberg University Faculty of Medicine in Mannheim).

== Abstracting and indexing ==
Drug Research is abstracted and indexed in:

- Biological Abstracts
- Chemical Abstracts
- Excerpta Medica
- Index Medicus
- Nuclear Science Abstracts

According to the Journal Citation Reports, it has a 2014 impact factor of 0.701, ranking it 121st out of 157 journals in the category "Chemistry, multidisciplinary" and 229th out of 254 journals in the category "Pharmacology & Pharmacy".
