= Branimir Jelić =

Croatian politician (1905–1972)

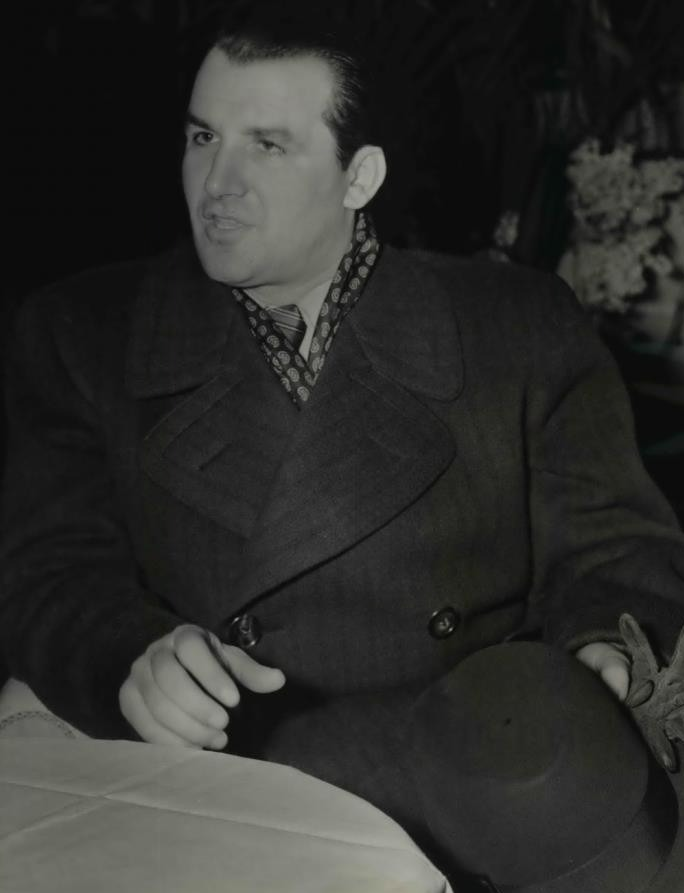
Jelić in 1929

Branimir "Branko" Jelić (28 February 1905 – 31 May 1972) was an exiled Croatian nationalist and doctor of medicine. He was a member of the fascist Ustaše organization.

== Biography ==
=== Political activities in Croatia ===
Branimir Jelić was born in Donji Dolac in 1905, at the time in the Kingdom of Dalmatia, Austria-Hungary, passing to Yugoslavia after World War I. He was the fourth child out of eight in the family of Ivan Jelić and Iva Jelić (born Simunić). Already as a pupil he contributed to the 1922/23 election campaign of the Croatian Bloc, opposing the legal state. During his studies of medicine in Zagreb he supported the Croatian Party of Rights. In early 1926 his father died in police custody.

In summer 1927 he became president of the Croatian Party of Rights student organization and thus a junior partner of Ante Pavelić who was a Zagreb deputy for the party. In autumn 1928 Jelić took a lead in the foundation of the militant youth organization Hrvatski Domobran with the aim of establishing a Greater Croatia. He became chief editor of the affiliated paper. Meanwhile, the political climate in the South Slav state roughened due to the assassination of Stjepan Radić, the leader of the Croatian Peasant Party. King Alexander suspended the constitution and dissolved the parliament, instituting the 6 January Dictatorship.

=== In exile (first decade) ===
Jelić, alongside Pavelić, left Yugoslavia in early 1929 for Austria where he finished his doctorate in Graz. He continued his efforts for Croatian national independence, resulting in political pressure from Belgrade passed on by the Austrian government. In the early 1930s Pavelić sent him to South America for agitation among the Croatian émigrés. In this time Jelić edited the Croatian nationalist exile paper Nezavisna Hrvatska Država (lit. 'The Independent Croatian State') which was also distributed in the US through a middleman. Jelić's mission in the Americas was to establish branches of the Hrvatski Domobran. He frequently consulted Pavelić in Italy and became his right-hand man overseas. The Hrvatski Domobran developed into an organizational backbone of Pavelić's Ustaša underground militia in Europe (for which Jelić recruited personnel). Throughout the 1930s Jelić sojourned in South America, Austria again (in mid-1932), Berlin (July 1932 – spring 1934), USA (until October 1934), Italy (until April 1936), Germany (until early 1939), USA (until September 1939) and Gibraltar (October 1939 – June 1940). On his way back from the US in autumn 1939, Jelić was intercepted by the British Navy at Gibraltar and taken into custody. This was a service of the British government to demonstrate its goodwill for Royal Yugoslavia. Jelić's activities abroad were linked with Nazi Germany, giving rise to keep him prisoner.

=== In exile (second decade) ===
In June 1940, Jelić was taken to a camp on the Isle of Man, where he was imprisoned until late 1945. Thus, he was prevented from taking a high position among the leadership of the Axis puppet-state Independent State of Croatia (Nezavisna Država Hrvatska, NDH).

After being released he continued his nationalist networking in London and established contacts to like-minded Croats as well as personalities of anti-Communist leanings. The Security Service (MI5) came to the conclusion that he served as "a focal point" for worldwide Croatian exile activities. He tried to intervene at the British government in favour of Croatian political refugees, most of them Ustaše and their kin, who were threatened by Tito's Yugoslavia. Finally in May 1949 Jelić was allowed to enter West Berlin.

=== In Germany (1949–1972) ===
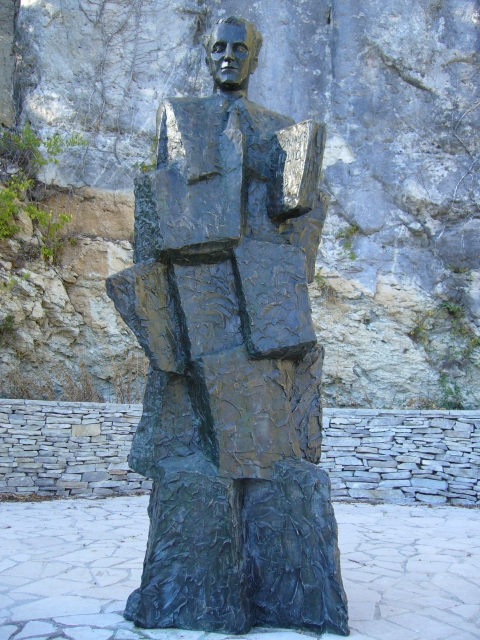
Monument to Branimir Jelić in Donji Dolac

Together with prominent Croatian exiles, mostly belonging to the former NDH elite (including his brother Ivan, Mate Frković, Ernest Bauer, Stjepan Buć, and Krunoslav Draganović), Jelić founded the Munich-based Croatian National Committee (Hrvatski narodni odbor, HNO), trying to draw the attention of Western politicians to their cause. In search for political support the HNO came to an agreement with representatives of the former German minority in Croatia. By the late 1950s the HNO underwent an ongoing crisis. Nevertheless, Jelić, as an exile of the first generation and the publisher of Hrvatska Država (lit. 'The Croatian State'), continued to be an outstanding spokesman among the Croatian independence activists abroad. He obtained German citizenship and participated in right-wing party politics. At the beginning of the 1970s he attracted wider attention by claiming Soviet support for his plans of an independent Croatian state. In the early 1970s he survived two assassination attempts in West Berlin (most probably organized by the Yugoslav secret service known as UDBA) and died a sudden death after he had returned from a fundraising tour to North America.
