= 2019–2020 measles outbreak in the Democratic Republic of the Congo =

Measles epidemic in the DRC in 2019

- Disease: Measles
- Dates: Early 2019 – August 24, 2020
- Confirmed cases: 380,766
- Deaths: >7,018

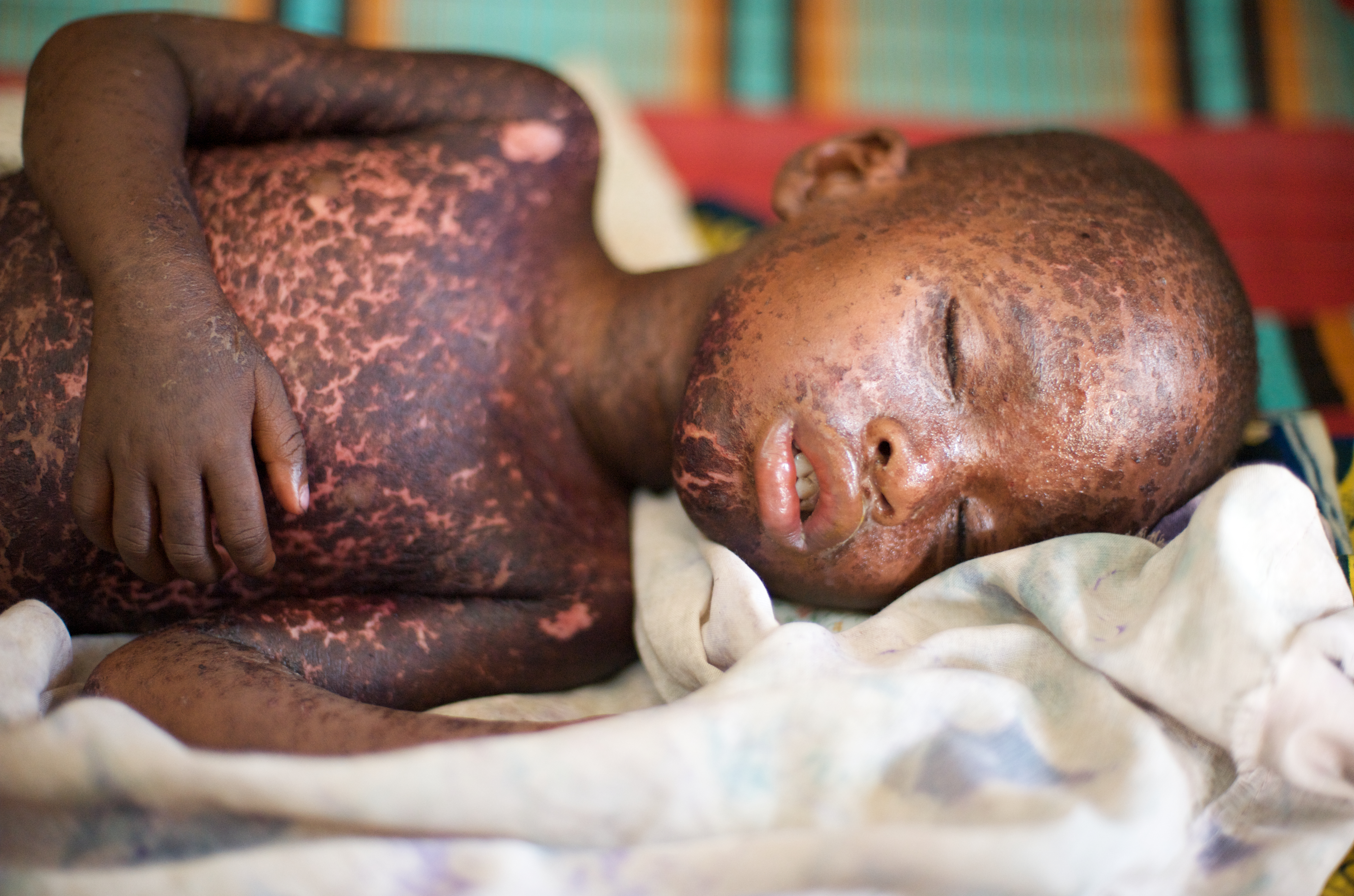
African child with measles

In 2019, a measles epidemic broke out in the Democratic Republic of the Congo (DRC). The epidemic started in early 2019 in the southeast corner of the DRC and then spread to all provinces. By June 2019 the epidemic was reported to have exceeded the death toll of the concurrent Ebola epidemic. By April 2020, it had infected more than 341,000 people and claimed about 6,400 fatalities. This has primarily affected children under the age of five, representing 74% of infections and nearly 90% of deaths.

== Response ==
In response, a vaccination program had been set up by the Ministry of Public Health with the aim to vaccinate more than 20 million children under the age of five. In 2018, the measles vaccination rate was 57%. The effort is supported by the Measles & Rubella Initiative, the World Health Organization, UNICEF, and GAVI, a vaccine alliance. Also, Médecins Sans Frontières started conducting vaccination campaigns. Vaccination programs have been hampered by access to health resources, lack of resources, security issues, and mistrust.

The measles outbreak in the DRC has been the largest and most fatal measles outbreak across the world in 2019.

In April 2020, it was reported that due to the outbreak of the COVID-19 pandemic, the vaccination program for measles was suspended.

On 24 August 2020, the outbreak was declared over with final results of over 380,766 cases and 7,018 deaths.

== 2021 Flare-up ==
By April 2021 Doctors without Borders had reported on more than 13,000 new cases in several provinces of the DRC since the beginning of the year.

== See also ==
- List of epidemics
- 2019 Samoa measles outbreak
- 2019 Tonga measles outbreak
- 2019 New Zealand measles outbreak
- 2019 Philippines measles outbreak
- Measles resurgence in the United States
- Vaccination
- Vaccine hesitancy
