= 2018 Madagascar measles outbreak =

Measles outbreak in Antananarivo, Madagascar

- Disease: Measles
- Pathogen: Measles morbillivirus
- Location: Madagascar
- Index case: 3 family members in Antananarivo-Renivohitra District
- Dates: September 2018–present
- Confirmed cases: 118,000+
- Deaths: 1,688+

In early September 2018, cases of measles began to appear in Antananarivo, Madagascar. The capital's health authorities, challenged by the district's poverty and Madagascar's relatively-low vaccination rate, were unable to contain the highly-contagious disease, and what followed became the largest measles outbreak yet in Madagascar's history. With more than 115,000 people infected and more than 1,200 dying, the outbreak has become Madagascar's most serious outbreak of measles in the 21st century.

== Outbreak ==
Measles cases were first detected in the urban, downtown district of Antananarivo-Renivohetra on 3 September 2018. At the time, health authorities were still heavily engaged in the remnants of the previous year's plague epidemic, and public resources were identified to tracking down remaining cases. On 4 October, the Institute Pasteur de Madagascar confirmed the presence of measles morbillivirus in samples from 3 patients and identified the B3 strain. The virus had already spread outwards to the capital's Atsimondrano, Avaradrano, and Ambohidratrimo districts, and by 18 November there were over 3,200 recorded cases in Madagascar.

== Response ==
Measles immunity rates are below average in Madagascar at 83%, versus the 95% recommended by the World Health Organization. Availability of the MMR vaccine is patchy in Madagascar due to the island's mountainous geography, presenting a challenge to distributors.

== See also ==
- 2019 Philippines measles outbreak
- 2019 Samoa measles outbreak
- 2019 New Zealand measles outbreak
- Measles resurgence in the United States
