= 2019–2020 outbreak (disambiguation) =

The COVID-19 pandemic is an ongoing coronavirus outbreak that began in 2019.

2019–2020 outbreak may also refer to:

- 2019–20 locust infestation
- 2019–2020 measles outbreak in the Democratic Republic of the Congo
- 2019–2020 New Zealand measles outbreak
- 2019–20 Philippines polio outbreak
- 2019–2020 vaping lung illness outbreak
