= 2025 Southwest United States measles outbreak =

Disease outbreak in the United States

2025–26 United States measles outbreak
- Disease: Measles
- Pathogen: Measles morbillivirus
- Location: United States (Texas, New Mexico, Oklahoma, Kansas), Mexico (Chihuahua)
- First reported: January 17, 2025
- Index case: Unidentified
- Confirmed cases: 762
- Hospitalized cases: 99
- Deaths: 3
- Vaccinations: Measles vaccine

In January 2025, cases of measles began to appear in Texas and neighboring states in the United States. The outbreak became one of the largest in the country since 2000, when the United States declared the disease eliminated in the country. The outbreak was declared over on August 18, 2025.

Gaines County became the epicenter of the outbreak. By mid-February, the disease had spread to New Mexico and other communities in West Texas including Dallam, Dawson, Ector, Lynn, Terry, and Yoakum. In March, cases linked to the outbreak were announced in Oklahoma, the Mexican state of Chihuahua, and Kansas. Cases were concentrated in the Texas Mennonite community, and officials believed the disease was first imported from an outbreak in a Mennonite community in Ontario, Canada.

The outbreak was confirmed to have infected hundreds of individuals and suspected to have infected many more. More than 99 individuals were hospitalized, and three died: two children in Lubbock (a six-year-old and an eight-year-old) and an adult in Lea County, New Mexico. All three fatalities were unvaccinated individuals.

Measles is highly contagious and preventable by the MMR vaccine. Though the United States declared measles eliminated in 2000, waning vaccination rates had led to its resurgence in the country. By the end of 2025, the CDC confirmed 2,255 measles cases across 44 states and nearly 50 separate outbreaks.

== Background ==
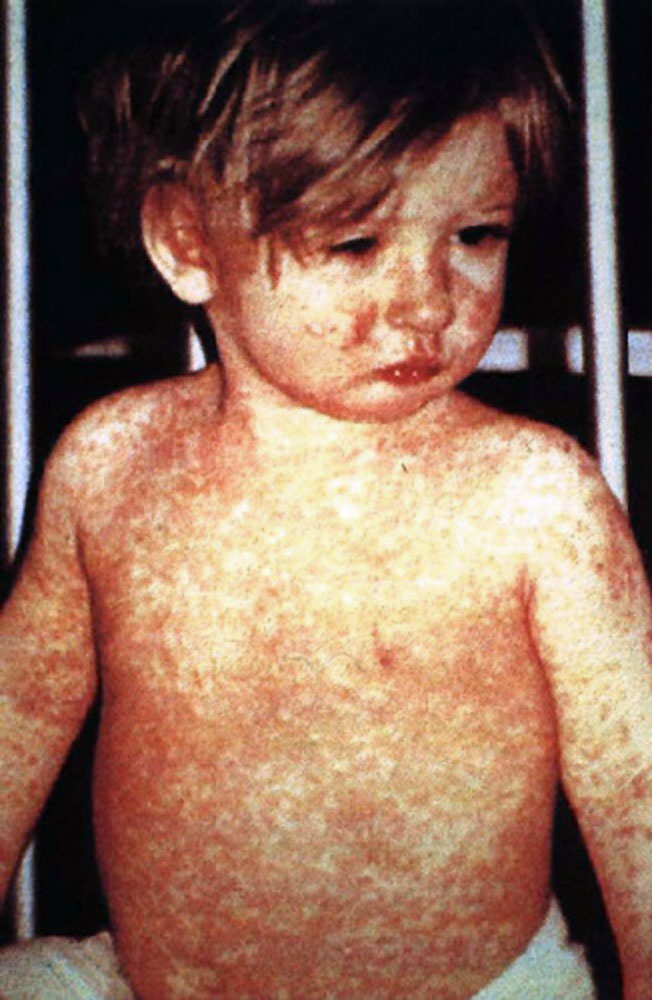
Measles rash shown on child. The rash typically appears after four days

In the United States, before the measles vaccination program started in 1963, the Centers for Disease Control and Prevention (CDC) estimated that about three to four million people were infected each year, of which approximately 500,000 were reported, with 400 to 500 people dying and 48,000 being hospitalized. Measles is one of the most contagious viruses, and can be passed through respiratory droplets in the air, with unvaccinated individuals at 90% risk of getting measles if they are exposed. Symptoms usually develop 10–12 days after exposure to an infected person and last 7–10 days. Initial symptoms typically include fever, often greater than 40 °C (104 °F), cough, runny nose, and inflamed eyes, with a red, flat rash which usually starts on the face and then spreads to the rest of the body.

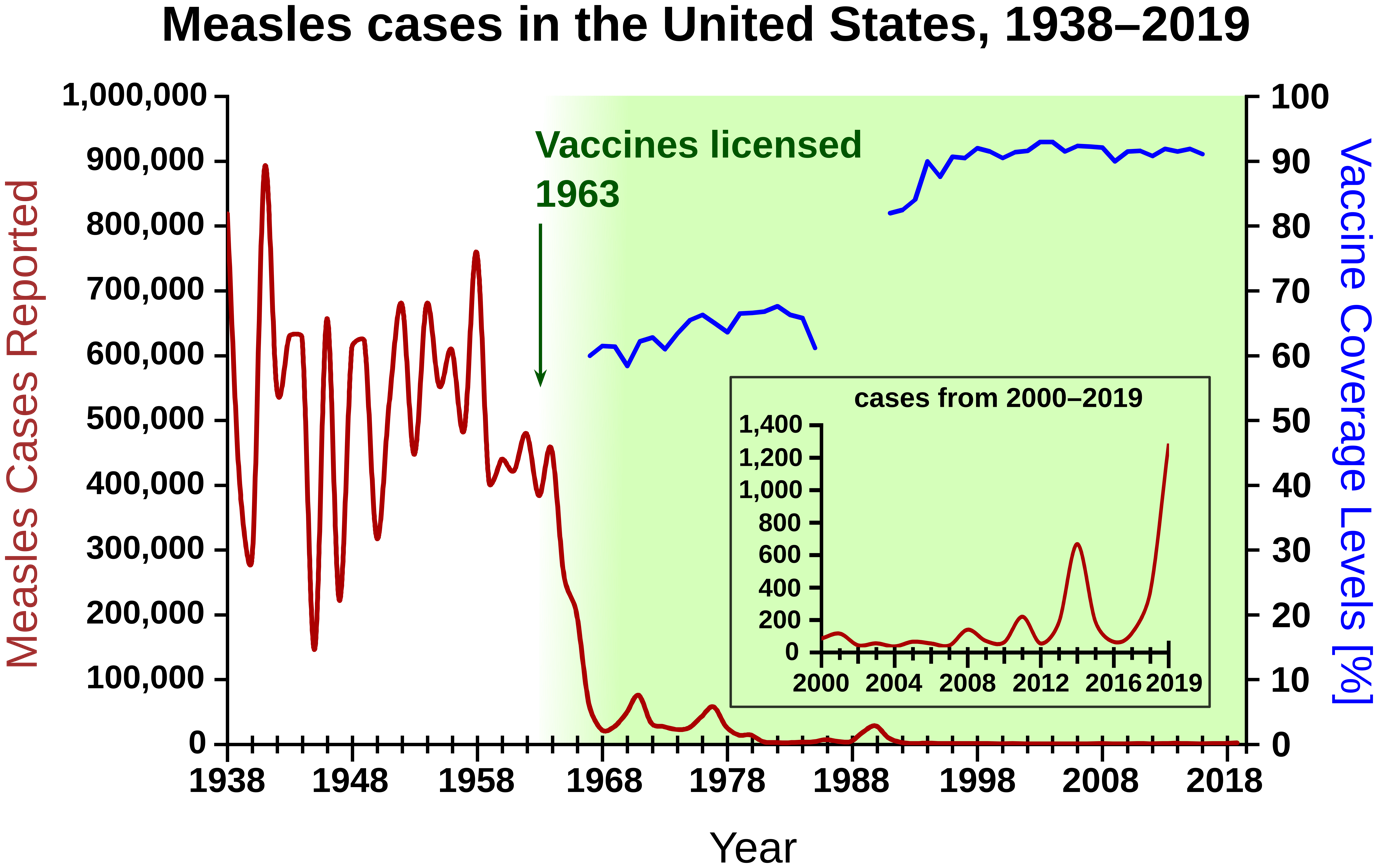
Graph showing the numbers of reported cases of measles between 1938-2019

The MMR vaccine is a safe and effective preventative measure against measles with the first dose given to children between 12 and 15 months of age and a second dose between 4 and 6 years. Though measles was eliminated in the United States in 2000, falling vaccination rates have contributed to its resurgence. Vaccination rates among children have dropped since the COVID-19 pandemic and most states have dropped below the 95% threshold considered effective to prevent community outbreaks. Falling vaccination rates have been tied to increased skepticism about vaccines.

The high rate of vaccination exemptions in Gaines County, Texas, has been blamed for the outbreak. It has one of the highest rates of vaccine opt-outs among children in Texas, with nearly 14% skipping a required vaccine in the prior school year. Only 77% of kindergartners in Gaines County had received measles vaccinations during the 2024–2025 school year, according to DSHS surveys; a 95% vaccination rate is required for herd immunity. The outbreak has been concentrated in a Mennonite community known to be under-vaccinated.

== Epidemiology ==
About 90 percent of cases in Texas’s outbreak were centered in West Texas; 54 percent were concentrated in Gaines County. U.S. officials suggested the outbreak was related to one which began in Canada in autumn 2024.

The Texas outbreak involved the measles genotype D8, and was linked to cases in New Mexico, Kansas, Oklahoma, and Chihuahua, Mexico. The outbreak predominantly affected unvaccinated Mennonite communities.

As of March 7, 2025, 228 cases have been confirmed. In mid-February, it was reported that of the reported cases 39 were aged between 0–4 years old, 62 were aged 5–17 years old, 18 were aged 18 and older, with five cases not completely age identified. Since there have been two deaths and the fatality rate of measles is estimated to be around one to three deaths per 1000, epidemiologists suspect the number of cases could be much higher. The outbreak came amid sporadic smaller outbreaks across the United States. The majority of cases have been in children who are unvaccinated or of unknown vaccination status, with a hospitalization rate of 17%.

=== Texas ===
On January 17, 2025, the Houston Health Department confirmed two cases of measles, the first reported cases in Houston since 2018. The patients were in the same household and had recently traveled internationally. Two cases in unvaccinated school-age children in Lubbock, Texas, were later confirmed; the last case of measles in Lubbock County was reported in 2004. The first child in Lubbock had contracted the disease after sitting in an emergency room with another child who was sick. The children resided in Gaines County. By February 7, the number of confirmed cases had increased to nine with three probable cases, before reaching fourteen confirmed cases with six probable cases.

By mid February it was reported that the outbreak had spread to nine Texas counties mostly concentrated in the rural South Plains region, with counties including Dallam, Dawson, Ector, Gaines, Lubbock, Lynn, Terry, and Yoakum. It was reported on February 24, that a person with measles had traveled outside of the outbreak area, to visit the campus of University of Texas at San Antonio and other local establishments. By late February more than 20 patients have been hospitalized at Covenant Children's Hospital. Some of them were suffering bacterial pneumonia and were requiring intubation to breathe.

On February 26, an unvaccinated six-year-old girl died of measles in Lubbock, the first death attributed to the outbreak. She had been sick for three weeks before being put on a ventilator and succumbing to pneumonia. She was the first measles death in the country since 2015. In a media interview less than a month later, the girl's father commented that "vaccination has stuff we don't trust ... We don't like the vaccinations, what they have these days. We heard too much, and we saw too much." Also in the same time period, the girl's father and mother, who are Mennonites, both appeared on video for a video interview by anti-vaccine organisation Children's Health Defense, where the father said that "measles are good for the body", while the mother told other parents regarding the measles, mumps and rubella vaccine: "Don't do the shots", with measles being "not as bad as they’re making it out to be."

On April 3, an eight-year-old girl died of "measles pulmonary failure" in Lubbock, marking the second child death from the outbreak and the third death overall. She was not vaccinated.

Texas declared their outbreak over as of August 18, 2025 after a total of 762 reported cases.

=== New Mexico ===
New Mexico health officials began checking residents for measles on February 3. On March 6, an unvaccinated adult in Lea County died and was later revealed to have contracted measles prior to his death.

=== Oklahoma ===
The first two cases linked to the outbreak were identified in Oklahoma on March 11.

=== Kansas ===
By March 28, 23 cases had been confirmed in Kansas; 21 of the cases were in children, and 20 of the total cases were in unvaccinated individuals. Genetic analyses suggest they were related to the Texas outbreak, but the exact exposure is not known.

=== Chihuahua ===
The Mexican state of Chihuahua, where the vaccination rate is at 75%, identified 15 cases of measles in Cuauhtémoc and one in Namiquipa on March 12. The outbreak was concentrated in a Mennonite community whose members regularly travel to Texas to visit family and carry out business.

Chihuahua health officials traced their first case to an 8-year-old Mennonite child who visited family in Seminole, Texas, a city in Gaines County. The child became sick and then spread the virus at school. As of August 19, 2025, the day after Texas declared their outbreak over, the outbreak in Chihuahua stood at 3,872 confirmed cases and 13 deaths.

=== Other outbreaks ===
In 2025, the CDC confirmed 2,255 measles cases across 44 states and nearly 50 separate outbreaks. On January 5, 2026, three additional cases were reported in Platte County, Nebraska, bringing the total number of cases in the state to four, all within the same household. Three cases were also reported in Buncombe County, North Carolina, on January 6 during an ongoing outbreak. The health department traced the outbreak to a Mission Health emergency room in Asheville. Following a surge in cases, there were 310 cases in North Carolina alone as of January 12. Nearby, there were 434 cases in South Carolina, including 409 people in quarantine, as of January 15. The state health department renewed efforts to bring both the MMR vaccine to residents using mobile clinics. In total, the CDC reported 416 new cases across 14 states in January.

== Responses ==
=== Federal ===
During a cabinet meeting on February 26, Robert F. Kennedy Jr., the United States secretary of health and human services (HHS), stated: "We are following the measles epidemic every day. Incidentally, there have been four measles outbreaks this year. In this country last year there were 16. So, it's not unusual. We have measles outbreaks every year." Kennedy, who is known for his anti-vaccine activism and history of downplaying measles resurgences, also stated incorrectly that there were two deaths and that the hospitalizations were for quarantine purposes. Only one death had been recorded at that time, and officials in Lubbock stated that they do not hospitalize patients for quarantine purposes. The officials stated that the children who were admitted were having difficulty breathing (with some requiring intensive care and supplemental oxygen). They added that all of the admitted children were unvaccinated. Senator Bill Cassidy, who chaired the Senate health committee, tweeted that the death was "absolutely devastating" and encouraged parents to vaccinate their children.

Infectious disease experts Cameron Wolfe of Duke University, David Higgins of the University of Colorado, and former head of the National Immunization Program Walter Orenstein objected to Kennedy's description of the outbreak as "not unusual" and stated the child's death was fully preventable with proper vaccination. Ali S. Khan, the former Director of the Office of Public Health Preparedness and Response at the Centers for Disease Control and Prevention (CDC) called for political officials at all levels to promote vaccination. In contrast to the 2019 New York measles outbreak—when CDC officials and Health Secretary Alex Azar urged vaccination—the CDC and Health Secretary did not release statements or make posts on social media urging vaccination. On March 4, the CDC, which had been providing MMR vaccines and lab support, posted on X that the Epidemic Intelligence Service would be helping the Texas State Department of Health. The organization also began planning a large-scale study of vaccines and autism, though extensive research has shown no connection between the two.

Kennedy published an opinion piece about the outbreak on the Fox News website on March 2. He suggested parents consult with healthcare providers about vaccination, but did not explicitly recommend it, stating the choice was "personal". He also promoted vitamin A supplementation and, in later interviews, cod liver oil, neither of which are effective treatments. Infectious disease specialists interviewed by Stat interpreted Kennedy's column as echoing the messages of anti-vaccine activists, who emphasize nutrition, supplementation, and parental choice over vaccination. Kennedy gave an interview to Fox News' Marc Siegel on March 8 in which he made numerous false claims including that it is "almost impossible" for healthy individuals to die from infectious disease and that the child who died may have been malnourished, despite health official's statements that she had no underlying conditions. Kennedy's promotion of unproven treatments for measles during the outbreak was cited as one of the reasons for the resignation of Kevin Griffis, the CDC communications director.

In April, federal budget cuts led to layoffs of frontline workers and the cancellation of over 50 measles vaccination clinics in Texas, many of which were planned in areas with low vaccination rates. After a second child died of measles, Kennedy attended her funeral. He met with the families of both children who died of measles, stated that the CDC would redeploy a team to Texas at the request of governor Greg Abbott, and that HHS would follow the state's lead.

Afterwards Kennedy posted on X that "the most effective way to prevent the spread of measles is the MMR vaccine" but again did not explicitly recommend it. He also praised two doctors (Ben Edwards and Richard Barlett) who had treated children with aerosolized budesonide (a steroid) and clarithromycin (an antibiotic)—which may weaken the immune system—as "extraordinary healers". Edwards had earlier in the outbreak described mass infections as "God's version of measles immunization", and Barlett had inaccurately promoted budesonide as a cure for COVID-19 and been disciplined in 2003 by the Texas Medical Board for "unusual use of risk-filled medications".

=== State and local ===
Following the initial outbreak in Texas, schools did not order unvaccinated students to stay home as it would require declaring a state of emergency. The Texas Department of State Health Services stated that such a declaration was not necessary since 90% of Texans are vaccinated; they ordered a 21-day quarantine for exposed unvaccinated individuals, but this would not be tracked or enforced. In rural Texas, the challenges of the outbreak were exacerbated by a lack of adequate public health infrastructure, primary care practitioners, and funding as 26 hospitals had closed between 2010 and 2020.

As news of the outbreak spread, health officials reported a rise in families deciding to vaccinate their children. The director of public health in Lubbock county stated that in the last week of February 2025 they had given approximately 100 doses of the MMR vaccine to children who had previously been unvaccinated or whose parents did not believe in vaccines. Vaccine-hesitant parents, including those who had sought exemptions for their children, were also bringing them to receive vaccines. High demand for vaccines caused shortages in some parts of Texas, particularly Austin. State vaccine registry data suggested there was a 10% increase in vaccination rates compared to 2024 in Gaines County. However, some families continued to refuse vaccines and instead opted for vitamin A supplements, cod liver oil, or budesonide—a steroid used for asthma—and supported Kennedy's stances. Multiple children treated for measles at Covenant Children's Hospital in Lubbock showed signs of liver damage, a symptom of vitamin A toxicity.

== See also ==
- 2019 Samoa measles outbreak
- 2025 Belize measles outbreak – linked to Chihuahua, Mexico
- Measles resurgence in the United States
- MMR vaccine
- Vaccine hesitancy
- History of public health in the United States
