= 2025 New Zealand measles outbreak =

Measles epidemic affecting New Zealand

Between September and November 2025, New Zealand experienced several cases of measles in Northland, Auckland, Wellington, Taranaki, Nelson–Marlborough, the Tasman District, and Manawatū–Whanganui. Notable locations of interest have included Wellington College, Wellington Girls' College and a Bluebridge ferry that travelled between Picton and Wellington on 3 October 2025. In early November 2025, Health New Zealand national director Dr Nick Chamberlain described the 2025 outbreak as the worst in the past two years. By 15 November, a total of 19 cases had been reported nationally. On 4 February 2026, Health New Zealand declared that the measles outbreak had ended, after 42 days had passed since the last confirmed case on 21 December 2025. There were 48 known cases during the outbreak.

== Background ==
=== History ===
New Zealand has experienced several measles outbreaks throughout its history. During the 19th century, thousands of Māori people died following contact with European settlers since they lacked natural immunity. In 1938, a measles outbreak killed 400 people in New Zealand.

During the 2019–2020 New Zealand measles outbreak, New Zealand reported between 2,185 and 2,213 measles cases nationwide. Almost 70% of these cases had never been vaccinated, with between 700 and 735 cases (35%) admitted to hospital. Two unborn babies also died in the 2019 outbreak. Measles imported from New Zealand via travel led to an outbreak in Samoa, which reported 5,707 cases, 1,800 hospitalisations and between 83 and 89 deaths. Most of the Samoan deaths were children under the age of five.

=== Vaccination policies and hesitancy ===
Under Health New Zealand's childhood schedule, infants are eligible to receive their first measles MMR vaccine dose when they are 12 months, followed by a second MMR dose at 15 months. People under the age of 18 years in New Zealand and some 18-year olds are eligible for free measles vaccines. According to The Spinoff, an average of 3,000 people in New Zealand received a measles vaccine each week. According to Health New Zealand national director Dr Nick Chamberlain, an outbreak is declared over if there have been no new transmissions 42 days after the last reported case went into isolation or was identified.

To achieve herd immunity and prevent community transmissions, 95% of the population needs to be vaccinated against measles and other communicable diseases. The national measles immunisation coverage rate among under-18 year olds dropped from 89 percent at the time of the 2019 measles outbreak to 77.5 percent in 2025. According to The Spinoff, 82% of two-years in New Zealand were vaccinated against measles by June 2025. Of this figure, 81% of Pasifika New Zealander two-year olds had been immunised against measles while 68.4% of Māori two-year olds had been immunised against measles. The public health service Health New Zealand has worked with Māori and Pasifika-led health providers to boost immunisation rates within those communities. While 90% of children under the age of two in the South Island had received the MMR vaccine as of October 2025, only 76% of two year olds in the North Island had received the MMR vaccine. According to University of Canterbury epidemiologist Dr Anna Howe, areas in New Zealand with low measles vaccination rates include Northland (62%) and the Lakes District (73%). Districts with vaccination rates of 90% have included Hutt Valley, Capital and Coast, and Canterbury.

Since the COVID-19 pandemic in New Zealand (2020–2022), there has been an increase in vaccine hesitancy due to a backlash within some sections of the public against vaccine mandates and the spread of anti-vaccination misinformation and disinformation. According to Auckland University of Technology researchers Jan Dewar, Denise Wilson, Gail Pacheco and Lisa Meehan, the introduction of vaccine mandates for health and workers in October 2021 led to a 15 percent decline in their employment rate and a 19 percent decline in their income, which has not fully recovered to pre-COVID levels despite the scrapping of vaccine mandates in September 2022. In mid-July 2025, RNZ reported an increase in vaccine decline rates among toddlers in some regions including the Northland Region (66.4 percent), the Gisborne District and Bay of Plenty (68 percent). Several health professionals including Nga Mataapuna Oranga primary health organisation Jackie Davis and University of Otago epidemiologist Professor Peter McIntyre attributed the vaccine decline rate to anti-vaccine misinformation on social media and distrust in the public health system daring back to the COVID-19 pandemic, particularly among Māori and Pasifika communities. University of Canterbury mathematician and modeling expert Dr Michael Plank expressed concern that MMR vaccination rates in New Zealand had declined between 2019 and 2019, and that community transmission could lead to higher hospitalisation rates and the deaths of children.

== Timeline ==
=== September ===
- 25 September – One new measles case linked to international travel was reported in the Northland Region's Bay of Islands. This case was no longer infectious and six contacts were assessed by health authorities.
- 28 September – Four measles cases (three historical and one linked to international travel) were reported in Northland.
- 30 September – A measles case linked to international travel was reported in Queenstown, bringing the total number of cases to five. Two new cases were reported in Northland, bringing the total number of cases in that region to six.

=== October ===
- 3 October – Three new measles cases were reported in Northland, bringing the total number of cases nationwide to ten.
- 6 October — One new measles case was confirmed in Northland over the weekend, bringing the total number of cases in the region to 10. In addition to the Queenstown case, this brings the number of cases nationally to 11.
- 13 October – One measles case was reported in Northland, bringing the total number of cases in that region to 12.
- 20 October – A measles case linked to international travel was reported in Auckland.
- 21 October – Two new measles cases were reported in Manawatū and one case in Nelson, bringing the total number of cases nationally to four.
- 24 October – Health New Zealand reported two new measles cases in Taranaki and Wellington, bringing the total number of known cases to eight. Health NZ also confirmed that a recent measles community outbreak was linked to a Northland patient who travelled aboard a Bluebridge ferry across the Cook Strait on 3 October.
- 26 October – Health NZ confirmed a measles case at Wellington Girls' College. Four staff and 60 students were identified as possible contacts of the patient.
- 27 October – Two new measles cases were reported in Wellington, bringing the total number of cases to 10. One case were linked to international travel while seven were linked to a "high-risk exposure event" on a Bluebridge ferry on 3 October. Health NZ identified several hundred close contacts at Wellington College.
- 30 October – Health New Zealand has confirmed two new cases of measles, bringing the total number of active cases to 13. The number of close contacts has risen to 2,142. Together with the 12 cases in the separate Northland outbreak, there were 25 known measles cases in New Zealand.
- 31 October – Auckland Grammar School instructed Years 9 and 10 students to remain at home after a student tested positive for measles, bringing the total number nationally to 14.

=== November ===
- 1 November – Two new cases (including a Wellington College student) were reported, bringing the total number of measles cases nationwide to 16.
- 2 November – A new measles case was reported in Auckland, bringing the total number of cases nationwide to 17. This case was linked to a previous overseas-acquired case. That same day, Wellington Girls' College confirmed it had 900 close contacts linked to a student who attended a prize giving ceremony.
- 6 November – Health New Zealand reported that the number of known measles cases remains 17 nationally, all of whom are no longer infectious. These 17 cases have generated 210 exposure events, with 122 of these remaining open. There were 16 asymptomatic contacts.
- 9 November — Health New Zealand reported a new measles case in Nelson, bringing the total number of cases to 18 nationally. The Nelson case was not linked to previous cases, leading health authorities to believe that undetected measles cases may be circulating in the community. 17 cases were no longer infectious.
- 15 November – Health New Zealand reported a new case at Wellington College, bringing the total number nationally to 19. The latest case was a student, connected to an earlier case, who had travelled to Asia.

=== December ===
- 3 December – Five new cases were reported, with three in Auckland, one in Waikato and one Dunedin. This brought the total number of cases to 27, with 22 no longer active.
- 6 December — A measles case is reported in Queenstown, bringing the total number of cases reported nationally to 30. 22 cases are no longer infectious.
- 7 December — Health New Zealand identifies 11 locations of interest in Nelson, Auckland's Karangahape Road, Frankton, the Dunedin Hospital, and Queenstown.
- 17 December — One new case of measles is reported in Queenstown, bringing the total number of cases nationwide to 32. Four cases are active at the time.

== Responses ==
By 10 October 2025, Health New Zealand had administered 7,000 MMR vaccines in response to the measles cases in Northland and Queenstown. In response to the first case in October 2025, the National Public Health Service led a national coordinated response to the measles outbreak by boosting its contact tracing staff capacity and expanding access to MMR vaccines.

On 27 October, Health New Zealand issued an advisory urging Nelson residents to be vigilant for measles symptoms and local exposure events in response to case confirmed in the city the previous week. During the fourth week of October, the NPHS gave out an addition 770 MMR doses in addition to its weekly average of 3,000 doses. By 30 October 2025, Health New Zealand had set up several pop-up serology clinics to offer free immunity level tests for people who had been exposed to known measles cases. One of these clinics was established at Wellington Girls' College, where dozens of students and staff were considered closed contacts.

On 3 November, Health Minister Simeon Brown confirmed that New Zealand had 117,000 MMR vaccines in storage, with 28,000 more doses expected to arrive in December 2025. Brown encouraged everyone to check they were fully vaccinated in order to combat the spread of measles. Drug funding agency Pharmac's pharmaceutical funding manager Claire Pouwels confirmed that the agency had "a significant safety buffer" of vaccines. During Measles Immunisation Week (3–9 November), Health New Zealand managed to administer a total of 15,318 MMR doses.

On 10 December, Tongan New Zealander and Auckland University of Technology immunologist Chris Puli'uvea urged Pasifika New Zealanders traveling to their home countries in the Pacific or within New Zealand to check they were immunised against measles to combat the spread of the disease.

On 4 February 2026, Health New Zealand declared that the 2025 measles outbreak had ended, after 42 days had passed since the last confirmed case on 21 December 2025.
