= Jeanette Wilson =

New Zealand writer and psychic medium

- Born: 1962 or 1963 (age 62–63); United Kingdom
- Occupations: Medium, reiki practitioner, dietary supplement promoter
- Years active: 1995–present
- Known for: Spiritual healing, unsubstantiated health advice, conspiracy theories
- Partner: Andrew Carter
- Children: 2

Jeanette Wilson (born 1962 or 1963) is a New Zealand medium, reiki practitioner, and spiritual healer. She says she is able to heal people with the assistance of spirits. She has been criticised for promoting anti-vaccination views, unproven supplements, anti-5G claims, and dangerous COVID-19 health advice.

== Early life and family ==
Wilson was born in the United Kingdom. She worked as a Lloyds Bank manager in the UK until she began working as a psychic healer, reiki healer, and medium. She says her grandfather was the first dead person to contact her. She moved from the UK to New Zealand in 1999. Her partner is Andrew Carter and they live in Orewa in Auckland.

== Mediumship and psychic healing ==
Wilson has said that she is able to communicate with spirits who help her to conduct spiritual healing. She has stated that her psychic healing abilities include curing arthritis and the healing of vision impairments that require glasses. She has also stated that she has treated paralysis, blindness in one eye, and many cases of life-threatening cancer. Wilson has said she never discourages her clients from seeking medical care. When asked whether curing people of medical conditions was accurate, Wilson replied that she doesn't use the word "cure" and wondered why medical professionals don't want to learn more about what she is doing. At a show in Chester England, Wilson said that a dead surgeon named Augusto de Almeida was "working through her", and she was quoted as saying: "I wear white so that any energies taken off the patient, the recipients of the healing, don't contaminate my energy fields."

She has referred a client to João Teixeira de Faria and her meditation techniques taught in workshops are from the 'Casa in Brazil'. She has described her claimed psychic abilities in the context of her Christianity, stating that they are a gift from God. She has stated that her psychic sessions always include the Lord's Prayer and the Hail Mary.

== Media coverage and public events ==
In 2004, Wilson was the subject of a New Zealand TV Channel Three series titled Dare to Believe. Later, she was featured on an episode of 20/20. She has written four books about her experiences as a professional medium and about other new age topics: Backstage with Jeanette Wilson, Medium Rare, Rare Moments and Dare to Believe: Explore Your Own Psychic Abilities.

Vicki Hyde, science writer and former chair of the New Zealand Skeptics, highlights a lack of skeptical balance in media portrayals of Wilson and other self-described psychics. She remarked, "People want to hear about dead people; they don’t want to hear about a pragmatic, practical explanation that’s not half as exciting." Hyde had appeared alongside of Wilson in a television production that investigated psychic claims. Hyde expressed concern that the production and editing process resulted in her perspective being diminished in comparison to Wilson's.

Wilson has held public events in the UK and in New Zealand, as well as weekend workshops and psychic surgery sessions. She also conducts private consultations.

In February 2022, while participating in the Wellington protest, outside the New Zealand Parliament, Wilson said a police officer grabbed her and applied pressure to her windpipe, blocking her airway, and then her sternum, eventually breaking it. The police refused to render aid.

== Anti-science claims ==
Wilson has spread anti-vaccine messages, claims that 5G technology is harmful, and has said that good and bad spirits can influence people, potentially leading to drug and gambling addiction.

The Good Thinking Society's project director, Michael Marshall, has expressed concerns that Wilson's shows may discourage people from seeking medical help while "wasting their money," and that her anti-vaccine rhetoric may endanger children. Several venues in the UK cancelled appearances by Wilson after Marshall contacted them about these concerns. The NZ Skeptics made a similar effort to urge venues to cancel Wilson's events during her tour of New Zealand. The chair of the organisation, Craig Shearer, voiced concerns about the risk of participants forgoing medical care and suffering financial exploitation. After Marshall contacted the UK Advertising Standards Authority, Wilson said she was cautioned to comply with UK regulations and was told to remove claims of working with spirit world doctors, any of her videos that mentioned diseases, and that she was only allowed to say she could "give people feeling of well being".

In June 2020, The Spinoff reported that in an online workshop May 28, attended by investigator Susan Gerbic who recorded the event and notified the publication, Wilson made unsubstantiated claims including:

- A scientifically unproven dietary supplement, HFI, described as a "soil-based, broad spectrum anti-viral supplement", would prevent COVID-19.
- The use of ventilators for COVID-19 treatment was misguided, and that patients "needed antibiotics" instead.
- The coronavirus was man-made but was accidentally released.
- The coronavirus is going to "miraculously disappear" by the end of 2020 due to mutations.

Wilson also said that God created a body with an immune system so she was not a believer in vaccines. Elsewhere in the video, Wilson defends Donald Trump, saying "He's seen through [infectious diseases expert and coronavirus taskforce member] Anthony Fauci, he's sorted out the World Health Organization, he's stopping the 5G, he's stopping mandatory vaccines, all the key things that need to happen, he's onto it a lot more than most people realise."

== Dietary supplements ==
In July 2020, RNZ reported that Wilson was claiming that a bluetooth device called the Healy Resonance she sells for the starting price of $780 can dose vitamins "vibrationally." In a sales-pitch, Wilson says "This is the best investment you'll probably make your whole life, for what it can do for you and your family". The Consumer NZ head of research said Wilson's claims were "a load of nonsense and unfortunately these kinds of claims are rife and enforcement is lacking which means shonky traders are making advantage of the situation". Physics professor Richard Easther of the University of Auckland says that claims being made about the product are not valid, and that he "wouldn't touch this with a barge pole." A Medsafe spokesman said Healy was being sold by Wilson as a medical device, therefore its promotion via testimonial was not permitted. The statement went on to warn that consumers with serious health conditions should speak to a healthcare professional before buying a device like the Healy.

At her shows, Wilson advertises a dietary supplement, called alfa PXP Royale, made from micronised black rice. The supplement is sold by Enzacta, a multi-level marketing company for which Wilson is a promoter, at a dramatic markup relative to the cost of whole purple rice sold in supermarkets or "micronised purple rice" sold online. The Spinoff reported that Wilson promotes PXP Royale as "the most amazing product on the face of the Earth", and sells jars containing 30 servings at NZD$148 each. Wilson has claimed of PXP, that it could be used preventatively or when someone starts having symptoms. She also suggested, against all evidence, that "the people most at risk [from COVID-19] are obviously the younger people, as in babies and children that haven't got such a robust immune system". A surgeon interviewed by Australia's A Current Affair television show criticised the marketing of the supplement, stating that customers are "wasting their money"...[and]..."they may be led to believe they don't need to take their effective treatments for conditions they may actually have." Despite this, Wilson claims that the "purple powder" can help elderly people "keep their vibrations up".

== Political career ==
On 11 August 2020 Wilson announced she would run for parliament against Prime Minister Jacinda Ardern in the Mount Albert electorate as a candidate of the Public Party in the 2020 New Zealand general election. The Public Party had joined forces (26 July 2020) with Jami-Lee Ross's Advance NZ party, and has labelled COVID-19 a "plandemic". Wilson said "If I'm putting my hat in the ring and going into politics, I'm going to do it with absolute truth and absolute integrity."

In her announcement, Wilson accused Jacinda Ardern of treason, and revealed evidence she said could bring the election to a halt. She questioned the lawfulness of the government, saying "I have found something that is going to challenge our very constitution here, whether our government has the right to make the laws – such as the Covid." Constitutional lawyer Andrew Geddis, when asked for his opinion on Wilson's legal pronouncements, described them as incoherent and lacking legal substance. He noted that they piece together various events and documents in a way that may superficially resemble a legal argument but ultimately amount to nonsense. He also pointed out that similar types of claims have been raised before. Twenty-two hours later Wilson changed her mind and withdrew, saying, "I am guided what to do, we all are, the question is whether we listen ... This morning I was guided to withdraw from being a candidate in the forthcoming election."

In the 2023 New Zealand general election Wilson was planning to stand for New Zealand Loyal (NZL) in the Whangaparoa electorate, but NZL failed to properly register her and other candidates.

== Selected publications ==
- — (2004). Medium Rare (3rd ed.). Zenith Publishing. ISBN 1877365017.
- — (2005). Rare Moments. Zenith Publishing. ISBN 1877365122.
- — (2006). Dare to Believe: Explore Your Own Psychic Abilities. New Zealand: Random House New Zealand. ISBN 1869417682.
- — (2007). Backstage with Jeanette Wilson. Australia: Random House. ISBN 978-1869418939.

== See also ==
- Energy (healing or psychic or spiritual)
- Taylor Winterstein (fellow PXP promoter)
