= Measles resurgence in the Americas =

In November 2025, Canada lost its Measles Elimination Status after the virus had circulated for at least 12 months. As a consequence, the Americas, the only measles free WHO region, also lost its measles elimination status.

In 2026, Bolivia, Mexico and the United States lost measles elimination status.

== History ==
In 2016, the Americas were declared measles free.

In 2018, Venezuela lost its measles elimination status.

In 2019, Brazil lost its measles elimination status.

In 2024, the region regained its measles elimination status.

"As of 7 November 2025, 12,596 confirmed measles cases have been reported across ten countries (approximately 95% of the Region's cases in Canada, Mexico and US), a 30-fold increase compared to 2024."

== Canada ==
In 1998, Canada was declared measles free.

Canada experienced an outbreak of measles beginning in October 2024. By 2025, the virus had spread to every province except Newfoundland and Labrador as well as to the Northwest Territories, with cases concentrated in Alberta and Ontario. By the end of the outbreak in October 2026, over 6,400 cases had been recorded across Canada.

== See also ==
- Measles resurgence in Europe
