= 2025 Belize measles outbreak =

Disease outbreak in Belize

- Disease: Measles
- Pathogen: Not reported
- Source: Chihuahua, Mexico
- Location: Belize (Corozal, Cayo)
- First reported: 13 April 2025
- Index case: 12 April 2025
- Arrival date: 31 March 2025
- Type: Disease outbreak
- Confirmed cases: 7
- Suspected cases: Not reported
- Deaths: 0
- Vaccinations: MMR vaccine

On 12 April 2025, two cases of measles linked to international travel were confirmed in the Cayo and Corozal districts of Belize. By 28 April, a further five cases were confirmed among close contacts of these initial cases. On 12 May, health authorities declared local transmission of measles in Spanish Lookout, Cayo. As of 13 May, the outbreak is confirmed to have infected seven persons and suspected to have infected at least a few more. No deaths have been reported. This outbreak is the first such in the country since the eradication of measles in 1991.

== Background ==
Belize was deemed measles-free in 1991, and reported no positive cases in the ensuing decades (until the present outbreak) despite not meeting the World Health Organization target vaccination range for measles (92–95 percent). (Note: Press Office 2025a, para 1, World Health Organization 2025, sec 2. In 2024, only 83.9 percent of the population had received the second dose of the MMR vaccine (World Health Organization 2025, sec 2). In particular, Cayo reported the lowest coverage for the same at 73.5 percent in 2024 (Amandala 2025, para 4).)

== Epidemiology ==
On 12 April, the Ministry of Health & Wellness confirmed two positive measles cases in two 17-year-old males from Corozal and Cayo with no vaccination history. (Note: World Health Organization 2025, sec 2. Or a 17 year old male and female (The San Pedro Sun 2025, paras 1, 3, Amandala 2025, para 1).) They reported having travelled to Chihuahua, Mexico from 5 January to 31 March for a religious gathering, and having subsequently developed symptoms on 2–3 April. (Note: World Health Organization 2025, sec 2. The trip to Chihuahua was undertaken by 15 persons (including the two patients) from four Belizean towns or villages, all of whom were quarantined (The San Pedro Sun 2025, para 3, Amandala 2025, para 1).) By 28 April, an additional five positive cases were confirmed among close contacts of the two aforementioned patients.

On 12 May, the Ministry reported they were monitoring a number of suspected cases in Spanish Lookout, Cayo, likewise linked to recent travel to Chihuahua, and further cautioned the public of 'ongoing measles transmission' in the said Mennonite village. (Note: Press Office 2025c, paras 3-4, 7News 2025, paras 1-5, LoveFM 2025, paras 1-2. The Ministry was alerted of a possible measles case in said village on 9 May (7News 2025, para 4).)

== Response ==
The Ministry of Health & Wellness reported the positive measles cases on 13 April, noting they would increase surveillance efforts and vaccine access in response, and encouraging unvaccinated persons to receive both doses of the MMR vaccine at their nearest health facility. Op-ed writer Omar Silva noted that the outbreak 'jolted the nation,' and further criticised the Ministry's delayed reporting, low vaccine stockpiles, and weak surveillance at ports of entry.

== See also ==
- 2025 Southwest United States measles outbreak – including outbreak in Chihuahua, Mexico

== Notes and references ==
=== Bibliography ===
1. "New Measles Outbreak In Spanish Lookout". 7News. 13 May 2025. Archived from the original on 20 May 2025.
2. "Belize Records First Measles Cases in 34 Years". Amandala. 20 April 2025. Archived from the original on 20 May 2025.
3. "Health Ministry Urges Vaccination After New Measles Case Confirmed". LoveFM. 13 May 2025. Archived from the original on 14 May 2025.
4. "Ministry of Health & Wellness Confirms Two Measles Cases in Belize". Press Office. 13 April 2025. Archived from the original on 20 May 2025.
5. "Ministry of Health and Wellness Provides Update on Measles Outbreak". Press Office. 28 April 2025. Archived from the original on 20 May 2025.
6. "Measles Outbreak in Belize – Public Health Update". Press Office. 12 May 2025. Archived from the original on 20 May 2025.
7. Silva O (15 April 2025). "Belize's Measles Comeback: A Warning Ignored, A Nation at Risk". National Perspective Belize. Archived from the original on 20 May 2025.
8. "Measles Cases Reported in Belize, MOHW Encourages Vaccination". The San Pedro Sun. 18 April 2025. Archived from the original on 20 May 2025.
9. "Disease Outbreak News; Measles in the Region of the Americas". World Health Organization. 28 April 2025. Archived from the original on 20 May 2025.
