= Measles resurgence in Europe =

Increase in measles cases in Europe between 2017 and 2025

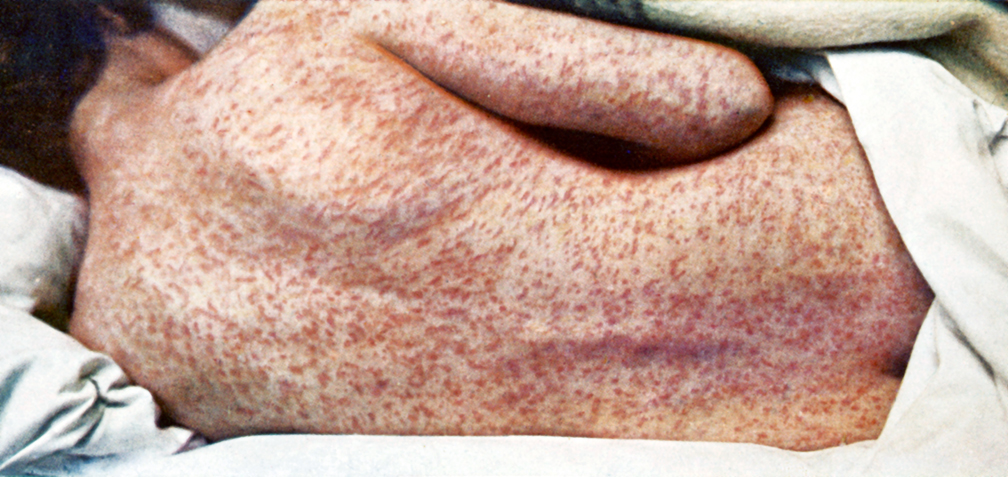
The back of a female with measles

In 2016, measles cases in Europe dropped to a record low of 4,400 cases due to the successful and widespread use of the measles vaccine in the vaccine schedules of the various countries of the region. However, since 2017 measles cases and deaths from the disease have risen significantly due to a combination of war, vaccine hesitancy and anti-vaccine activism which have disrupted vaccination rates. By 2026, six European countries had lost their WHO measles elimination status.

== Increase in measles cases from 2017 to 2019 ==
Despite a record low case count of 4,400 in Europe in 2016, the Russo-Ukrainian war interfered with measles vaccination rates in Ukraine, where only 42% of infants were able to be vaccinated for that year. As a result, cases of measles soared to 54,000 being reported in that country in 2018. This represented 65% of the measles cases across Europe, where countries such as Greece saw a doubling in the incidence of measles and France recorded a six-fold increase.

In 2019, cases in Ukraine had a further increase to 57,000.

== Increase in measles cases from 2022 ==
In 2020 and 2021, the COVID-19 pandemic and resultant implementation of worldwide quarantine and control measures saw a massive drop in cases. This period also saw an increase in measles vaccination rates in Ukraine to 80%. However, the Russian invasion of Ukraine in 2022 again significantly disrupted vaccination schedules in Ukraine.

Combined with the pandemic causing a decrease in vaccination rates in other countries across Europe, as well as a rise in vaccine hesitancy and the spread of anti-vaccine disinformation, 2024 saw a significant increase in measles cases in Europe with 127,350 being reported. This was the highest caseload in the region since 1997, representing a third of global measles cases.

The major centre of the resurgent outbreak appeared to have spread from Ukraine to the neighbouring country of Romania where 30,692 cases were reported in 2024, as well as to Kazakhstan which had 28,147 documented cases. Low vaccination rates were also reported in Bosnia-Herzegovina and North Macedonia.

In the EU, the highest numbers of measles infections have been recorded in Romania, Italy, Belgium, France, Germany, Austria, and Spain. In England, 2,300 laboratory confirmed cases have been reported from January 2024 until October 2024, about half of them in London.

In January 2026, six European countries lost their WHO measles elimination status: Armenia, Austria, Azerbaijan, Spain, the United Kingdom, and Uzbekistan. In 2026, there was a large measles outbreak in London.

== See also ==
- Measles resurgence in the Americas
  - Measles resurgence in the United States
