= 2019 Tonga measles outbreak =

Measles epidemic in Tonga in late 2019

- Disease: Measles
- Pathogen: D8 strain (genotype) of measles virus
- Index case: October, 2019
- Dates: 22 October 2019 – present
- Confirmed cases: 612
- Deaths: 0

Government website
- https://reliefweb.int/report/tonga/tonga-measles-outbreak-2019-situation-report-8

The 2019 Tonga measles outbreak began in October 2019 after a squad of Tongan rugby players came back from New Zealand. By 5 January 2020, there had been at least 612 cases of measles.

== Background ==
A hypothetical measles timeline exposure to illness

Beginning in 2017, the WHO began tracking measles outbreaks in the Asia Pacific Region. Measles has been spreading throughout the Pacific region, with outbreaks in Tonga, Fiji, Australia, Cambodia, Japan, the Republic of Korea, Malaysia, Thailand, Vietnam, Samoa, the Philippines and New Zealand. Previously, measles had been believed to be eradicated in the Asia Pacific Region, with the last reported case in 2014, prior to the outbreak.

Samoa, Tonga and Fiji all declared states of emergency to tackle their 2019 measles outbreaks. When contrasting the scores of deaths in Samoa to the lack of fatalities in Tonga and Fiji, this is put down to the far higher vaccination rates in Tonga and Fiji compared to the 31% in Samoa.

Most of the cases have been on the island of Tongatapu where the first cases started, with 88% of all cases located on Tongatapu and 10% located on the neighboring island of Vava'u.

== Vaccine hesitancy ==
The outbreak has been attributed to a sharp drop in measles vaccination in Samoa from the previous year, following an incident in 2018 when two infants died in Samoa shortly after receiving measles vaccinations, which led the country to suspend its measles vaccination program. The reason for the two infants' deaths was incorrect preparation of the vaccine by two nurses who mixed vaccine powder with expired anaesthetic. The nurses responsible were sentenced to 5 years in prison with manslaughter charges and Samoa began arresting anti-vaccination advocates. The United States' Centers for Disease Control sent representatives to Samoa, Tonga, and Fiji to coordinate vaccine efforts and combate vaccine misinformation.

== Government response ==
Ministry of Health chief executive, Siale ‘Akau’ola, said more than 12,000 people had been re-vaccinated. This vaccination program targeted school children and 6-to 11-month-old infants. A second vaccination program was conducted in February 2020, targeting children aged 1–9 years old. The vaccination rate in Tonga was over 90% which might stem the infection rates seen in Samoa and New Zealand. In November, 2019, the Tongan Minister of Education shut down all primary schools until the beginning of 2020.

== International response ==
UNICEF sent almost 300,000 vaccines to Vanuatu, Cook Islands, Nauru, Niue, Tokelau and Tuvalu, Samoa, Tonga, and Fiji. Samoa, Tonga, and Fiji have also declared states of emergency. The WHO and UNICEF have developed a toolkit for Pacific island nations following the outbreak to aid in further measles prevention. Tonga closed all schools for several days while American Samoa required all travelers from Tonga and Samoa to present proof of vaccination. The United States' Center for Disease control placed a Level 1 travel ban to the Kingdom of Tonga following the outbreak.

Since 1 October, UNICEF delivered 12,000 measles vaccines to Tonga. UNICEF later provided 6,000 additional doses of the vaccine cold chain following the success of the first administration. Through domestic and internationally coordinated efforts, 44,605 individuals under the age of 24 were vaccinated by January 2020. This included administration of supplementary vaccines for previously vaccinated individuals in conjunction with routine childhood vaccination.

On 10 December, American Samoa declared a measle outbreak and closed public schools and park gatherings and suspended all entry permits for those travelling through Samoa and Tonga to American Samoa.

== See also ==
- Taylor Winterstein, Samoan Anti-vaxxer
- 2019 Samoa measles outbreak
- 2019 New Zealand measles outbreak
- 2019 Philippines measles outbreak
- Chemophobia
- Measles resurgence in the United States
- Vaccination
- Vaccine hesitancy
