= Taylor Winterstein =

Samoan-Australian anti-vaccine activist

- Born: Taylor Moors; 1989 (age 36–37); Australia
- Occupations: Instagram influencer, alternative "health warrior" and merchant of overpriced food products
- Years active: 2017–present
- Known for: Anti-vaxxer and wife of ex-NRL player
- Spouse: Frank Winterstein
- Children: Three

Taylor Winterstein is an Australian-Samoan online wellness influencer and conspiracy theorist best known for her public anti-vaccination stance and alternative health practices. She gained public attention for her advocacy against mandatory vaccinations, particularly during the 2019 Samoan measles outbreak, which led to widespread criticism from medical professionals and public health authorities.

Winterstein has been active on social media, where she shares content related to natural health, parenting, and holistic wellness. She has also organized workshops and events promoting vaccine skepticism, which have sparked controversy due to concerns over public health misinformation. Despite criticism, she continues to advocate for parental choice in medical decisions and alternative health approaches.

Her views on vaccination have been widely challenged by health experts and government officials, who emphasize the importance of immunization in preventing infectious diseases.

== Personal life ==
Winterstein was born in Australia, and her hometown is Campbelltown, a suburb of Sydney, Australia. She married Australian rugby league player Frank Winterstein in 2013. As of 2024 couple have three children and in late 2019 the family moved to Toulouse, France for two years.

Her relationship with her husband, who previously played in the NRL, has allowed her to gain a substantial following as a social media influencer. She has said that there is a "strong core group" of anti-vaxxers in the NRL, but during the 2020 NRL season the Gold Coast Bulletin reported this was not the case as "most of the anti-vax players said they weren't really anti-vax but were still getting around to it".

== Online influencer ==
Winterstein brands her website and internet influence business as the "Tay's Way Movement". As of December 2019, she had over 22,000 Instagram followers. Winterstein claims: "I know for a FACT there are MANY high profile, 'influencers' on social media among the sport and wellness industry, who do not vaccinate their children but won't publicly share their beliefs."

Online, Winterstein offers opinions on nutrition, medicine, home births, and the alleged dangers of 5G radiation and of vaccinating children. In one of her online programs ("An Hour of Power with Tay"), she asks her followers to "explore different options on how to build your child's immune system naturally". In March 2019, Instagram placed restrictions on her account and her social media accounts were restricted by Facebook in a crackdown to prevent dangerous and misinformed anti-vaccination messages. Winterstein's online group of followers have a history of online abuse toward journalists who report unfavourably on her.

In 2019, The Australian newspaper suggested that Winterstein is getting traction with her health messages "because she's a WAG - the wife of an NRL player". Her current business 'Tay's Way Moment' was established in 2017, before this Winterstein operated a business called 'Taylor'd Tans'.

== Anti-vaccination activism ==
Winterstein says that the "mainstream media constantly slander, dehumanise and degrade" people "who choose not to vaccinate" such as her. Despite having no degree or qualifications, she claims she has done her "own research on vaccines" on the Internet, and that she had "vaccinated" her son "at least six times a day with breastmilk". Winterstein says that vaccinations cause allergies, and to calls herself an "ex-vaxxer." She said in 2019 she had not vaccinated her boys, then aged 10-months and 3-years.

In 2018, Winterstein was selected as the "Australian face" and ambassador of the second tour of the anti-vaccination film Vaxxed. British anti-vaccination campaigner Polly Tommey, one of the producers of the film, announced Winterstein and her twin sister Stevie Nupier would be the "glamorous, young, intelligent women to take on and lead the people of Australia". Winterstein said: "I've dedicated years into my own vaccine research, meeting with politicians, connecting with practitioners and listening to parents".

Winterstein urges parents to question the safety of childhood vaccinations and says parents are being bullied and pressured by GPs to give their children vaccinations. She says she is a "big believer that you do not need a qualification to know how to critically think for yourself".

Melbourne surgeon John Cunningham, who was awarded an Order of Australia for his work promoting vaccinations, said Winterstein represented the "sinister version of the modern mumtrepreneur". He said her efforts to hitch onto the anti-vaccination crowd were morally corrupt. Brad McKay, a Sydney GP, accuses her of propagating rumours and anti-science information.

Royal Australian College of General Practitioners president Harry Nespolon suggested asking parents who they should turn to for health advice: "I would be asking people, who would they trust more with their child, their local doctor or a WAG". He also welcomed Twitter's plans to limit the impacts of misleading health information such as that disseminated by Winterstein. The treatments Winterstein recommends for curing measles showed an "utter absence of understanding of virology, pharmacology and biochemistry" according to UQ virologist Ian Mackay.

During the 2020 COVID-19 pandemic Winterstein said the outbreak was a "planned scam", adding that the government was using the outbreak as a pretext to force vaccinations on adults, saying "they're already socially programming us to accept mass vaccination for when the time comes". She has also posted that receiving the flu vaccine increases the risk of contracting coronavirus by 36 per cent, a statement that has been proven to be false.

=== Involvement in 2019 measles epidemic in Samoa ===
Samoan health officials and the World Health Organization (WHO) blame unqualified figures such as Winterstein and the anti-vaccination movement for a decline in immunisation rates, which in turn caused the 2019 measles epidemic to be more severe and deadly. Winterstein blamed the Samoan government for the epidemic as she claims it did not distribute Vitamin A tablets to those who contracted the illness.

At the time Samoa had one of the lowest vaccination rates in the world. During the vaccination crisis in June 2019, just months before the measles outbreak, Winterstein met with fellow anti-vaxxer Robert Kennedy Jr. in Samoa. Winterstein hails Kennedy as a hero, and of him has said: "I am deeply honoured to have been in the presence of a man I believe is, can and will change the course of history". US vaccine specialist and paediatrician Peter Hotez criticised the anti-vax movement targeting the small country saying: "We're going to see them continue this predatory behaviour, identifying communities, Island nations even whole countries in order to drive down vaccination coverage, so it's a very serious threat now to global public health."

Nikki Turner, director of the Immunisation Advisory Centre at the University of Auckland accused the anti-vaccine movement of ramping up their activity in Samoa when the vaccination rates had dropped, particularly on social media. She said: "Anti-vaxxers arrive in big numbers when there's concerns and lack of trust and the core of the problem that is happening in Samoa is lack of trust, lack of trust in vaccines in health service delivery."

Australian Medical Association New South Wales president Kean-Seng Lim criticised Winterstein's planned anti-vax workshop tour to Samoa saying: "To go to a third world country, to spread this in third world countries, is just irresponsible". "When you have a country which is full of small villages, it's actually hard to get out there and vaccinate people, and if you have someone who is making it even harder still, that makes it harder", he said.

Samoan Ministry of Health Director-General Take Naseri described Winterstein's planned anti-vaccination seminar "Making Informed Choices" in Apia as a "public health threat". It was cancelled after the government backlash, but she continued to campaign online. Winterstein claimed she was not encouraging non-vaccination, but rather, "informed consent, freedom of choice and vaccine injury awareness".

Medical experts warned that the deadly measles outbreak in Samoa is a sign of the expansion of an increasingly predatory anti-vaccination movement.

A measles outbreak was declared on 16 October and led to the Samoan government declaring a state of emergency on 15 November 2019 and to the introduction of an emergency mandatory vaccination strategy. Under the emergency measures children and adults were obliged to vaccinate, while kindergartens, schools and the university were closed, and unvaccinated pregnant women were barred from attending work. With assistance from overseas, the government began a mass vaccination campaign. To assist in the mass vaccination measures, Samoa's prime minister decreed that citizens "tie a red cloth or red flag in front of their houses and near the road to indicate that family members have not been vaccinated".

After the outbreak, the anti-vax activists doubled-down on social media, and the Samoan government met resistance from anti-vaxxers to its emergency strategy, notably from Winterstein. Helen Petousis-Harris, a vaccinologist at the University of Auckland, condemned those anti-vaxxers involved saying: "In a sense it's a pro-death movement", adding that "We've got children dying and people are actively trying to stop people becoming vaccinated, and that vaccination is what's going to prevent more deaths."

Winterstein likened the emergency mandatory vaccination strategy introduced after the outbreak to Nazi Germany, saying Samoa is "in violation of the Nuremberg Code" by enforcing mandatory immunisation, and posted a #NaziSamoa hashtag on social media. On social media she also said: "Facism [sic] is well and truly alive in Samoa", also noting "ambulances doing drive-bys to find children who are unvaccinated". Winterstein claimed Samoan children infected with measles were making a full recovery after using "simple and effective protocols" adding that "the media are still trying to rubbish and debunk". She was critical of the current medical treatment of antibiotics and acetaminophen being given, recommending vitamin A tablets for those with measles instead. Immunologist Nikki Turner said vitamin A could be used as part of treatment, but it is no cure.

The Samoan Government ordered anti-vaccination advocates such as Winterstein to stop discouraging people from seeking vaccination, with the Prime Minister Tuilaepa Sailele Malielegaoi suggesting imprisonment for anti-vaccination advocates. Samoa's Attorney-General Lemalu Hermann Retzlaff also warned against discouraging the vaccinations. He said "Samoan Law enforcement is open to receiving notice, complaints, or evidence of any person... discouraging or going as far as preventing our community from vaccination".

On 6 December, Samoan anti-vaxxer, Edwin Tamasese, was charged with "incitement against a government order". Winterstein supports the traditional healer as a "true hero" calling him the "hero on the ground".

As of late December, there were 83 deaths and 5,700 confirmed cases of measles out of a Samoan population of 201,000. Almost three per cent of the population had been infected. The majority of those who had died were children under the age of five and infants.

== Workshops and life-coaching programs ==
Winterstein is a self-proclaimed "Integrative Nutrition Health Coach", and runs workshops such as "Making Informed Choices" which costs A$200 per person. She promotes scepticism about vaccinating children while raising fears about so-called "vaccine injuries". In an attempt to counter the Australian state and federal no-jab, no-play laws, the workshops also canvass anti-vaxxer parents' options for daycare and preschool. Winterstein has been critical of those who say they cannot afford the workshop entry fee, suggesting to followers; "if a money block is coming up for you, I invite you to explore that a little deeper and reflect on those limiting beliefs."

Winterstein also presented at the 2019 Canberra Vaccination Conference, an anti-vaccination event, alongside other renowned anti-vaxxers such as Judy Wilyman and Michael O'Neill from Informed Medical Options Party (IMOP), an Australian anti-vax/anti-fluoridation political party.

In 2019, Winterstein had planned tours of Samoa, New Zealand and Australia, but the Samoan and New Zealand legs of the tour were cancelled with Winterstein blaming "organised groups ... working hard to sabotage" her. An online petition was organised to stop Winterstein's tour of New Zealand.

== Alfa PXP Royale ==
Winterstein used her website to sell Alfa PXP Royale (PXP), ground-up purple rice grown in Thailand. The website for the company that produces PXP, Enzacta, claims several health benefits for their product, including that it can help with pain, migraines, autism, improve eyesight and wrinkles. Other unsubstantiated medical claims have been made regarding PXP, including that it neutralises free radicals, incorrectly claimed to be the root of cancer, heart disease, Alzheimer's, stroke and diabetes. Melbourne surgeon John Cunningham said PXP was essentially ground-up rice that might as well come from a kitchen pantry, saying: "I don't think giving people like that false hope and making money from it is acceptable."

Winterstein sold PXP for up to $1000 a kilogram, whereas purple rice, which is the same as black rice, can be purchased from supermarkets for around $10 a kilogram. Customers could get a discount on PXP if they signed up to sell the product, also giving them the prospect of bonuses and luxury rewards. Enzacta, the company behind PXP, lists its office as a postbox in Wyoming, US which is also a depot for hundreds of other businesses. An Enzacta salesperson in New Zealand stated it was a multi-level marketing company.

In March 2019, Winterstein announced that she was no longer selling PXP to focus on her workshops. Following a report on Winterstein by the Australian television program A Current Affair, the product was removed from sale from her website.

== See also ==
- 2019 Tonga measles outbreak
- Measles resurgence in the United States
- Vaccination
- Jeanette Wilson (also PXP promoter)
- 2019 in Oceania
