= Frank Winterstein =

Australian international rugby league footballer

Frankie Winterstein
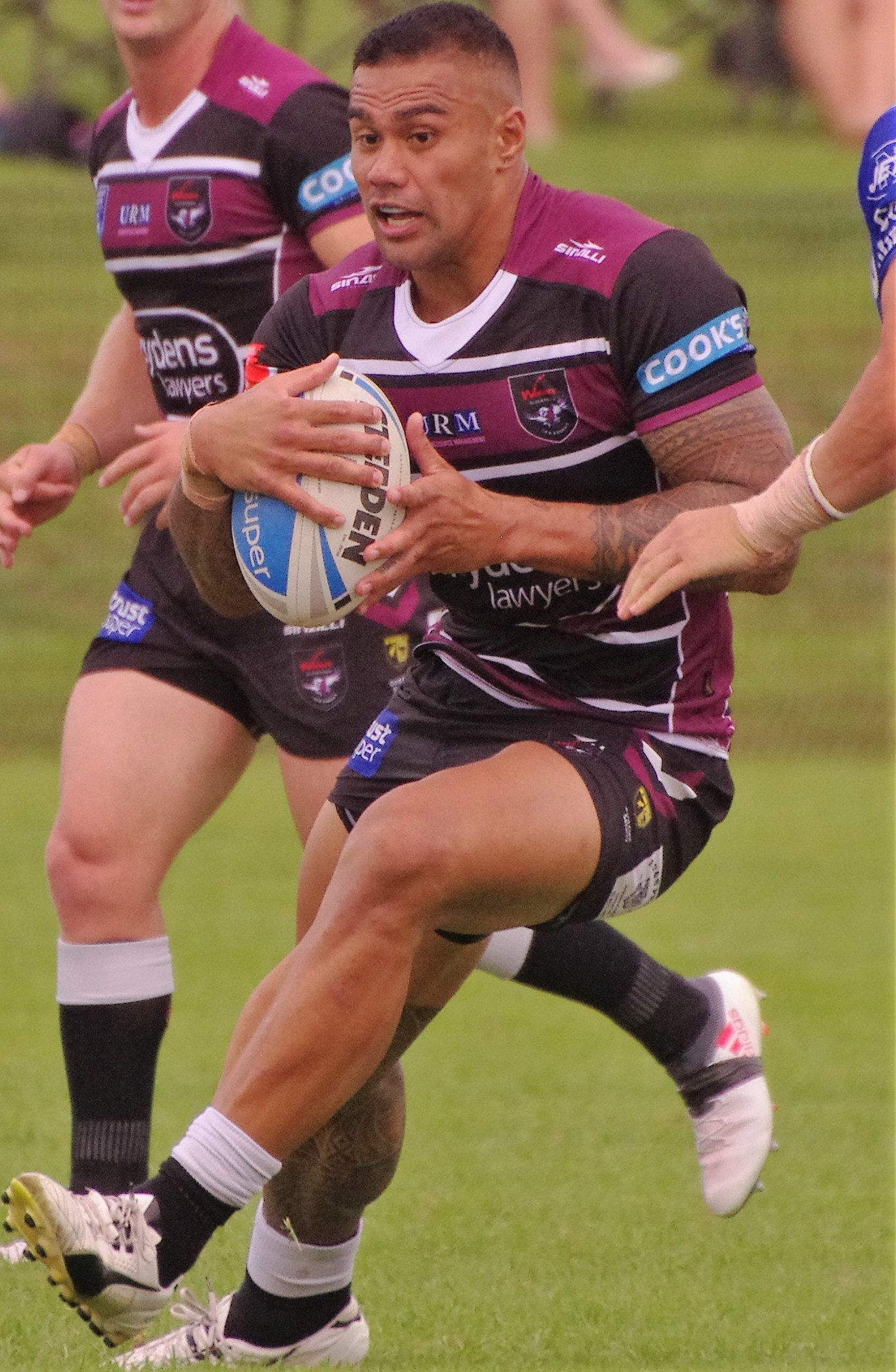

Personal information
- Full name: Frank Winterstein
- Born: 17 December 1986 (age 39) Canterbury, New South Wales, Australia
- Height: 1.94 m (6 ft 4 in)
- Weight: 105 kg (16 st 7 lb; 231 lb)

Playing information

Rugby league
- Position: Second-row
Club
Years	Team	Pld	T	G	FG	P
2008	Canterbury Bulldogs	5	0	0	0	0
2009	Wakefield Trinity Wildcats	6	0	0	0	0
2010–11	Crusaders RL	48	5	0	0	20
2012–13	Widnes Vikings	50	15	0	0	60
2016–18	Manly Sea Eagles	42	3	0	0	12
2019	Penrith Panthers	12	1	0	0	4
2020–21	Toulouse Olympique	4	0	0	0	0
	Total	167	24	0	0	96
Representative
Years	Team	Pld	T	G	FG	P
2006–17	Samoa	9	2	0	0	8

Rugby union
- Position: Centre
Club
Years	Team	Pld	T	G	FG	P
2014–15	Kintetsu Liners	19	0	0	0	0
Representative
Years	Team	Pld	T	G	FG	P
2016	Australia 7s	15	1	0	0	5
- Source: As of 23 January 2021
- Spouse: Taylor Winterstein (m. 2013)
- Children: 3
- Relatives: Antonio Winterstein (cousin)

Frank Winterstein (born 17 December 1986) is a former Samoa international rugby league footballer who most recently played as a second-row forward for Toulouse Olympique in the Championship.

Winterstein previously played for the Canterbury-Bankstown Bulldogs, Manly-Warringah Sea Eagles and the Penrith Panthers in the National Rugby League (NRL), and for the Wakefield Trinity Wildcats, Crusaders Rugby League and the Widnes Vikings in the Super League.

He played rugby union for the Kintetsu Liners in the Top League and the Australian rugby sevens team.

== Background ==
He was born in Canterbury, New South Wales, Australia.

== Playing career ==
Winterstein previously played for Wakefield Trinity and the Canterbury-Bankstown Bulldogs in the NRL. Winterstein made his first grade debut for Canterbury-Bankstown in Round 13 2008 at ANZ Stadium against the Newcastle Knights. Winterstein made five appearances in his debut season as Canterbury endured a horror season on the field finishing last on the table and claimed the wooden spoon.

Winterstein later signed a two-year deal at Super League newcomers Widnes.

=== Bradford Bulls ===
In October 2013, Winterstein signed a one-year deal with the Bradford Bulls while he was playing in the 2013 Rugby League World Cup with Samoa. He was released by mutual consent in January 2014, without having appeared for the club.

=== Rugby union ===
In March 2016, Winterstein joined the Australian rugby sevens squad. He appeared at the 2016 Hong Kong Sevens, 2016 Singapore Sevens and 2016 London Sevens.

=== Manly Warringah Sea Eagles ===
Winterstein returned to rugby league in August 2016, signing with the Manly Warringah Sea Eagles effective immediately until the end of 2017. In July 2017, Winterstein extended his contract with the Sea Eagles until the end of 2019.

=== Penrith Panthers ===
At the start of the 2019 NRL season, Winterstein was released by Manly-Warringah and he signed a contract to join Penrith. Winterstein made his debut for Penrith in round two against Newcastle, scoring a try in a 16–14 victory at the Newcastle International Sports Centre.

On 16 September 2019, it was revealed that Winterstein was one of ten players who were to be released by the Penrith club at the end of the 2019 NRL season.

=== Toulouse Olympique ===
At the end of the 2019 season, the 32-year-old was not offered another Australian contract. He then signed a two-year deal with the French rugby league team Toulouse Olympique for the European 2020/21 seasons.

On 22 Jan 2021, it was reported that he had left the club by mutual consent

=== Representative career ===
Winterstein has represented Samoa internationally, first playing in the Federation Shield in 2005.

== Personal life ==
Winterstein is the cousin of North Queensland Cowboys winger Antonio Winterstein. He is married to social media influencer Taylor Winterstein.
