= 2019 measles outbreak in the Philippines =

Disease outbreak in the Philippines

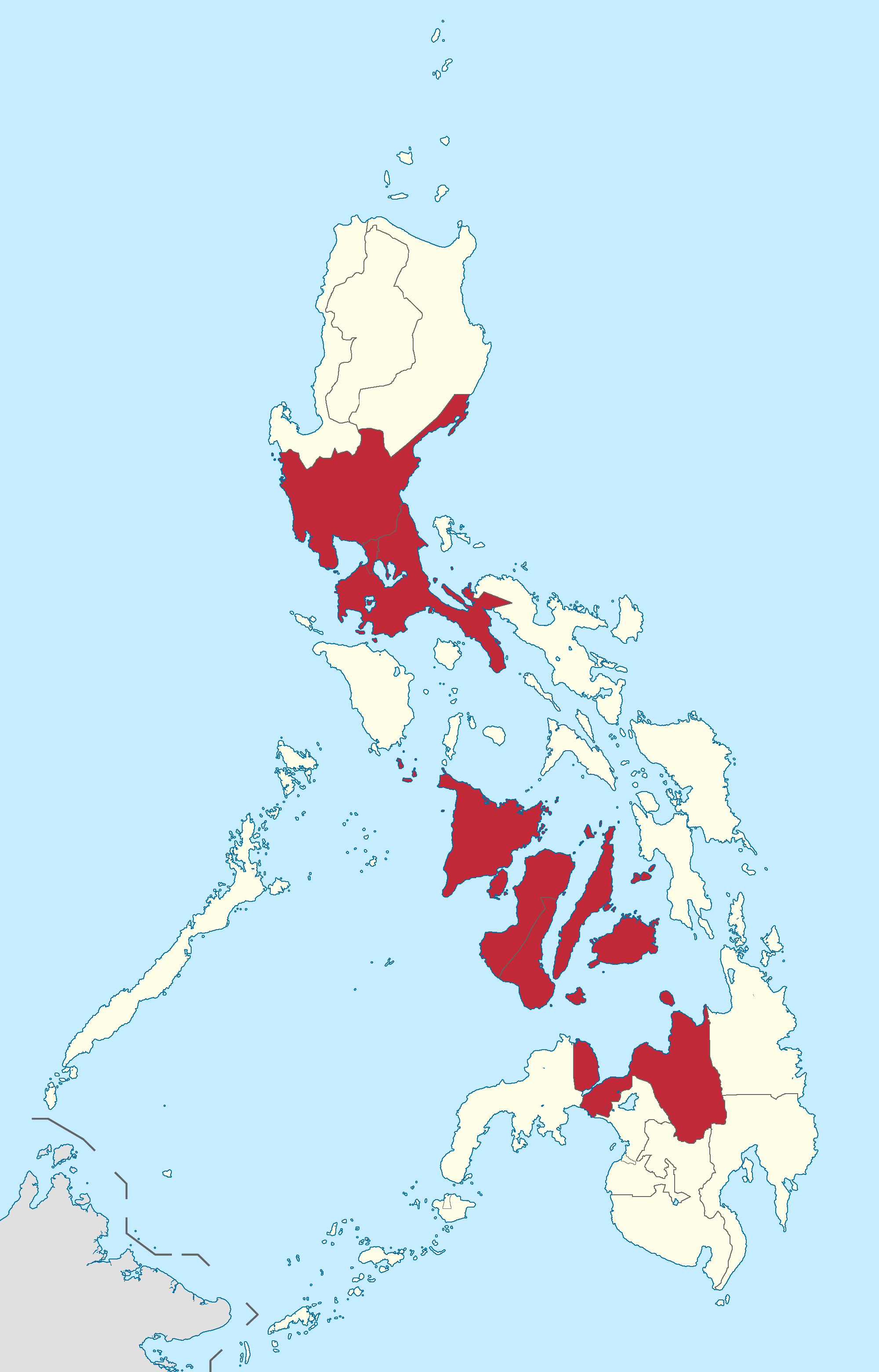
- Regions that experienced a measles outbreak in red.
- Disease: Measles
- Index case: Indeterminate, Outbreak first declared in Metro Manila
- Confirmed cases: 31,056 (April 13) (Note: Nationwide statistics by the Department of Health – Health Emergency Management Bureau. Includes figures from regions where an outbreak has not been officially declared.)
- Deaths: 415 (April 13)

The 2019 Philippines measles outbreak began in early 2019. An outbreak of measles was officially declared in February 2019 in select administrative regions in Luzon and Visayas including Metro Manila by the Philippine government. The outbreak is attributed to lower vaccination rates, from a high of 88% 10 to 15 years previous to 74% at the time of the outbreak, allegedly caused by the Dengvaxia controversy.

== Epidemiology ==
The Department of Health (DOH) of the Philippines declared a measles outbreak in Metro Manila due to a 550% increase in the number of patients from January 1 to February 6, 2019, compared to figures of the equivalent period from 2018. Outbreaks were also officially declared in Central Luzon, Calabarzon, Western Visayas, Central Visayas. and Northern Mindanao. A joint report by the United Nations Children's Fund (UNICEF) and World Health Organization has stated in the report that the outbreak started much earlier in late-2017 in Mindanao.

Metro Manila and Calabarzon being the most affected regions with at least a thousand cases each.

The DOH has recorded at 8,443 cases from January 1 to February 18, 2019, with 135 of these cases resulting to deaths. On March 1, 2019, it was reported that there are at least 13,723 cases and 215 deaths recorded nationwide.

By April 30, the DOH declared that the measles outbreak is already under control but remained hesitant in officially lifting the outbreak declaration. There are 31,056 cases and 415 deaths recorded from January 1 to April 13.

== Cases ==
In connection with the measles outbreak, the Philippine government has been maintaining a tally of confirmed cases and deaths from measles nationwide, including in regions not officially experiencing a measles outbreak.

Confirmed cases by region (26 March 2019) (Source: Department of Health – Health Emergency Management Bureau)
| Region | Confirmed cases | Confirmed deaths | Official outbreak declaration |
|---|---|---|---|
| Ilocos Region (Region I) | 1,035 | 12 | No outbreak |
| Cagayan Valley (Region II) | 349 | 2 | No outbreak |
| Central Luzon (Region III) | 3,761 | 57 | Outbreak declared |
| Calabarzon | 4,838 | 98 | Outbreak declared |
| Mimaropa | 987 | 8 | No outbreak |
| Bicol Region (Region V) | 694 | 6 | No outbreak |
| Western Visayas (Region VI) | 1,371 | 5 | Outbreak declared |
| Central Visayas (Region VII) | 1,115 | 10 | Outbreak declared |
| Eastern Visayas (Region VIII) | 1,023 | 24 | No outbreak |
| Zamboanga Peninsula (Region IX) | 302 | 1 | No outbreak |
| Northern Mindanao (Region X) | 1,159 | 10 | Outbreak declared |
| Davao Region (Region XI) | 489 | 7 | No outbreak |
| Socsksargen (Region XII) | 576 | 4 | No outbreak |
| Caraga (Region XIII) | 576 | 2 | No outbreak |
| Bangsamoro (BARMM) | 451 | 4 | No outbreak |
| Cordillera Administrative Region (CAR) | 367 | 1 | No outbreak |
| Metro Manila (National Capital Region; NCR) | 4,568 | 87 | Outbreak declared |
| Total (Nationwide) | 23,563 | 338 | Outbreak in 6 out 17 regions |

== Cause ==
Vaccination against measles is available for free in government hospitals and health centers but there is a lowered trust in vaccination in the country. According to an opinion poll conducted by the London School of Hygiene and Tropical Medicine in 2018, 32 percent of the surveyed 1,500 Filipinos trusted vaccines. In the 2015 iteration of the poll, 93 percent of the respondents said they trusted vaccines. Health Secretary Francisco Duque III attributes the lowered trust on the government's immunization drive due to the Dengvaxia controversy.

The United Nations International Children's Emergency Fund (UNICEF) said that the outbreak is caused by "failure of the health system" saying that the distribution of vaccines down to the barangay level has not worked properly. They cited that immunization rates in the country have been declining in the past 10 to 15 years with about 74% immunized at the time of the outbreak compared to a high of 88%; 10 or 15 years ago. UNICEF and the WHO has also attributed increase vaccine hesitancy in 2018 due to the Dengue vaccine controversy as a factor contributing to the outbreak. Statistical data from UNICEF, however, shows that decline in Measles vaccination began as early as 2014, four years before the Dengvaxia controversy happened.

As of March 1, 2019, 62 percent of all cases recorded at that time involved individuals who were not vaccinated against measles.

== Response ==
The Department of Health released an informercial featuring then-Senator and boxer Manny Pacquiao in order to encourage parents and guardians to get their children vaccinated against measles in response to the outbreak.

Neighbouring Malaysia's state of Sabah through the Health and People Wellbeing Ministry working towards getting all children, especially stateless people to be vaccinated following the outbreak in their neighbour the Philippines.

== See also ==
- 2019 Samoa measles outbreak
- 2019 Tonga measles outbreak
- 2019 New Zealand measles outbreak
- Measles resurgence in the United States
- Vaccination
- Vaccine hesitancy
