= 2019–2020 New Zealand measles outbreak =

Measles epidemic affecting New Zealand

- Map of confirmed measles cases in New Zealand during the 2019–2020 outbreak by district health board (DHB)
- Date: 1 August 2019 – 21 February 2020: Christchurch; 16 February – 16 May 2019: Auckland; 28 February 2019 – 7 February 2020

The 2019–2020 New Zealand measles outbreak was an epidemic that primarily affected the Auckland region. It was the largest measles outbreak in the country since the introduction of the second dose of MMR vaccine to the New Zealand National Immunisation Schedule in 1992. An outbreak in 1991 caused an estimated tens of thousands of cases, followed by another outbreak in 1997 with 2,169 reported cases.

The D8 strain was confirmed to be the main strain of the epidemic, although the B3 strain was also detected, and the epidemic has spread to several other countries. In Samoa more than 72 people have died. Cases in Tonga and Fiji have also been recorded, and an outbreak in Perth began in October 2019 after a New Zealander visited while infectious. In New Zealand, two unborn fetuses in second trimester died as a result of the outbreak.

== Response ==
The New Zealand Government was criticised for its response to the epidemic, particularly due to shortages in the supply of vaccines. Scientists also criticised the Ministry of Health for not acting on previous recommendations to conduct national 'catch-up' campaigns with the MMR vaccine prior to the outbreak.

In 2017, the New Zealand Health Ministry produced documents highlighting the urgent need to increase measles immunisation among young people, stating that a "systematic, programmatic approach" was needed to address an immunity gap. In 2018, Dr Nikki Turner, Chair of the National Measles Verification Committee, met to discuss the immunisation gap. It was noted damage was historical and immunisation rates had improved but by 2019 the gap had not been fully addressed. Many young people were unaware of their vaccination status, indicating that poor record keeping contributed to ineffective delivery. David Haymen and Turner concluded that the best way to close the immunity gap was to undertake a formal catch-up programme.

Research into the 2019 measles epidemic traced its history and showed it was young infants who were most at risk, followed by teenagers and adults under the age of 30. Analysis by the Immunisation Advisory Centre found that individuals born between 1982 and 2007 had low immunization rates, and vaccination records are incomplete for that period as the National Immunisation Register was introduced in 2005. The research also suggested management strategies such as a national campaign targeting at-risk age groups; establishment of systems to ensure adequate supplies of vaccines; provision of support for their delivery at the practice level; and creative use of community facilities to improve accessibility.

During the COVID-19 pandemic in New Zealand, it became apparent that in the drive to obtain a vaccine for that outbreak, there was a stall in getting measles vaccination programmes rolled out effectively. Dr. Nikki Turner warned that because of this disruption, it was possible that there would be "bigger problems with children dying from measles, and the damage from measles, than Covid."

Although New Zealand has had a high demand for the MMR vaccine, resulting in a shortage, there has also been an increase in the number of people who have declined the vaccine since 2017.

== Cases ==
As of 24 February 2020, there had been 2,194 cases of measles reported throughout New Zealand since 1 January 2019. Auckland had been the worst-hit region, with 1,736 cases alone. The New Zealand government activated the National Health Coordination Center in August 2019 to respond to the outbreak.

Country	Cases (conf)	Deaths	Last update
New Zealand	2,194	2*	
Australia	74	0	
Fiji	24	0	
Total	2,093 (see note 1)	2*	

Confirmed cases by District Health Board (24 February 2020)
Region	Cases	Hospitalised
Northland	133	23
Waitematā	306	129
Auckland	274	108
Counties Manukau	1,157	435
Waikato	51	12
Lakes	30	6
Bay of Plenty	45	19
Tairāwhiti	0	0
Taranaki	8	3
Hawke's Bay	26	8
Whanganui	0	0
MidCentral	10	0
Hutt Valley	9	1
Capital and Coast	24	7
Wairarapa	1	0
Nelson Marlborough	1	0
West Coast	0	0
Canterbury	44	17
South Canterbury	2	0
Southern	73	6
Total (nationwide)	2,194	774

== See also ==
- Taylor Winterstein, Samoan anti-vaccination campaigner
- 2019 Samoa measles outbreak
- 2019 Tonga measles outbreak
- 2019 Philippines measles outbreak
- 2025 New Zealand measles outbreak
- Chemophobia
- Measles resurgence in the United States
- Vaccination
- Vaccine hesitancy
