= 2019 Samoa measles outbreak =

Measles epidemic in Samoa in late 2019

- Disease: Measles
- Pathogen: D8 strain (genotype) of measles virus
- Index case: 30 September 2019
- Dates: 30 September 2019 – 22 December 2019
- Confirmed cases: 5,707
- Deaths: 83

The 2019 Samoa measles outbreak began in September 2019. By 6 January 2020, over 5,700 cases of measles and 83 deaths had been reported, out of a population of 200,874, an infection rate of more than 2.5%. The cause of the outbreak was decreased vaccination rates among newborns, from 74% in 2017 to 31–34% in 2018. Nearby islands had rates near 99%.

On 17 November, a state of emergency was declared, closing all schools, keeping children under 17 away from public events, and mandating vaccination. On 2 December, the government imposed a curfew and cancelled all Christmas celebrations and public gatherings. Families seeking MMR vaccination were asked by the government to display a red cloth in front of their homes to alert mobile medical teams traveling the island during the lockdown. Some added messages like "Help!" or "I want to live!"

On 5 and 6 December, the government shut down public services except for water and electricity and reposted civil servants to the vaccination campaign. On 7 December, the curfew was lifted when the government estimated that the vaccination program had reached 90% of the population. On 14 December, the state of emergency was extended to 29 December. Samoan anti-vaccination activist Edwin Tamasese was arrested and charged with "incitement against a government order". By 22 December 2019, an estimated 94% of the eligible population had been vaccinated.

== Background ==
A hypothetical measles timeline from exposure to illness

Measles arrived in Samoa in 1893, carried by a steamer from New Zealand. By the end of 1893, over 1,000 people, of a population of 34,500, had died from measles. Measles is much more contagious than other infectious diseases such as polio, which only requires an 80% vaccination rate for the population to attain herd immunity.

In 2019, measles broke out across the Pacific region, including in Tonga, Fiji, the Philippines and New Zealand, but only Samoa suffered casualties, due to its low vaccination rate.

=== Vaccine hesitancy ===
The outbreak is attributed to Samoa's sharp drop in measles vaccination from the previous year.

In 2013, 90% of babies in Samoa received the measles-mumps-rubella vaccination (MMR) at one year of age.

On 6 July 2018, on the east coast of Savaiʻi, two 12-month-old children died after receiving MMR vaccinations. The cause of death was incorrect preparation of the vaccine by two nurses, who mixed vaccine powder with expired atracurium instead of the appropriate diluent (sterile water). These deaths were used by anti-vaccine groups to incite vaccination fear on social media. This caused the government to suspend its measles vaccination programme for ten months, despite contrary advice from the World Health Organization (WHO). The incident cost many Samoan residents their trust in the healthcare system.

From October 1, 2018 to late November 2018, UNICEF provided 115,500 measles vaccines doses to Samoa, including the diluent, syringes and safety boxes, and shipped Vitamin A supplies. UNICEF and WHO estimate that the newborn measles vaccination rate fell from 74% in 2017 to 34% in 2018. Vaccination rates dropped to 31% in Samoa, compared to 99% in nearby Nauru, Niue, Cook Islands, and American Samoa. In March 2019, the WHO and UN children's agency UNICEF warned the Pacific to take proactive measures and improve immunisation rates.

In June 2019, American anti-vaccination activist Robert F. Kennedy Jr. visited Samoa to meet with local anti-vaccination activists including Taylor Winterstein and Edwin Tamanese, whom he called a "medical freedom hero". Kennedy also discussed vaccines with then-Prime Minister Tuilaʻepa Saʻilele Malielegaoi, and campaigned against the vaccine on social media.

== 2019 outbreak ==
In August 2019, an infected passenger on one of the more than 8,000 annual flights between New Zealand and Samoa probably brought the disease from Auckland to Upolu. An outbreak began in October 2019 and continued for four months. Before seeking proper medical treatment, some parents first took their children to 'traditional healers' who used machines purchased that claimed to produce "immune-protective" water.

As of 22 December, there were 79 deaths. This was 0.4 deaths per 1,000 people, based on a population of 200,874, an infection fatality rate of 1.43%. There were 5,520 cases, representing 2.75% of the population. 61 of the first 70 deaths were aged four and under. All but seven of the deaths were from people aged under 15.

At least 20% of babies aged six to 11 months contracted measles. One in 150 babies died.

By 20 December 2019, 94% of the population had been vaccinated, versus the 95% required for herd immunity.

After the outbreak started, anti-vaxxers, including Kennedy, attributed the dozens of measles deaths to poverty and malnutrition or to the vaccine, but cited no evidence for these claims. Clinicians reported that Vitamin A deficiency or immunodeficiency did not appear to be a substantial contributing factor to the outbreak.

=== Government response ===
Initially, schools remained open after the outbreak was declared. The Samoan government initially did not accept humanitarian support.

On 17 November, a state of emergency was declared, ordering the closure of all schools, keeping children under 17 away from public events, and making vaccination mandatory. UNICEF sent 110,500 vaccine doses. Tonga and Fiji also declared states of emergency. Tonga closed all schools for several days. American Samoa required all travelers from Tonga and Samoa to present proof of vaccination. In Fiji, vaccines were prioritised for young children and overseas travellers.

On 2 December 2019, the government imposed a curfew and cancelled all Christmas celebrations and public gatherings. All unvaccinated families were ordered to display a red flag or red cloth in front of their homes to warn others and to aid mass vaccination efforts. The Royal New Zealand Air Force transported medical supplies and equipment to Samoa. Medical teams from New Zealand, Australia, the United Kingdom, France and its overseas territory of French Polynesia assisted Samoan medical authorities.

On 5 and 6 December, the government shut down everything other than public utilities, and assigned all available civil servants to the vaccination campaign.

Edwin Tamasese, a Samoan anti-vaccination activist with no medical training who was also the chair of a coconut farmers' collective, was charged with "incitement against a government order". He had posted online comments like "Enjoy your killing spree." He encouraged people to refuse immunisation, as he believed the vaccine caused measles, and even discouraged life-saving antibiotics. Tamasese faced up to two years in prison.

On 7 December, the curfew was lifted when the government estimated that 90% of the population had been reached by the vaccination program. On 19 December, Parliament passed a bill to make measles vaccinations mandatory in 2020.

As of 29 December, a public inquiry into the government's role in suspending vaccinations had not been announced. Deputy director of health Gaualofa Matalavea Saaga stated, "Having our case blasted out to the world is the last thing we want." Samoa's political opposition called for the health minister to be removed.

On 31 December, Prime Minister Tuilaʻepa Saʻilele Malielegaoi addressed the nation about the measles outbreak. He acknowledged the support of the Samoan diaspora and 49 medical teams from across the world.

=== International response ===
Many organisations and countries responded:

- American Samoa declared a measles outbreak and closed public schools and park gatherings and suspended all entry permits for those travelling through Samoa and Tonga to American Samoa.
- Australian Medical Assistance Teams (AUSMAT) sent a team of nurses, doctors, and public health experts, and medical equipment and supplies to Samoa. They left on 3 January 2020, after eight weeks in Samoa in one of its longest-ever missions.
- Fiji through UNFPA
- French Polynesia sent a team of paediatric nurses.
- Israel sent Intensive Care teams. along with a team of two paediatricians, six nurses and one physiotherapist trained in disaster medicine from the Israel Center for Disaster Medicine and Humanitarian Response.
- New Zealand sent three rotations of the New Zealand Medical Assistance Team (NZMAT) of doctors, nurses and logistics specialists who supported Leulumoega Hospital and Faleolo Clinic for six weeks. New Zealand also sent a team of nurse vaccinators, 3,000 vaccination doses and vaccine fridges in mid-November, and a small number of Intensive Care Clinicians. Residents of Rotorua, New Zealand sent two dozen infant-size coffins decorated with flowers and butterflies to Samoan families. On 14 December 2019, New Zealand Foreign Minister Winston Peters announced $1 million in funds towards preventive efforts in the Pacific.
- United Kingdom EMT sent two rotations of doctors, nurses, physiotherapists, an anaesthetist, and an epidemiologist for four weeks of support from the end of November to December 2019. UK Save the Children helped out.
- United States: Hawaii sent 75 doctors and nurses for two days at the beginning of December to assist with vaccination.

==== Organisations ====
- UNICEF sent 200,000 vaccines.
- WHO deployed 128 medical teams to assist in vaccination. The UN Central Emergency Response Fund (CERF) allocated $2.7 million to support the response in Samoa, Tonga, and Fiji.
- The World Bank gave a US$3.5 million grant to support the response to the outbreak and another US$9.3m grant over the next five years to improve the health system.

=== Others ===
As of January 2020, the following other countries had sent aid:

- American Samoa
- China
- Japan
- Kiribati
- Norway
- Papua New Guinea
- Solomon Islands

Various organisations

- Save the Children
- PACMAT
- Blacktown Doctors Medical Centre
- Samoa mo Samoa Doctors Worldwide
- Counties Manuka District Health Board
- ADRA
- Pacific Community (SPC)
- Médecins Sans Frontières

== Aftermath ==
In November 2019, Tuilaepa said he would propose legislation to penalise parents who refused to vaccinate their children. The Samoan government allocated US$2.5 million for relief work.

In December 2019, immunology experts questioned the role of social media, primarily Facebook, and how social media facilitated the spread of vaccination hesitancy during the outbreak. The Immunisation Advisory Centre in New Zealand said that the Samoan crisis was a sign that social media needs to deal with dangerous misinformation.

By 25 January 2020, Tuilaepa had resisted calls for an inquiry. Opposition MP Olo Fiti Vaʻai continued to call for an inquiry and was "apologising on behalf of Parliament and telling the people of Samoa that the government had failed miserably."

In August 2021, following the ousting of the HRPP in the 2021 Samoan general election, new Health Minister Valasi Toogamaga Tafito announced he was considering an inquiry into the outbreak.

== See also ==
- Taylor Winterstein, Samoan anti-vaccination campaigner
- Robert F. Kennedy Jr., American anti-vaccination campaigner
- 2019 Tonga measles outbreak
- 2019 New Zealand measles outbreak
- 2019 Philippines measles outbreak
- Chemophobia
- Measles resurgence in the United States
- Vaccination
- Vaccine hesitancy
- 2019 in Oceania
- 2025 Southwest United States measles outbreak
