= Measles resurgence in the United States =

Sharp increase in measles cases between 2010 and 2025

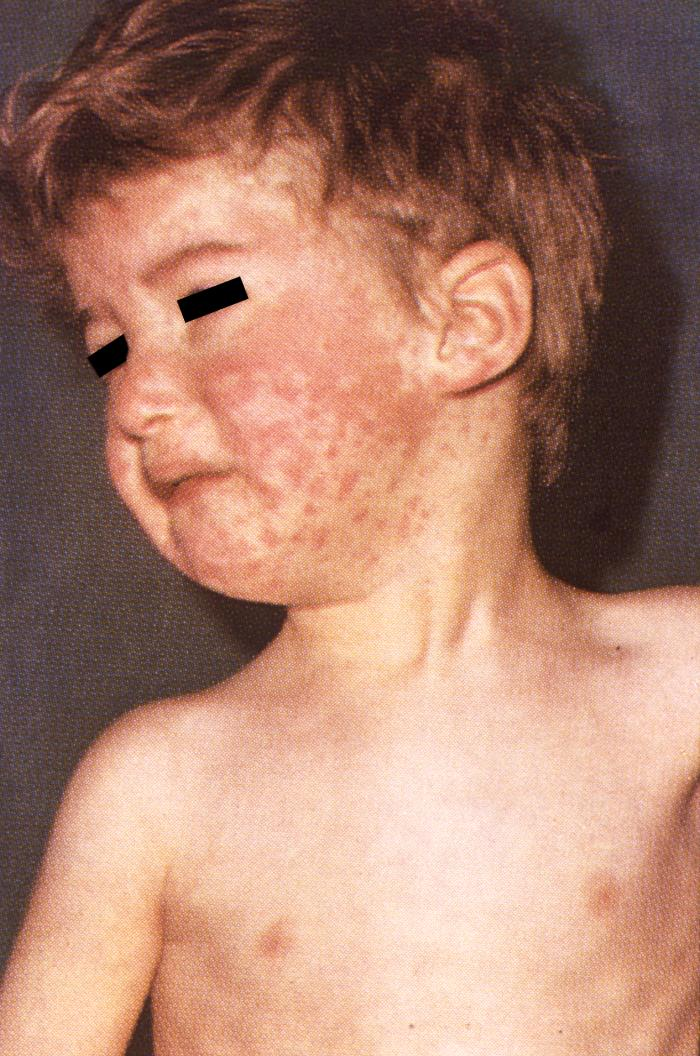
Young boy with measles in 1968

Measles was declared eliminated from the United States in 2000, by the World Health Organization (WHO) due to the success of vaccination efforts. However, it continues to be reintroduced—especially when unvaccinated people travel out of the United States to places where measles is present. Anti-vaccination sentiment continues to exacerbate the reemergence of measles outbreaks.

Measles is one of the most contagious infectious diseases. If not immunized, a person exposed to someone with measles has a 95% chance of becoming infected. During the early stage of an outbreak in an unvaccinated population, each infected person spreads the disease to an average of 12 to 18 other people. The recommended measles vaccination protocol is to receive two doses, at least one month apart. One dose of the vaccination is 93 percent effective at preventing measles, while two doses is 97 percent effective.

The United States has experienced variable trends in measles outbreaks in the 21st century, with major outbreaks occurring in 2014–2015, 2019, and in 2025–2026. In 2025, the CDC reported 2,289 confirmed cases across 45 jurisdictions and 49 separate outbreaks. In July 2026, the U.S. Centers for Disease Control and Prevention had logged 2,318 cases of measles thus far in 2026, which meant it was the worst year for measles in more than three decades. Experts say cases likely are significantly undercounted as many go unreported.

Since 2000, the largest single outbreak in the United States has been the 2025–2026 South Carolina measles outbreak with 997 total cases as of April 2026.

The vast majority of people infected in the 21st century were not vaccinated and lived in close-knit communities where the immunization rate is lower than average. There is concern that the WHO may rescind the US's measles elimination status.

In 2026, the incidence of measles in the United States reached its highest level in three decades, with 2,371 cases documented in July 2026. On November 13, 2026, the United States was officially deemed to have lost its measles elimination status.

== Background and overview ==
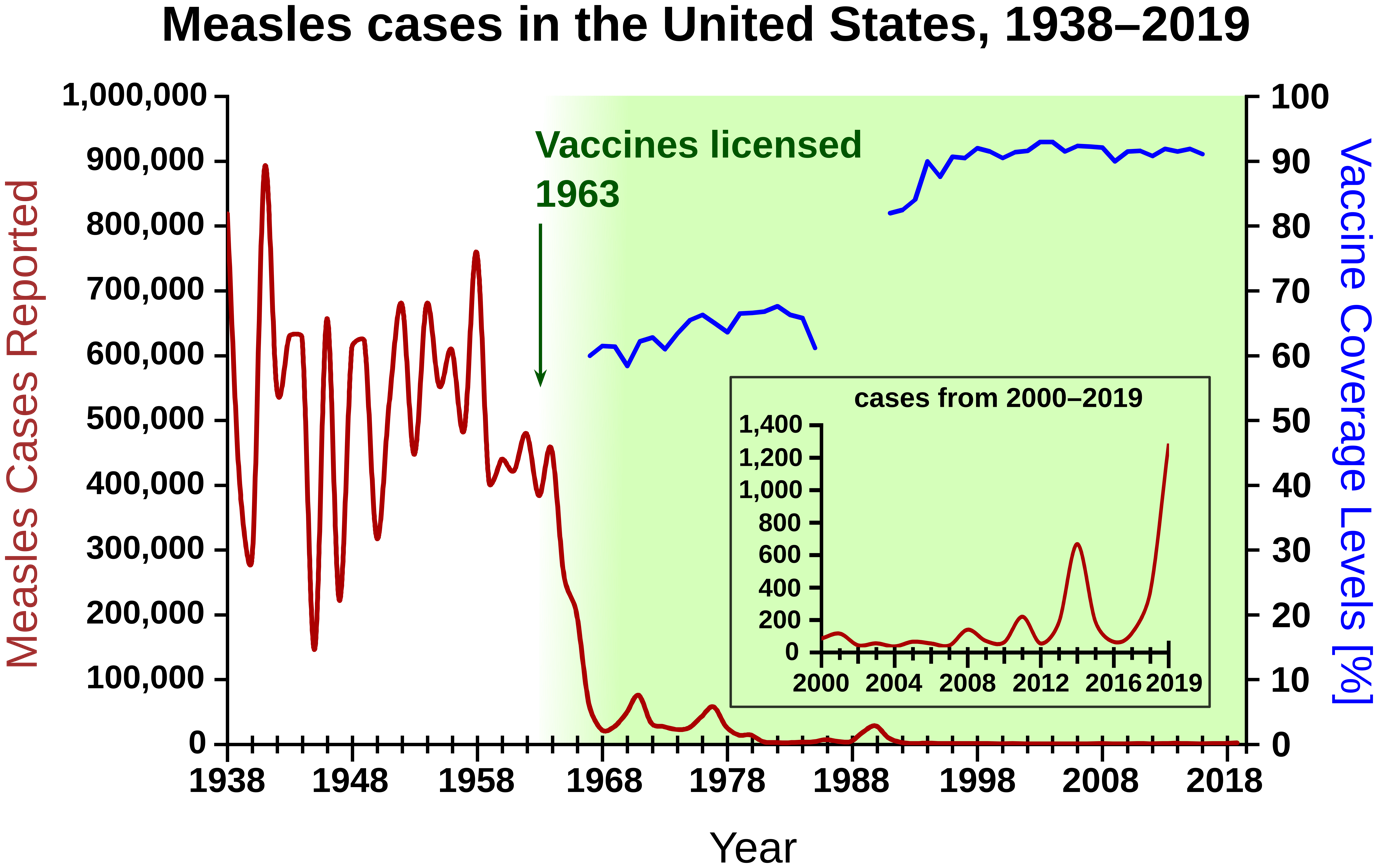
Measles cases in the US from 1938 to 2019

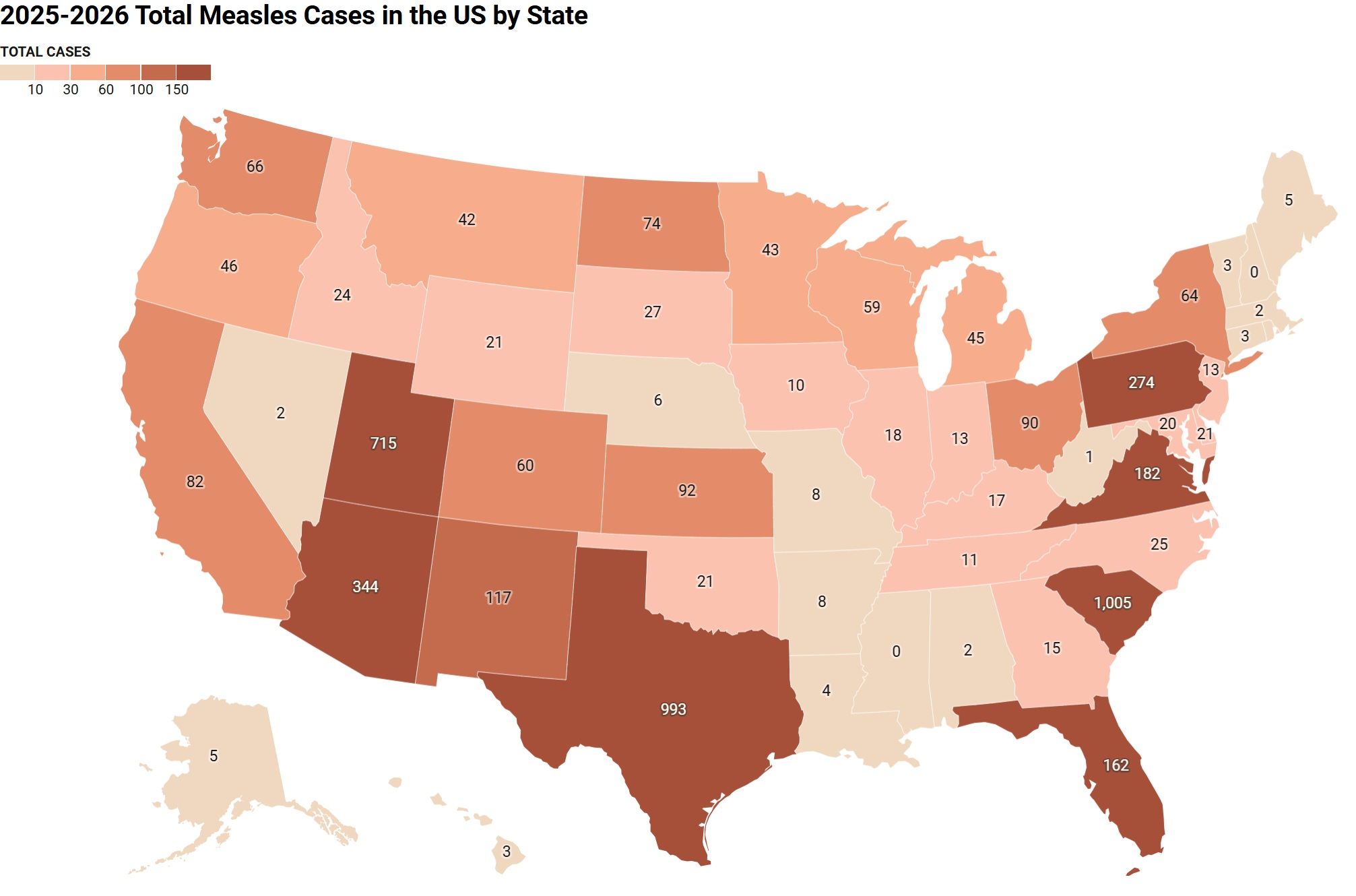
2025 to 2026 total measles cases by US State as of August 13, 2026

Before the vaccine was available in the United States, the Centers for Disease Control and Prevention (CDC) estimated that about three to four million were infected each year, of which approx. 500,000 were reported, with 400 to 500 people dying and 48,000 being hospitalized as a result. The last major outbreak was before the disease was eliminated, and occurred from 1989 to 1991. During this outbreak, 123 people died, the majority of whom were preschool children.

In the United States on average, two or three out of every 1000 children infected will die, and one will develop complications that often result in permanent brain damage.

The 2019 outbreak prompted President Donald Trump to shift away from his previous goal of spacing out vaccinations, and to insist that parents must vaccinate their children, stating "They have to get the shots. The vaccinations are so important". Surgeon General Jerome Adams drew a connection between states with vaccine exemptions and higher risks of outbreaks, and advised health officials on ways to encourage vaccination.

The 2025 outbreak began soon after Trump's inauguration for his second term as president and the subsequent appointment of Robert F. Kennedy Jr., a promoter of vaccine misinformation, as the Secretary of Health. Kennedy initially downplayed the outbreak, describing it as "not unusual". In 2025 the US had 2,012 measles cases, its highest since 1992 when it reported 2,200 cases.

An April 2025 study estimated that 51.2 million measles cases will occur over the next 25 years due to the decline in childhood vaccination.

On November 17, 2026, the Pan American Health Organization formally announced that it withdrew measles elimination status from the US, Bolivia, and Mexico, and stated that endemic measles transmission had restarted in all three countries.

Yearly cases of measles in the United States 2000–2026
Year	Cases
2000	85
2001	116
2002	44
2003	56
2004	37
2005	66
2006	55
2007	43
2008	140
2009	72
2010	63
2011	220
2012	55
2013	187
2014	667
2015	191
2016	86
2017	120
2018	381
2019	1,274
2020	13
2021	49
2022	121
2023	59
2024	285
2025	2,289
2026 (to date)	5,838

== Major outbreaks ==
=== 2015 ===
In a 2015 measles outbreak, 147 cases were linked to exposure at Disneyland in California. Following this outbreak, California changed its vaccination laws to only allow vaccination exemptions for those with medical conditions.

In 2019, cases were reported in 23 states, and the total number of reported cases (764) reached the highest number in 25 years by April. More than 500 of these cases were people who were not vaccinated against measles, and another 125 had an unknown vaccination status. The bulk of those infected were from the Orthodox Jewish communities in and around New York City.

=== 2018 New Jersey outbreak ===
The Centers for Disease Control and Prevention (CDC) declared an outbreak in New Jersey in 2018. 30 of the 33 confirmed cases were in Ocean County. It was determined that measles was contracted by a person who traveled to Israel and spread the virus upon returning to New Jersey.

=== 2019 California outbreak ===
From January to April 2019, 21 cases of measles were reported in California. The CDC published a summary of one outbreak caused by an unvaccinated teenager traveling to England. During the 2019 resurgence, two California universities, Cal State Los Angeles and University of California, Los Angeles, had to quarantine over 300 students and faculty.

=== 2019 Pacific Northwest outbreak ===
The areas surrounding Vancouver, Washington, namely in Clark County, experienced an outbreak of measles in late 2018 and early 2019. The area was referred to as an "anti-vaccination hotspot" and the vaccination rate was 78%, which is too low for herd immunity. Oregon had reported that four residents have contracted measles due to the outbreak in neighboring Clark County.

As of April 2019, 74 confirmed cases of measles had been reported to the health department. More than half of those who fell ill were under the age of 10, and 70 of them had not been vaccinated or had unknown vaccination status. The remaining three people had received one dose of the measles vaccine.

In response to the outbreak, Representative Paul Harris proposed a measure that would remove the ability for parents to refuse any of the required childhood vaccines for philosophical reasons, otherwise keeping medical and religious exemptions. The bill was later amended to limit exemptions for the measles, mumps, rubella vaccine (MMR) vaccine. Children would not be allowed to attend public or private schools or day-care without evidence of vaccination or approved exemption documents. The bill was passed in April 2019.

=== 2019 New York outbreak ===
New York experienced outbreaks in New York City and Rockland County in 2018 and 2019.

Between October 2018 and April 2019, 423 confirmed cases of measles were reported in New York City. The areas of Williamsburg and Borough Park, two Brooklyn neighborhoods with a high concentration of Orthodox Jews, have been most heavily affected. In response to the outbreak, Mayor Bill de Blasio declared a state of emergency and ordered mandatory vaccinations in the neighborhoods corresponding to the ZIP codes 11205, 11206, 11211, and 11249. It required that everyone living or working in the neighborhood who is more than six months old receive a vaccination or be subject to a $1,000 fine. Prior to the order, the health commissioner had required schools and day care centers in the area deny service to unvaccinated students to prevent the disease from spreading. In April, city officials ordered the closure of a preschool that refused to cooperate with requests for vaccination information.

From October to April, 153 cases of measles were confirmed in Rockland County, New York. Despite 17,000 doses of the MMR vaccination being given, the vaccination rate of children in the area was 72.9 percent as of April.

In December 2018, public health officials in Rockland County banned unvaccinated students from attending school. Parents of 42 students at Green Meadow Waldorf School, a private school, sued the Rockland County health department, but a judge denied the request to overturn the order. According to the health department, Green Meadow Waldorf School had a 56% vaccination rate. Waldorf schools have been identified as having higher noncompliance with measles vaccination programmes.

In March 2019, a flight attendant flew from NYC to Tel Aviv, Israel. Passengers on the flight were informed several days later that the woman had developed measles encephalitis and was in the intensive care unit (ICU) on a ventilator. The Israeli Ministry of Health reported that the woman may have been exposed in New York or in Israel. According to Emma Green the identification of the outbreak with the Jewish community led some leaders in the community to see a corresponding rise in expressions of antisemitism, although Hamodia and other Jewish thought leaders were encouraging vaccinations.

In April 2019, a state of emergency was declared in Rockland County, and unvaccinated children were barred from public places for 30 days. Parents of unvaccinated children that did not abide by this condition faced up to six months in jail or a $500 fine. A judge later lifted this ban, saying that the outbreak did not qualify for an emergency order. That month, New York began considering legislation to join the seven states and Washington, D.C. that allow children 14 years of age and older to seek vaccination without parental consent.

In June 2019, New York enacted a law repealing religious and philosophical exemptions for vaccination.

=== 2019 Michigan outbreak ===
A man from New York traveled to Michigan in March 2019, while unknowingly infected with measles. Health officials reported that he spread the virus to 38 people there. Because he was fundraising for Orthodox Jewish charities, he visited several synagogues each day while there. The man believed that he was immune to measles because he had it as a child.

=== 2024 Florida outbreak ===
A measles outbreak in Florida began in February 2024, at Manatee Bay Elementary School in Broward County. The State Surgeon General of Florida, Joseph Ladapo, addressed a letter to parents amid the outbreak, acknowledging the "normal" recommendation that unvaccinated children stay home, but stating his department was "deferring to parents or guardians to make decisions about school attendance." Ladapo's advice contradicts CDC guidance, which suggests that anyone not previously infected with measles or immunized against the disease observe a 21-day quarantine. On March 8, the Broward public school district declared the outbreak had ended on March 7.

Katelyn Jetelina and Kristen Panthagani referred to Ladapo's advice that children without immunization to measles could continue attending school after exposure as "unprecedented and dangerous". Leana Wen characterized Ladapo's decision as "outrageous" due to the danger posed by measles.

=== 2024 Chicago outbreak ===
In March 2024, the Chicago Department of Public Health declared it had detected two measles cases. The two measles cases were Chicago's first since 2019. The cases were detected in a migrant shelter in the Pilsen neighborhood at 2241 S. Halsted Street.

More cases at the shelter were reported the week of March 10. On March 12, a Centers for Disease Control and Prevention team arrived in Chicago to assist with the outbreak. On March 13, the Chicago Department of Public Health announced that all residents of the shelter able to receive a vaccine had received one. On March 14, two cases were reported in Chicago Public Schools, Cooper Dual Language Academy and Armour Elementary, bringing the total cases in the city to 10. On March 15, Chicago announced it would require migrants at city shelters receive the MMR vaccine. As of March 15, there were 12 cases of measles in the city.

=== 2025 Southwest outbreak ===
In late January 2025, measles cases were first reported in the South Plains region of Texas, marking the start of a major regional outbreak. The outbreak ultimately grew to 762 confirmed cases and spread beyond Texas into Oklahoma and New Mexico before being declared over in August 2025. It primarily affected children and teenagers, with nearly all of whom were either unvaccinated or of unknown vaccination status. Three deaths were attributed to the outbreak: two children in Texas and one adult in New Mexico.

The outbreak occurred amid a decline in vaccination rates in some communities. Although Texas and New Mexico have high overall vaccination rates (94.3% and 95% among kindergarteners, respectively), exemptions have been rising, particularly in Texas. The affected area includes a large Mennonite community, which typically has low vaccination rates due to religious beliefs. In West Texas, some of the affected counties had vaccination rates as low as 77.3% (for the two-dose series) among kindergartners for 2024-2025 school year. These data do not capture homeschooled students—reportedly many children in the affected area were homeschooled—and therefore the actual MMR vaccination rates for children in the region may have been lower.

=== 2025 Iowa outbreak ===
In May and June 2025, Iowa health officials confirmed six cases of measles in Iowa. 2019 was the last year with Iowa having a reported measles case. In June 2025, the Iowa Department of Health and Human Services revealed an 84% immunization rate for 1 MMR (Measles, Mumps, and Rubella) for two-year-olds in Iowa. Only Crawford, Shelby, Page, Clarke, Madison, Dallas, Buena Vista, Humboldt, Winneshiek, Wright, and Grundy counties meet the 95% vaccination rate of 1 MMR for 2-year-olds to gain herd immunity. As of June 2025, Davis County had an immunization rate of 41%.

By December 2025 outbreaks of measles became focused in communities of Mormon polygamists along the border region of Utah and Arizona. 275 cases were reported by mid December in this outbreak.

=== 2025–2026 South Carolina outbreak ===
An outbreak in South Carolina began in Fall 2025, when the state's health department reported an initial eight measles cases on October 2. The number of cases increased to 176 by the end of the year. The outbreak was concentrated in South Carolina's "upstate" region; as of February 2026, 96% of confirmed cases were found in Spartanburg County, being described as the "ground zero" of the measles epidemic.

By January 27, 2026, the number of confirmed cases grew to 789—the largest outbreak since 2000, surpassing the number of cases in the 2025 outbreak in the American Southwest.

As of February 3, 2026, the state had confirmed 876 cases. Of those, 22 patients were fully vaccinated, 16 were partially vaccinated, and 38 had an unknown status. Almost two-thirds of cases (555) occurred in patients ages 5 to 17, and 233 cases were in children under the age of 5 years. The outbreak was linked to cases identified in Ohio, North Carolina, Washington, and California.

The state's case count stopped at 997 on March 20. Of the confirmed cases in South Carolina, most cases (639) were among children and adolescents ages 5 to 17, who were unvaccinated (932). Meanwhile, 20 patients had received partial vaccination, 26 had full vaccination, and 19 had an unknown vaccination status. The outbreak was declared officially over on April 27 as no cases were reported for 42 days, twice the incubation period of the virus.

Analysis of the outbreak from October 2025 through April 2026 examined vaccination rates at schools in the outbreak area and found that mean vaccination coverage (two doses of MMR vaccine) at schools exposed to the outbreak was 82.5%, compared with 91% for schools not exposed to the outbreak.

A major factor in the measles epidemic was skepticism over vaccinations, such as concerns over autism.

=== 2026 Utah outbreak ===
As of April 21, 2026, 607 individuals have been diagnosed with measles in the Utah outbreak, 410 of which were diagnosed in 2026. In the past three weeks, there have been 31 new reported cases, as transmission in the state continues. Unlike previous outbreaks since 2000, which have largely been localized in counties where community immunization rates are lower than average, the Utah outbreak has emerged in 22 of the 29 counties in the state, indicating the widespread nature of this outbreak.

The 2026 Utah outbreak has been attributed to an outbreak that started along the Utah-Arizona border in August 2025, and has since taken hold in vulnerable pockets with low vaccination rates. Widespread transmission is made possible by an increasingly susceptible population, largely on younger children and adolescents who are unvaccinated. In the 2024-2025 school year, Utah school children had an 88.6% vaccination rate. This is largely attributable to the high rates of exemptions for MMR vaccines, missing documentation, or exemptions to all school-required vaccines. Recent proposals going through state legislature in Utah would make it easier for families to get immunization exemptions from public school vaccine requirements by removing online educational module requirements that were previously needed to obtain exemption forms, which will take effect on July 1, 2026, if it passes. This reflects a nationwide shift away from vaccination, with rising concern among public health officials about increases in the size and scale of outbreaks.

=== 2026 Pennsylvania outbreak ===
An outbreak of measles in Pennsylvania has resulted in 943 cases in 39 counties, hospitalizing 176 people, and killing 5 people as of September 30, 2026. The first four deaths were two infants, a 40-year-old female, and an 18-year-old. By September 23, the number of cases had passed 800, reaching 835. As of October 16, the outbreak had 1260 cases confirmed, along with 238 hospitalisations and possibly a sixth death.

Following the announcement of the first two deaths, United States Secretary of Health and Human Services Robert F. Kennedy Jr. ordered the deaths to be removed from the CDC's measles tracker, falsely suggesting that the deaths were not caused by measles.

In recent years, public confidence in childhood vaccines against potentially fatal diseases such as measles has declined in the United States. A Reuters/Ipsos poll conducted in September 2026 found that 76% of Americans considered the measles, mumps, and rubella (MMR) vaccine safe for children – a decrease from 84% recorded in a comparable Reuters/Ipsos survey in May 2020. The erosion of confidence was most evident among Republicans, a segment of the population in which some political figures have publicly questioned the necessity of routine childhood immunization.

This decline in vaccine confidence has coincided with the largest measles outbreak in the United States in decades. Measles, a highly contagious viral disease that had been effectively eliminated from the country for over twenty years, re-emerged following a sustained drop in vaccination coverage. National vaccination rates among kindergarten children fell to 92.5% in 2025, below the 95% threshold that epidemiologists consider necessary to maintain herd immunity and protect individuals who cannot be vaccinated for medical reasons.

Other states experienced the same epidemic to a less substantial effect. On November 2, 2026, New York health officials reported the measles-associated death of a child in Lewis County, the state's first such death in more than 30 years. As of October 24, the state had recorded 178 measles cases in 2026, including eight in New York City. On November 5, Wisconsin officials reported the death of an infant from measles amid an ongoing outbreak in the southwestern part of the state, its first measles death since 1990. As of November 3, Wisconsin had recorded 431 measles cases across 13 counties in 2026, its highest number in more than 35 years, with nine hospitalizations.

== Public health actions ==
With the 2019 outbreak, the CDC stated that it may use its ability to put people on a "Do Not Board" list for air travel should people known to be carrying measles continue to fly. This list was established in 2007, aiming to reduce the spread of tuberculosis, but was used to restrict travel of two people during the 2014 measles outbreak. The CDC has, in the past, told some individuals that they believe might have been infected with measles to not use air travel, with those patients voluntarily agreeing to alter travel plans. The CDC states that normally it would be extremely rare to catch measles from an infected passenger due to the overall high rate of vaccinated passengers on average, but the anti-vaccination trends threatens to disrupt that model.

Social media platforms have made their own efforts to prevent the dissemination of false anti-vaccination claims. As of September 2018, Pinterest had banned users from searching for content about vaccines. In February 2019, YouTube stated that any user or channel endorsing anti-vaccination content will be demonetized entirely, and not receive any funding for advertisements played before videos.

A number of US states tightened vaccine exemptions in the wake of outbreaks, including New York, Washington, and Maine. Vaccination opponents forced a referendum on the issue in Maine, but the new restrictions prevailed with over 70% of voters supporting them.

According to federal statistics, measles, mumps, and rubella (MMR) vaccine coverage among kindergarten-age kids in the United States has fallen to 92.4 percent in the 2025-2026 school year, below the 95 percent point generally considered essential to prevent sustained measles transmission.

== See also ==
- 2019 Samoa measles outbreak
- Child abuse
- Measles resurgence in Europe
- History of public health in the United States
