= Tony Lyons =

American book publisher and political activist

Tony Lyons is an American book publisher and political activist, best known as the founder and president of Skyhorse Publishing, an independent book publishing company based in New York City. Lyons, a political supporter of Robert F. Kennedy Jr., co-founded the hybrid PAC American Values 2024 to support Kennedy's 2024 presidential candidacy.

== Early life and education ==
Tony Lyons was raised on the Upper West Side of Manhattan. His father, Nick Lyons, was a writer and publisher, and his mother was an artist. Lyons graduated from Albany Law School in 1993.

== Career ==
In 1997, Lyons took over as president and publisher of The Lyons Press, a publishing company established by his father. The company focused on niche markets, publishing books on nature and history. In 2001, The Lyons Press was sold to Globe Pequot Press. Lyons continued with the company until 2004.

In 2006, Lyons founded Skyhorse Publishing, naming the company after Brando Skyhorse, a former editor at The Lyons Press. Skyhorse established itself by publishing a diverse range of titles, including controversial works that other publishers had declined — this includes works by Norman Mailer, Blake Bailey, Robert W. Malone, Robert F. Kennedy, and Woody Allen, including Allen's Apropos of Nothing and Kennedy's The Real Anthony Fauci, both The New York Times bestsellers. In addition to publishing genres such as nature, sports, history, philosophy, religion, current events, politics, science fiction, and children's literature, Skyhorse has published many books on health freedom, Big Pharma, and the assassinations of President John F. Kennedy, Presidential candidate Robert F. Kennedy, Martin Luther King Jr., and Malcolm X. Skyhorse is distributed by Simon & Schuster in the U.S. and abroad.

Skyhorse expanded its catalog with Lyons' acquisitions of Arcade Publishing (2010), Good Books (2014), and Regnery Publishing (2023).

In 2014, Lyons and Skyhorse Publishing won a defamation lawsuit against Kenny Kramer, the inspiration for television character Cosmo Kramer on the Seinfeld show. Lyons commented, "We are thrilled that Kenny Kramer's absolutely ludicrous lawsuit was dismissed. It's a triumph not only for Skyhorse Publishing but for the entire book community."

== Political work ==
Lyons is a political supporter of Robert F. Kennedy Jr. The hybrid PAC American Values 2024, (Note: As of 2025, the PAC had been renamed MAHA. It continues to support Kennedy's political aspirations.) co-founded by Lyons in 2022, raised nearly $50 million to support Kennedy's run for the U.S. presidency. Lyons was involved in the creation of the $7 million ad that aired during Super Bowl LVIII in February 2024 promoting Kennedy's independent presidential candidacy.

In August 2024, after Kennedy withdrew from the presidential race, Lyons announced that he was joining the Trump campaign.

Lyons has been described as a central organizer within the Make America Healthy Again movement, playing a key role in coordinating its political, media, and advocacy efforts in alignment with Robert F. Kennedy Jr.. He is affiliated with several organizations tied to the movement, including a political action committee and multiple nonprofit groups. Reporting by The Wall Street Journal indicates that Lyons has also been involved in fundraising efforts aimed at securing up to $100 million to support candidates aligned with the movement.

== Advocacy and board membership ==
In 2023, Lyons joined the Board of Directors of the National Coalition Against Censorship (NCAC), a nonprofit organization dedicated to defending freedom of thought, inquiry, and expression from censorship. NCAC represents 59 national education, publishing, arts, and civil liberty organizations and provides resources to resist censorship and promote free expression.

== Personal life ==
Tony Lyons resides in New York City. He has two daughters.
