= Mary Richardson Kennedy =

American designer and philanthropist (1959–2012)

- Born: Mary Kathleen Richardson; October 4, 1959; Bayonne, New Jersey, U.S.
- Died: May 16, 2012 (aged 52); Bedford, New York, U.S.
- Cause of death: Suicide by hanging
- Education: Brown University; Rhode Island School of Design
- Occupations: Interior designer; architect; philanthropist
- Spouse: Robert F. Kennedy Jr. (m. 1994; sep. 2010)
- Children: 4

Mary Kathleen Richardson Kennedy (née Richardson; October 4, 1959 – May 16, 2012) was an American interior designer, political fundraiser, and philanthropist. A proponent of green building and co-founder of the Food Allergy Initiative, the largest fund for food allergy research in the United States, Richardson was regarded as an effective and resourceful fundraiser. She worked on Democratic campaigns, including Ted Kennedy's 1980 presidential bid and Joe Kennedy's congressional campaign in 1986. Educated at Brown University and later the Rhode Island School of Design, she also briefly worked at Andy Warhol's Factory in New York. Richardson was married to Robert F. Kennedy Jr., and their legal separation in 2010 was highly publicized. Her 2012 suicide also received significant national attention.

== Early life and education ==
Mary Kathleen Richardson was born on October 4, 1959, and was raised in Hoboken, New Jersey. Her father, John F. Richardson, who died when she was 12 years old, was an attorney and a professor at Stevens Institute of Technology. Richardson's mother, Nancy Higgins, was a public school English teacher. Richardson had four sisters and two brothers.

She attended The Putney School, where she became friends and roommates with Kerry Kennedy, the daughter of Robert F. Kennedy and Ethel Skakel Kennedy. She later roomed with Kerry Kennedy in college and served as her maid of honor at her wedding in 1990 to Andrew Cuomo.

As a Fine Arts major at Brown University, Richardson spent her junior year in New York City, where she worked in publishing at Interview, the magazine founded by Pop artist Andy Warhol. She was photographed for the March 1980 issue of Interview. She later pursued studies in architectural design at the Rhode Island School of Design (RISD).

== Career ==
When Joe Kennedy founded Citizens Energy in 1979, Richardson designed, wrote, and produced the organization's first annual report and created its logo, which remains in use today.

In 1980, at age 20, Richardson worked on Ted Kennedy's presidential campaign. She helped raise millions of dollars in donated artworks from Warhol and other artists in his circle, including Robert Rauschenberg, Roy Lichtenstein, and Julian Schnabel.

In 1986, Richardson joined Joe Kennedy's congressional campaign, where she became known for her inventive fundraising and outreach efforts. On Election Day, she helped transform the traditional distribution of coffee and doughnuts by soliciting food donations from local restaurants, resulting in an unusually elaborate spread that distinguished the campaign from its rivals.

In the mid-1980s, she volunteered with the RFK Center for Justice and Human Rights to assist the Mothers of the Disappeared in El Salvador after U.S. military aid was cut to impoverished regions. As part of the effort, she successfully secured large-scale donations of food, clothing, and medical supplies from major retailers, helping assemble truckloads of humanitarian aid.

In 1993, Richardson worked for the firm Parrish Hadley Design as an architectural designer. She was involved in the renovation of the Naval Observatory in Washington, DC, the official residence of the Vice President of the United States. Her work involved green building practices and was certified through the Leadership in Energy and Environmental Design program. Following flood damage to her home in 2003, Richardson oversaw a massive salvage job and green rebuild project known as the Kennedy Green House Project.

In 1998, she co-founded the Food Allergy Initiative, the largest private fund for food allergy research in the United States.

== Personal life ==
Richardson lived in SoHo, Manhattan, in the 1980s, and was active in the bohemian culture. At that time, she was briefly involved with actor John Stockwell. Later in the 1980s, Richardson dated journalist Carlos Mavroleon. For a time, Richardson lived with film producer Michael Mailer.

=== Marriage and children ===
On April 15, 1994, Richardson married Robert F. Kennedy Jr., a brother of Kerry Kennedy, aboard a research vessel on the Hudson River. They had four children: Conor, Kyra, Aidan and William.

During their marriage, Kennedy was widely regarded as a serial philanderer and was known among his friends for sending explicit nude photos of women that they presumed he had taken, according to Vanity Fair. The highly publicized allegations of sexual assault against Kennedy by the family's then-babysitter, Eliza Cooney, took place during this period.

On May 10, 2010, Richardson called 911 to report that her husband had been verbally abusive to her and her children, according to The Journal News. Police responding to the call reported that Richardson appeared "visibly intoxicated" and had difficulty organizing her thoughts and explaining the reason for the call. A few days later, on May 12, Kennedy filed for divorce from Richardson. The following day, police were again called to the couple's home in response to a "domestic incident." Two days later, on May 15, Richardson was arrested and charged with driving under the influence. A court ordered that full temporary custody of her children be granted to her estranged husband. She pleaded guilty to a reduced charge for driving while intoxicated, resulting in a $500 fine, a 90-day license suspension, and court-mandated alcohol education. A subsequent drug-related impaired driving charge from August 2010 was dismissed in 2011 after a judge ruled there was insufficient evidence that she knowingly drove while impaired by prescription medication.

=== Mental health ===
According to reports published by The Daily Beast, Richardson struggled with severe mental health issues for many years, although her friends have pointed to Kennedy's multiple affairs and allegedly abusive behavior as contributing factors. She reportedly attempted suicide twice during the 1980s (in 1985, by suffocation with a plastic bag, and in 1986 by taking an overdose of barbiturates) and exhibited suicidal behavior in the 1990s. In a 1997 email, her brother Thomas Richardson wrote to Kennedy: "I know you think Mary’s going to kill herself, but I guarantee she won't. I may regret those words one day, but that’s how I feel." Richardson's family and friends would go on to blame Kennedy for her death, citing his serial philandering and alleged gaslighting.

== Death ==
On May 16, 2012, Richardson was found dead in a barn at her home in Bedford, New York. Her death was ruled a suicide by hanging. An autopsy revealed that she had antidepressants in her blood. The medical examiner's report noted her fingers were caught between her neck and the noose, indicating that she struggled to free herself. Upon arriving at the scene, Richardson's sister told Kennedy "you have killed my sister." Before her death, Richardson had discovered Kennedy's personal journal from 2001, in which he recorded sexual encounters with 37 different women. The journal also includes numerous entries in which Kennedy writes positively of Richardson but makes only passing mention of her purported mental health issues. According to Kennedy, Richardson passed the journal along "to her sisters with instructions that, if anything happened to her, [it should be] published in the press".

Her funeral, organized by the Kennedy family, was held at St. Patrick's Catholic Church in Bedford. On May 21, 2012, a memorial service organized by the Richardson family was held at the Standard Hotel in Manhattan.

A legal battle between her widower and her brother, Thomas W. Richardson, ensued over which family should have control over her remains. Kennedy won the court case and buried her beside his aunt, Eunice Kennedy Shriver and her husband, Sargent Shriver, at St. Francis Xavier Cemetery in Centerville, Massachusetts. Several days later, Kennedy moved Richardson's remains to an empty plot in the cemetery, and put up a gravestone. Media at the time reported that Kennedy negotiated to buy fifty plots surrounding Richardson's grave, and this was confirmed when Saoirse Kennedy Hill, Mary's niece, was interred beside her in 2019.
