= A Letter to Liberals =

2022 book by Robert F. Kennedy Jr.

A Letter to Liberals: Censorship and COVID: An Attack on Science and American Ideals
- Author: Robert F. Kennedy Jr.
- Subject: American politics
- Genre: Non-fiction
- Publisher: Skyhorse Publishing
- Publication date: August 2, 2022
- Pages: 120
- ISBN: 978-1510775589

A Letter to Liberals: Censorship and COVID: An Attack on Science and American Ideals is a 2022 book by Robert F. Kennedy Jr. The book accused the Democratic Party of the United States of lacking critical thinking, and urged the party to protect civil liberties, specifically the First Amendment to the United States Constitution.

The book was criticized by Current Affairs magazine for spreading misinformation regarding the COVID-19 pandemic, although it drew praise from The American Conservative.

== Publication ==
The 120-page book was written by Robert F. Kennedy Jr. and published on August 2, 2022, by Skyhorse Publishing.

== Synopsis ==
The book is critical of the Democratic Party, accusing its leadership of lacking critical thinking, intellectual curiosity, and faith in science. Kennedy accuses the party of accepting the government's public health measures implemented during the COVID-19 pandemic, which he paints as propaganda and unscientific.

The book calls on liberal Americans to protect civil liberties and the First Amendment, and to reject what Kennedy describes as cancel culture.

== Critical reception ==
Current Affairs described the book's claims as "deceptive, bogus, and easily refuted." It rejected Kennedy's assertions that vaccines cause autism and that hydroxychloroquine and ivermectin are effective treatments for COVID-19.

The American Conservative magazine described Kennedy's message as "urgent".

== See also ==
- Children's Health Defense
- COVID-19 misinformation by the United States
- The Real Anthony Fauci, 2021 book by the same author
- Robert F. Kennedy Jr. 2024 presidential campaign
