= Mari Lyons =

American modernist artist (1935-2016)

Mari Blumeau Lyons
- Self Portrait with Yellow Head Piece
- Born: Mari Blumeau; 1935; California
- Died: April 3, 2016; New York City, New York
- Education: Bard College (B.A., 1957), Cranbrook Academy of Art (MFA, 1958)
- Occupations: Painter and artist
- Known for: Modernist art

Mari Blumeau Lyons (1935-2016) was an American modernist artist, operating primarily in New York, who worked across a wide variety of media and styles.

== Early life ==
Mari was born in 1935 and began painting at an early age. As a child, she attended the Anna Head School. By age 13, she was taking courses at the California School of Fine Arts in San Francisco. When she turned 15, she took a course with Max Beckmann at Mills College. The next summer, Mari studied with Fletcher Martin, an artist with Life Magazine, who was very supportive of her art. She also studied for several months in Paris at the Académie de la Grande Chaumiere, at L'Atelier Fernand Leger, and at the Atelier 17 of painter/printmaker Stanley William Hayter.

== Education ==
Mari Lyons graduated from Bard College in 1957 with a bachelor’s degree in art. Her two main art professors were Louis Schanker and Stefan Hirsch. She also received a master’s of fine art (MFA) in painting from the Cranbrook Academy of Art in Michigan in 1958.

== Painting career ==
Mari moved with her husband Nick Lyons to Ann Arbor, Michigan in 1958, then to New York City in 1961, where she painted for forty years. Mari painted a wide variety of genres, including landscapes, cityscapes, portraits, and abstracts. Her work was done in the modernist style, though she used several different kinds of mediums as an artist, including watercolor and oil paints. While much of her painting was based around her studios in New York, she also traveled with her husband to Montana and painted landscapes there. She first exhibited her cityscapes in the 1980s and eventually exhibited her art across the United States.

== Awards and recognition ==
Mari had fourteen one-person shows at the First Street Gallery in New York City and several other shows of her work across New York and Michigan. Her work is represented widely in collections such as the “Climate Central Foundation, The Museum of the City of New York, Montana State University Library, Rider University, the DeGolyer Library (SMU), The New York State Museum (in Albany), Montana Museum of Art and Culture (Missoula)” and more. In addition, one her “Montana landscapes traveled to Tunis as part of the Art in Embassies Program of the U.S. Department of State”. Several of Mari’s paintings are displayed in Archives and Special Collections at Montana State University.

== Later years ==
Near the end of her life, Nick and Mari took up residence in New York City and Woodstock, New York. She maintained studios in both cities. Mari died on April 3, 2016.

== Selected publications illustrated by Mari ==
- Lyons, Nick., and Lyons, Mari. Sphinx Mountain and Brown Trout. Apalachicola, FL: Kevin Begos, 1997.
- Lyons, Nick., and Lyons, Mari. Fishing Stories: A Lifetime of Adventures and Misadventures on Rivers, Lakes, and Seas. 2014.
