= Nick Lyons =

American writer and publisher

- Born: Nick Lyons; 1932; Brooklyn, New York
- Education: University of Pennsylvania, University of Michigan (Ph.D. in English, 1963)
- Occupations: professor editor publisher writer
- Employer(s): University of Michigan; Hunter College; Crown Publishers; The Lyons Press
- Known for: The Lyons Press
- Notable work: Full Creel: A Nick Lyons Reader; Spring Creek; The Seasonable Angler
- Relatives: Mari Blumeau Lyons (wife); Tony Lyons (son)

Nick Lyons (born 1932) is a fly-fisherman and angler. In addition to fishing, Lyons was an English professor and an accomplished writer. He mostly stuck to books in the fly fishing genre. Lyons founded The Lyons Press, a publishing agency based in Essex, Connecticut. He is now retired and resides on the east coast.

== Early life ==
Nick Lyons was born in Brooklyn, New York in 1932. He began fishing at the age of 3 at his grandfather's hotel, the Laurel House, in the Catskill Mountains. He would also fish in a small pond at the private boarding school he attended.

== Education and academic career ==
Lyons graduated from the Wharton School at the University of Pennsylvania, after which he served in the United States Army. At the age of 21, he began fly fishing, a passion that would last for the rest of his life. In 1963, he earned a doctorate in English from the University of Michigan.

Following his graduation from the University of Michigan, Lyons began working at the University of Michigan as an English professor. He then accepted a position at Hunter College of the City University of New York (CUNY) as an English literature professor in 1961. At the same time, he worked as an editor at Crown Publishers. He worked at CUNY from 1961 to 1988 and served as the executive editor of Crown Publishers from 1964 to 1974.

== Publishing and writing career ==
Lyons wrote from the age of 26 to 36, when he was first published in Field & Stream magazine. He continued a successful writing career, composing many articles for a variety of publications and eleven books over the course of his time as a writer. In particular, he wrote a last-page column called the “Seasonable Angler” for Fly Fisherman magazine for over twenty years. "Writing about fishing promptly multiplied the pleasure I'd always taken from fishing."-Nick Lyons.

In 1977, Lyons acquired the rights to Art Flick's Streamside Guide, which inspired him to eventually create his first publishing company as a subsidiary of Benn Brothers, Ltd. In 1984, he bought out the subsidiary rights, and Nick Lyons Books became an independent incorporated company called Nick Lyons Books, Inc. The company initially focused on publishing books on fly fishing, but the list eventually expanded to include works on natural history, adventure, and a wide variety of outdoor activities. In 1981, Nick Lyons partnered with Peter Burford, and the publishing house became Lyons & Burford, Publishers. Lyons served as the president of the company for several years. In 1997, Peter Burford left the company, and its name changed again to the Lyons Press. In 1997, Lyons’ son Tony took over the company as the president and publisher. Nick remained as the chairman of the board. In 2001, Globe Pequot Press of Guilford, Connecticut acquired Lyons Press.Lyons Publishing added roughly 150 books to the fly fishing genre. Lyons revived old books that had not sold well at first. An example is Streamside Guide to Naturals and Imitations, by Art Flick. The pocket-sized book sold roughly 7,500 copies when it came out in 1947. Since Lyons revived it, the guide has become one of the bibles of fly fishing, with hundreds of thousands of copies sold. His last book, entitled Full Creel: A Nick Lyons Reader, was published in 2000 by Atlantic Monthly Press. "Nobody in the American history of fly fishing has had as positive an influence on the literature of fly fishing as he has," said Paul Schullery, author of American Fly Fishing: A History.

== Personal life ==
In 1957, Lyons married artist Mari Blumenau (1935-2016). The two had four children: Paul (1958 - 2018), Charles, Jennifer, and Anthony (nicknamed Tony). Mari, who died in 2016, illustrated many of her husband's books and was a prolific artist.

== Later years ==
Lyons spends his time between New York and Manhattan. His last book was "Full Creel: A Nick Lyons Reader", which was published in 2000 by Atlantic Monthly Press. He no longer writes, but is still an avid fly fisherman. Lyons also wrote an autobiographical book called "Fire in the Straw" in 2020. He has had nothing published since.

== Publications ==
- Lyons, Nick. The Sony Vision. New York: Crown Publishers, 1976.
- Lyons, Nick. Confessions of a Fly Fishing Addict. New York: Simon & Schuster, 1989.
- Lyons, Nick. Bright Rivers. Philadelphia: J. B. Lippincott, 1977.
- Lyons, Nick. The Seasonable Angler. New York: Atlantic Monthly Press, 1999.
- Lyons, Nick. My Secret Fishing Life. New York: Atlantic Monthly Press, 1999.
- Lyons, Nick. A Flyfisher's World. New York: Atlantic Monthly Press, 1996.
- Lyons, Nick. Spring Creek. New York, NY: Atlantic Monthly Press, 1992.
- Lyons, Nick. 'Fire in the Straw: A Memoir.' New York, NY: Arcade Publishing, 2020.
