= The Real Anthony Fauci =

2021 book by Robert F. Kennedy Jr.

The Real Anthony Fauci: Bill Gates, Big Pharma, and the Global War on Democracy and Public Health
- Author: Robert F. Kennedy Jr.
- Language: English
- Subjects: Anthony Fauci, HIV/AIDS in the United States, COVID-19 pandemic in the United States
- Publisher: Skyhorse Publishing
- Publication date: November 16, 2021
- Pages: 480
- ISBN: 978-1510766808

The Real Anthony Fauci: Bill Gates, Big Pharma, and the Global War on Democracy and Public Health is a 2021 book by Robert F. Kennedy Jr. in which he denounces Anthony Fauci and his leadership of the National Institute of Allergy and Infectious Diseases. In the book, Kennedy promotes HIV/AIDS denialism and misinformation about Fauci's role during the HIV epidemic and the COVID-19 pandemic in the United States. The book was described as "controversial" by The Guardian and Publishers Weekly and a "conspiracy theory extravaganza" by Science-Based Medicine.

In response, Fauci called the book "unfortunate" and characterized Kennedy as "a very disturbed individual". Of a meeting he had with Kennedy to discuss vaccines early in Fauci's tenure with the first Trump administration, he would later recall "I don't know what’s going on in his [Kennedy's] head, but it’s not good.”

The book became a New York Times best seller, selling over one million copies.

== Publication ==
The Real Anthony Fauci is a 480-page book written by anti-vaccination conspiracy theorist Robert F. Kennedy Jr. The book was published by Skyhorse Publishing on November 16, 2021. It includes dustjacket blurbs by Tucker Carlson, Naomi Wolf, Oliver Stone, and Alan Dershowitz.

== Synopsis ==
The book accuses American public health leader Anthony Fauci of 30 years of abuse of power, during both the HIV epidemic and the COVID-19 pandemic.

In the book, Kennedy accuses Fauci of pulling off "a historic coup d’état against Western democracy" and promotes unproven COVID-19 treatments, including hydroxychloroquine and ivermectin. The author shares his opinion that COVID-19 vaccines are not sufficiently safety tested, and likens vaccine mandates in the United States to living under the rule of Nazi Germany.

The book accuses Fauci of deliberately neglecting to use hydroxychloroquine in order to increase the number of people who would die from COVID-19. Studies show the drug is ineffective against COVID-19. The World Health Organization recommends it not be used for treating or for preventing COVID.

Kennedy also attacks the science of AIDS, spending over a hundred pages quoting HIV denialists such as Peter Duesberg who question the role of HIV in the etiology of AIDS. Kennedy refers to the "orthodoxy that HIV alone causes AIDS", and the "theology that HIV is the sole cause of AIDS", as well as repeating the HIV/AIDS denialist claim that no one has isolated the HIV particle and "No one has been able to point to a study that demonstrates their hypothesis using accepted scientific proofs". The scientific consensus is that the evidence showing HIV to be the cause of AIDS is conclusive.

== Critical reception ==
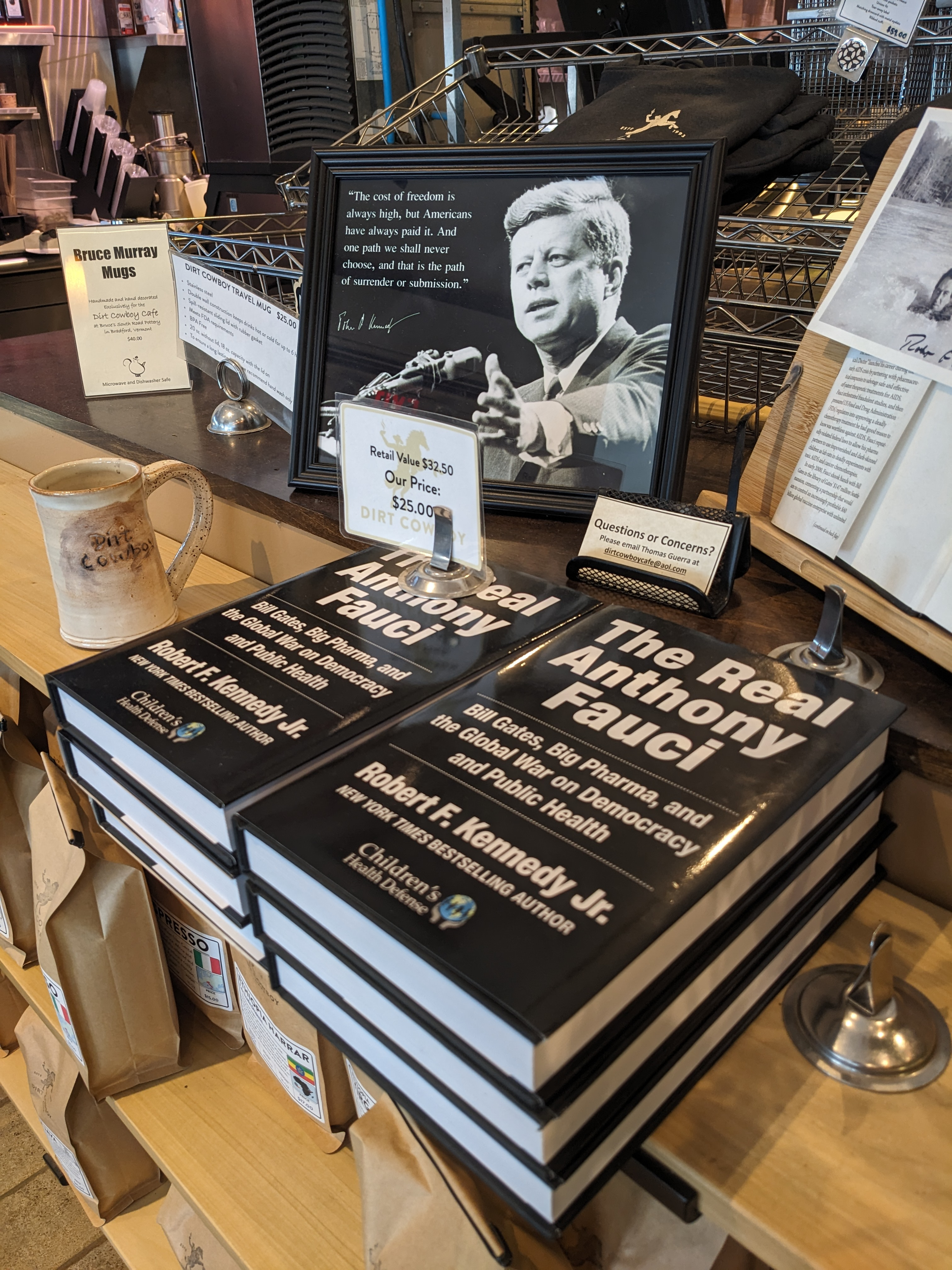
Copies of the book for sale in 2023

The book has sold over one million copies and remained a New York Times best seller for seventeen weeks.

Noting Kennedy's concern about the safety of vaccines, the Associated Press pointed out the Food and Drug Administration's three phases of testing. FactCheck.org says "One of Kennedy’s most common and pernicious false claims is that vaccines are not tested for safety in clinical trials," a claim it calls "overtly false."

Both The Guardian and Publishers Weekly described the book as controversial. Newsweek described the book as "inflammatory". Democratic party State Senator Will Brownsberger described the book as promoting a conspiracy. Medical doctor Theodore Dalrymple accused Kennedy of paranoia, and criticized his writing for containing contradictions, absurdity, falsehoods, needless exaggerations, and seeing "conspiracy everywhere" while lacking objectivity. Dalrymple's fact checking of five scientific papers cited in the book led him to conclude that Kennedy had interpreted each of them incorrectly and therefore misled readers.

Molecular biologist and science communicator Dan Wilson devoted seven episodes of his Debunk the Funk video series to refuting claims in the book. Wilson says that Kennedy "goes full HIV/AIDS denial" and makes "disgusting, hateful, and wrong claims".

Infectious disease specialist Michael Osterholm says that Kennedy's anti-vaccine disinformation is effective "because it's portrayed to the public with graphs and figures and what appears to be scientific data. He has perfected the art of illusion of fact." Osterholm also adds "this is about people's lives. And the consequences of promoting this kind of disinformation, as credible as it may seem, is simply dangerous."

== Film ==
In 2022, Kala Mandrake directed the 111-minute film The Real Anthony Fauci. The Radio Times categorized the film as "crime/detective | fantasy". The film features Kennedy.

== See also ==
- A Letter to Liberals
- Children's Health Defense
- COVID-19 misinformation by the United States
- List of unproven methods against COVID-19
- Robert F. Kennedy Jr. 2024 presidential campaign
