= Skyhorse Publishing =

American book publishing company

- Founded: 2006; 20 years ago
- Founder: Tony Lyons
- Country of origin: United States
- Headquarters location: New York City
- Distribution: Simon & Schuster (United States & worldwide – except South Africa)
- Key people: Tony Lyons (President and Publisher)
- Publication types: Books
- Imprints: Allworth Press, Arcade CrimeWise, Arcade, Sky Pony, Sports Publishing, Carrel Books, Talos Press, Night Shade Books, Good Books, Helios, Not For Tourists, Hot Books, Racehorse Publishing, Clydesdale Press, Seahorse Press, Racehorse For Young Readers, Peakpoint Press
- No. of employees: 56 (as of October 2018)
- Official website: skyhorsepublishing.com

Skyhorse Publishing, Inc. is an American independent book publishing company founded in 2006 and headquartered in New York City, with a satellite office in Brattleboro, Vermont.

== History ==
The current president and publisher is founder Tony Lyons, former president and publisher of Lyons Press until 2004. As noted by Publishers Weekly, "Skyhorse's list will have some similarities to the old Lyons Press, with books on sports, flyfishing, nature and history a central part of Skyhorse's publishing program. The list includes narrative nonfiction, military history, gambling and business titles. In addition, [Tony] Lyons intends to bring back 'forgotten classics'."

== Growth and expansion ==
In 2010, Skyhorse acquired Arcade Publishing with its portfolio of 500 titles, as well as another 300 titles through the acquisition of Allworth Press. Skyhorse also announced the 2011 acquisition of Sports Publishing with its 800 titles, and the launch of a children's and young adult imprint called Sky Pony Press. By 2011, Skyhorse grew "from one imprint to five, and from eight employees to more than 40". The company "entered a three-year, 30-book licensing agreement with Norstedts of Sweden to acquire world English rights to a range of titles on crafts, health, fitness and cooking." In 2011, Publishers Weekly listed Skyhorse Publishing as one of the fastest-growing independent presses.

Skyhorse added 250 new titles to its catalog with its acquisition of science-fiction and fantasy publisher Night Shade Books in 2013. Also, that year Skyhorse announced the launch of the new imprint, Carrel Books, catering to the library market with books on medicine/health, history, biography/memoir, business/careers, among others. In 2014, Skyhorse partnered with Perseus Books Group to acquire the assets of Good Books. While Perseus retained the Mayo Clinic line of health books from the Good Books catalog, Skyhorse obtained all other books assets, including the New York Times Bestselling Fix-It and Forget-It series. Another Skyhorse imprint, Talos Press published its first book in 2014. In partnership with the literary agency, International Transactions, Skyhorse launched the new imprint, Yucca Publishing.

In May 2015, partnering with David Talbot, founder and former editor-in-chief of Salon, Skyhorse launched the investigative book imprint Hot Books. Hot Books' first title, released September 2015, was The Beastside: Living (and Dying) While Black in America, written by D. Watkins. In an interview by Fresh Air host Terry Gross on NPR, Watkins recounts harrowing stories of growing up in East Baltimore.

Skyhorse started a new division in 2016 called Racehorse Publishing, which publishes a range of categories, including promotional titles, instant books, and classic works of literature. The promotional line is operated under the new Clydesdale Press imprint. Another new imprint, Seahorse Press, publishes books on boating, sailing and sea adventures. Skyhorse launched the new imprint Arcade CrimeWise to publish crime fiction, mysteries, noir, thrillers, and spy novels.

To manage the close to 1,000 titles that it stood to publish in 2016, Skyhorse increased staff from 56 to 81 in 2015.

Skyhorse Publishing had revenue of more than $43 million in 2015 and a backlist of 6,000 titles. With 93 people then on staff, the company planned to release 900 books in 2017 through its 18 imprints. Practical books for sports lovers, gardeners, cooks and gamers, etc., sold more than 3 million copies in total during 2015. Adult coloring books, first introduced in May 2015, have sold over 4,000,000 copies.

In June 2017, a group of Skyhorse employees announced intentions to hold a union election in order to join United Auto Workers Local 2110. According to a National Labor Relations Board count, staffers fell short of the votes needed on November 30, 2018, with 18 voting for, 28 voting against, and an additional 23 votes submitted but counted as ineligible ballots.

In April 2018, Skyhorse announced "a major reorganization" with job cuts of 16 full-time positions and plans "to reduce new titles published by 'approximately 25 percent' in 2018" compared to 2017, when it released 1,120 titles. Publisher Tony Lyons announced the decision in response to a decline in net sales by 19% in 2017, and issues related to paper shortages and book distribution.

Skyhorse and Simon & Schuster released the news in July 2018 that Simon & Schuster will distribute Skyhorse titles in the U.S. and most markets and territories around the world beginning on January 1, 2019.

In 2023, Skyhorse acquired Regnery Publishing with its 1,548 titles, making Regnery a Skyhorse imprint. Skyhorse acquired All Seasons Press in 2024, adding it as a new imprint and its list of titles to the Skyhorse portfolio.

== Bestselling books and notable authors ==
In 2008, Skyhorse published the erotic travelogue Around the World in 80 Lays, by Joe Diamond, writer for Playboy TV's travel series Sexy Things to Do Before You Die. Skyhorses's 41st bestseller Defeating ISIS: Who They Are, How They Fight, What They Believe by Malcolm Nance, debuts as #9 on the New York Times e-book bestseller list, July 3, 2016.

The Case Against Impeaching Trump by Alan Dershowitz became a New York Times bestseller on July 29, 2018. Published through Skyhorse's Hot Books imprint, "Mr. Dershowitz said he wanted to offer a counterpoint to the raft of books arguing for the validity of impeachment."

On March 23, 2020, Skyhorse Publishing announced that it had acquired and released the memoir Apropos of Nothing by Woody Allen through its Arcade imprint. The book, originally set for an April 7 release by Hachette Book Group, was cancelled after Hachette employees staged a walkout in protest. Apropos of Nothing was listed on the April 26, 2020 New York Times Best Seller list for Hardcover Nonfiction. On September 8, 2020, Skyhorse published Disloyal: A Memoir: The True Story of the Former Personal Attorney to President Donald J. Trump by Michael Cohen, which became a #1 New York Times bestseller.

The book, The Walk by Philippe Petit, about his walk between New York's World Trade Center towers, released by Skyhorse on July 21, 2015, based on a major motion picture also titled The Walk directed by Robert Zemeckis and released on September 30, 2015. On September 16, 2016, Skyhorse released the official motion picture tie-in book Snowden, timed to the release of the Oliver Stone film by the same name. The book Last Flag Flying, by Darryl Ponicsan, published by Skyhorse on September 5, 2017, has been made into a feature film.

Sky Pony, the children's book imprint of Skyhorse, publishes a line of unofficial Hacks for Minecrafters books, and a series of original, unofficial novels. Along with Scholastic, the official licensing publisher of Minecraft books in the U.S., the two houses publish the majority of Minecraft titles for kids.

On May 17, 2021, Skyhorse announced that it would release Blake Bailey's biography of Philip Roth, Philip Roth: The Biography. The book was originally published by W. W. Norton & Company, which withdrew it after allegations of sexual misconduct were made against Bailey.

On November 16, 2021, Skyhorse published the bestseller The Real Anthony Fauci: Bill Gates, Big Pharma, and the Global War on Democracy and Public Health by Robert F. Kennedy Jr.

Skyhorse added to its New York Times bestselling list of books by publishing Vax-Unvax: Let the Science Speak by Robert F. Kennedy Jr. and Brian Hooker on August 29, 2023. and Unhumans: The Secret History of Communist Revolutions (and How to Crush Them) by Jack Posobiec and Joshua Lisec, on July 9, 2024. On October 8, 2024, Skyhorse published Melania, a memoir by Melania Trump, which became a #1 New York Times bestseller.

Skyhorse has published thirty-five titles about the assassination of John F. Kennedy, including many promoting conspiracy theories. The company was reported to have invested $1 million on acquisition, printing and marketing for the publication of eight new books on the subject in 2013; as well as $300,000 to $400,000 on the reprints of seventeen others. Authors on the subject published or re-published by Skyhorse include Richard Belzer, Gaeton Fonzi, Jim Garrison Mark Lane, Peter Dale Scott, Roger Stone, Jesse Ventura, and Harold Weisberg.

== Criticism ==
In 2020, Vanity Fair printed an article criticizing Skyhorse Publishing for being a toxic workplace, and for printing books containing conspiracy theories. Also in 2020, the Los Angeles Times described it as "almost comically agnostic on the truth".

In March 2022, The Guardian called Skyhorse publisher Tony Lyons "the US publisher who picks up books 'cancelled' by other presses". In response, Lyons said, "Maybe the role of publishers is to bring people closer. To encourage them to read things they disagree with, that make them angry, but ultimately to learn things that help them bridge the gap to what they thought they hated but may find some nuance in."

In June 2022, Simon & Schuster announced it would be distributing Skyhorse's forthcoming publication of the House Select Committee's report on the attack on the U.S. Capitol on January 6, 2021. The book would contain an introduction by Darren Beattie, a former Trump speechwriter and conspiracy theorist who has referred to the Committee's investigation as a "witch hunt."

In 2023, the Associated Press reported that Skyhorse had a deal to publish books by the vaccine misinformation organisation Children's Health Defense, run by Robert F. Kennedy Jr.
