= Food Allergy Initiative =

American food allergy research organization

Agency overview
- Formed: 1998
- Headquarters: New York, NY

The Food Allergy Initiative (FAI) was a 501(c)(3) non-profit organization founded in 1998 with the mission to fund food allergy research that seeks a cure, to improve diagnosis and treatment, and to keep patients safe through advocacy and education. It was the largest private source of funding for food allergy research in the United States. As of 2011, the organization had raised more than $72 million towards these goals. In 2012, FAI and the Food Allergy & Anaphylaxis Network merged to form Food Allergy Research & Education (FARE).

== Research ==
While working within the guidelines set forth by the National Institutes of Health in the Report of the NIH Expert Panel on Food Allergy Research, FAI worked to increase:

- The number of researchers and research projects that focus on food allergy
- The number of institutions with food allergy clinical programs
- The number of fellows and physicians trained to treat food-allergic patients
- The amount of government funding allocated to food allergy research

FAI sponsored food allergy research across the United States at institutions such as Harvard Medical School, the Northwestern University Feinberg School of Medicine, and Mount Sinai School of Medicine of New York University.

== Activities ==
FAI played a key role in passing the Food Allergen Labeling and Consumer Protection Act of 2004.

== See also ==
- Food allergy
