= Robert F. Kennedy Jr. =

American politician (born 1954)

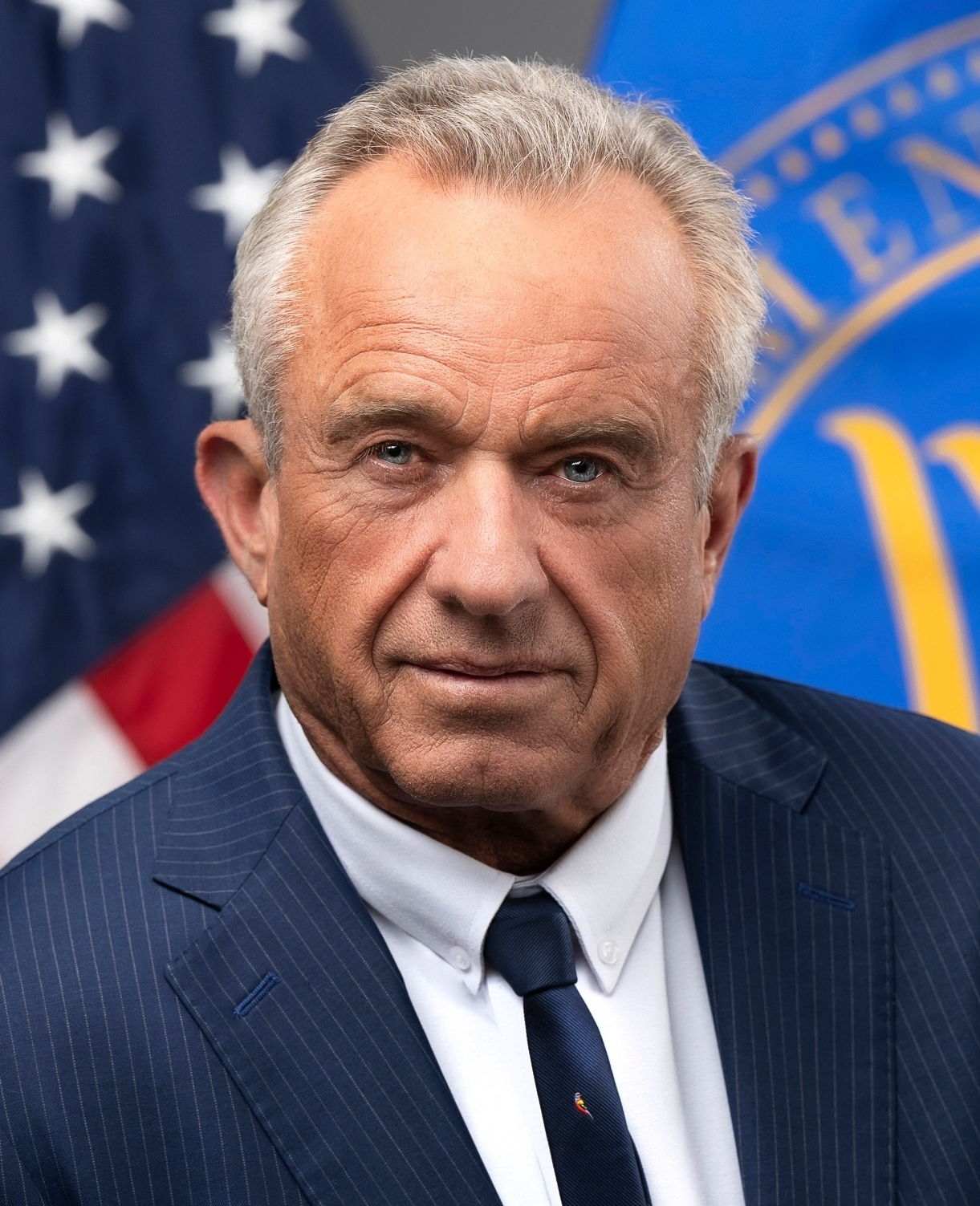
- Official portrait, 2025

26th United States Secretary of Health and Human Services
- Incumbent
- Assumed office February 13, 2025
- President: Donald Trump
- Deputy: Jim O'Neill
- Preceded by: Xavier Becerra

Personal details
- Born: Robert Francis Kennedy Jr. January 17, 1954 (age 72) Washington, D.C., U.S.
- Party: Independent (since 2023)
- Other political affiliations: Democratic (before 2023)
- Spouses: Emily Black (m. 1982; div. 1994); Mary Richardson (m. 1994; died 2012); Cheryl Hines (m. 2014)
- Children: 6, including Robert III
- Parents: Robert F. Kennedy; Ethel Skakel
- Relatives: Kennedy family
- Education: Harvard University (BA); London School of Economics (attended); University of Virginia (JD); Pace University (LLM)
- Kennedy's voice Kennedy's opening statement during his first confirmation hearing for Secretary of Health and Human Services; Recorded January 29, 2025

Robert Francis Kennedy Jr. (born January 17, 1954), also known by his initials RFK Jr., is an American politician, environmental lawyer, author, conspiracy theorist, and anti-vaccine activist serving as the 26th United States secretary of health and human services since 2025. A member of the prominent Kennedy family, he is a son of Senator and US attorney general Robert F. Kennedy and a nephew of US president John F. Kennedy and US senator Ted Kennedy.

Kennedy began his career as an assistant district attorney in Manhattan. In the mid-1980s, he joined two nonprofits focused on environmental protection: Riverkeeper and the Natural Resources Defense Council (NRDC). In 1986, he became an adjunct professor of environmental law at Pace University School of Law, and in 1987 he founded Pace's Environmental Litigation Clinic. In 1999, Kennedy founded the nonprofit environmental group Waterkeeper Alliance. He first ran as a member of the Democratic Party and later started an independent campaign in the 2024 presidential election, before withdrawing from the race and endorsing the Republican Party's nominee, Donald Trump.

Since 2005, Kennedy has promoted vaccine misinformation and public-health conspiracy theories, including the chemtrail conspiracy theory, HIV/AIDS denialism, and the scientifically disproved claim of a causal link between vaccines and autism. He has drawn criticism for fueling vaccine hesitancy amid a social climate that gave rise to the deadly measles outbreaks in Samoa and Tonga. Kennedy has said that all his children were vaccinated and, during the 2025 measles outbreak, publicly encouraged people to get the measles vaccine. Kennedy is the founder and former chairman of Children's Health Defense, an anti-vaccine advocacy group and proponent of COVID-19 vaccine misinformation. He has written books including The Riverkeepers (1997), Crimes Against Nature (2004), The Real Anthony Fauci (2021), and A Letter to Liberals (2022).

In November 2024, President-elect Trump nominated Kennedy for secretary of health and human services (HHS). In February 2025, the Senate confirmed Kennedy by a vote of 52 to 48, and he was sworn in shortly thereafter amid strong opposition from scientists and medical groups. His tenure has been marked by controversial actions on vaccines, public health policy, and agency leadership that have drawn significant legal, scientific, and political criticism.

== Early life and education ==
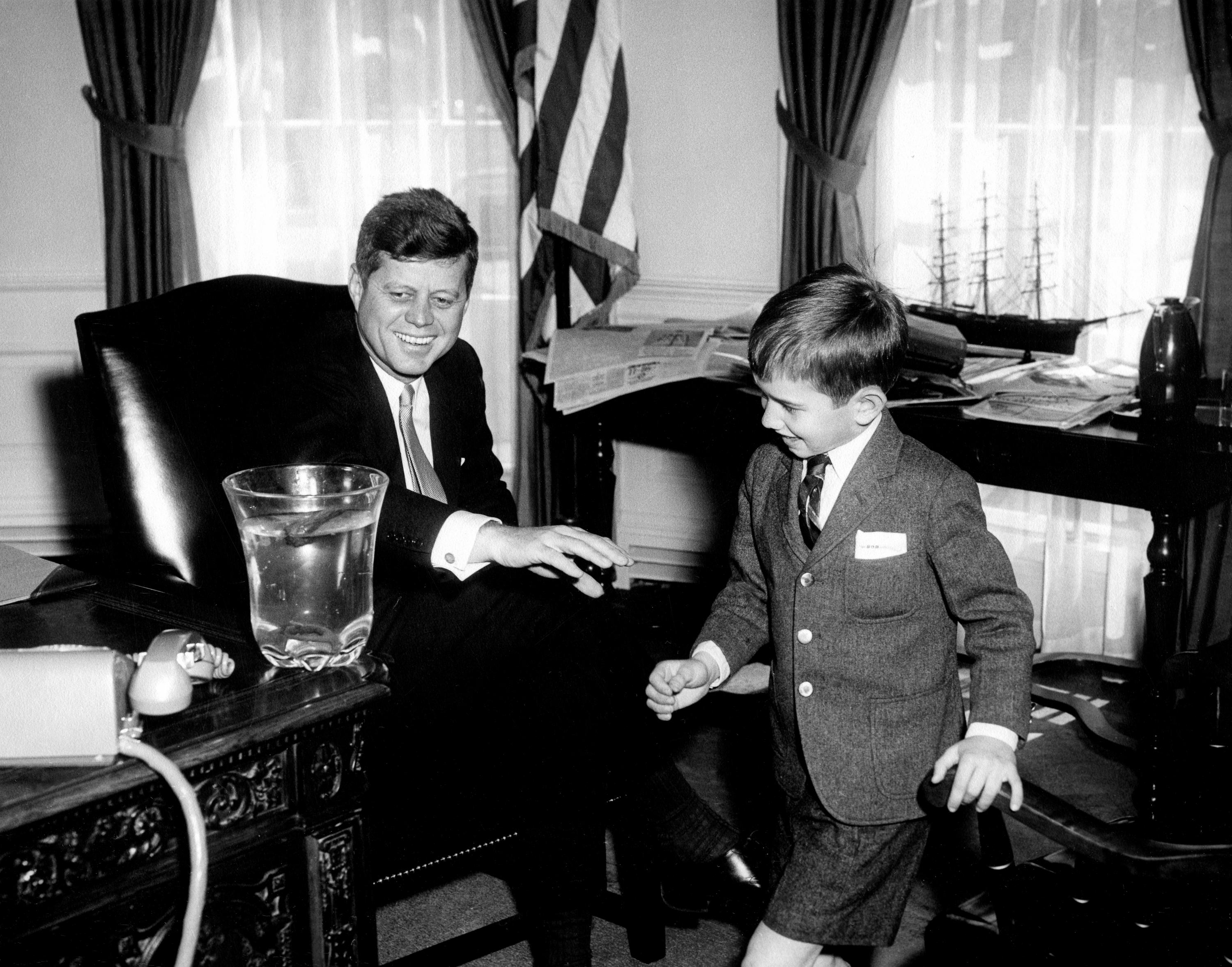
Seven-year old Kennedy with his uncle, President John F. Kennedy, in the Oval Office in 1961

Robert Francis Kennedy Jr. was born at Georgetown University Hospital in Washington, D.C., on January 17, 1954. He is the third of eleven children of senator and US attorney general Robert F. Kennedy and Ethel Skakel. He is a nephew of President John F. Kennedy and Senator Ted Kennedy.

Kennedy was raised at the Kennedy Compound in Hyannis Port, Massachusetts, and at Hickory Hill, the family estate in McLean, Virginia. In June 1972, he graduated from the Palfrey Street School, a day school in Watertown, Massachusetts. While attending Palfrey, he lived with a surrogate family at a farmhouse in Cambridge, Massachusetts. Kennedy continued his education at Harvard University, graduating in 1976 with a Bachelor of Arts in American history and literature. With his former roommate Peter W. Kaplan, he did thesis research in Alabama. He earned a Juris Doctor degree from the University of Virginia School of Law in 1982 and a Master of Laws from Pace University in 1987.

He was nine years old when John F. Kennedy was assassinated in 1963, and 14 when his father was assassinated while running for president in 1968. Kennedy learned of his father's shooting while at Georgetown Preparatory School. A few hours later, he flew to Los Angeles on Vice President Hubert Humphrey's plane, along with his older siblings, Kathleen and Joseph. He was with his father when he died. Kennedy was a pallbearer at his father's funeral, where he spoke and read excerpts from his father's speeches at the mass commemorating his death at Arlington National Cemetery.

After his father's death, Kennedy struggled with drug abuse, which led to his arrest in Barnstable, Massachusetts, for cannabis possession at age 16, and his expulsion from two boarding schools: Millbrook and Pomfret. During this time, some in the Kennedy family regarded him as the "ringleader" of a pack of spoiled, rich kids who called themselves the "Hyannis Port Terrors", engaging in vandalism, theft, and drug use. His first cousin Caroline Kennedy later blamed Kennedy for leading other members of their family "down the path of drug addiction", calling him a "predator". At Harvard, Kennedy continued to use heroin and cocaine, often with his brother David, earning a reputation that has been described as a "pied piper" and "drug dealer".

In 1972, Kennedy and Roger Ailes made a film about wildlife and conservation in Kenya. Kennedy's book on Frank Minis Johnson, a federal judge who led racial desegregation in Alabama, was published in 1978.

== Career ==
=== Manhattan DA's office ===
In 1982, Kennedy was sworn in as an assistant district attorney for Manhattan. After failing the New York bar exam, he resigned in July 1983.

=== Conviction for heroin possession ===
On September 16, 1983, Kennedy was arrested and charged with heroin possession in Rapid City, South Dakota, after he fell ill in an airplane bathroom. In February 1984, he pleaded guilty to a single felony charge of possession of heroin, and was sentenced to two years of probation and community service. After his arrest, he entered a drug treatment center. To satisfy conditions of his probation, Kennedy worked as a volunteer for the Natural Resources Defense Council (NRDC) and was required to attend regular drug rehabilitation sessions. Kennedy asserted that this ended his 14 years of heroin use, which he said had begun when he was 15. His probation ended a year early.

=== Riverkeeper ===
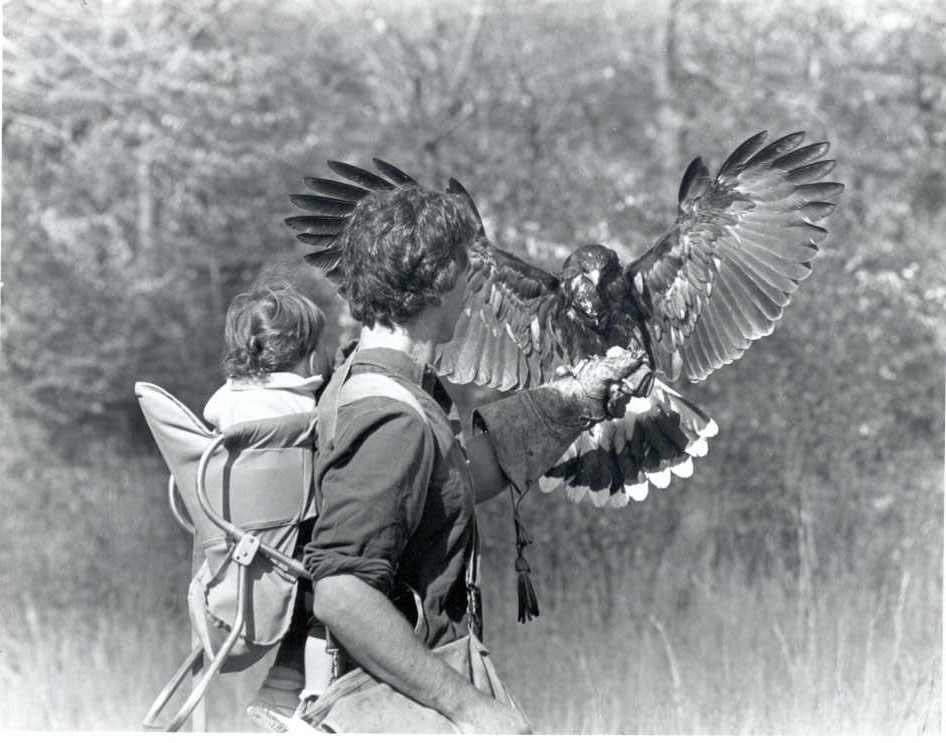
Kennedy with his daughter, Kick, holding a Harris's hawk in 1989

In 1984, Kennedy began volunteering at the Hudson River Fisherman's Association, renamed Riverkeeper in 1986 after a patrol boat it had built with settlement money from legal victories preceding Kennedy's arrival. After he was admitted to the New York bar in 1985, Riverkeeper hired him as senior attorney. Kennedy litigated and supervised environmental enforcement lawsuits on the east coast estuaries on behalf of Hudson Riverkeeper and the Long Island Soundkeeper, where he was also a board member. Long Island Soundkeeper sued several municipalities and cities along the Connecticut and New York coastlines. On the Hudson, Kennedy sued municipalities and industries, including General Electric, to stop discharging pollution and clean up legacy contamination. His work at Riverkeeper set long-term environmental legal standards.

In 1995, Kennedy advocated for repeal of legislation that he considered unfriendly to the environment. In 1997, he worked with John Cronin to write The Riverkeepers, a history of the early Riverkeepers and a primer for the Waterkeeper movement.

In 2000, a majority of Riverkeeper's board sided with Kennedy when he insisted on rehiring William Wegner, a wildlife lecturer and falcon trainer whom the organization's founder and president, Robert H. Boyle, had fired six months earlier after learning that Wegner had been convicted in 1995 for tax fraud, perjury, and conspiracy to violate wildlife protection laws. Wegner had recruited and led a team of at least 10 who smuggled cockatoo eggs, including species considered endangered by Australia, from Australia to the US over a period of eight years. He served 3.5 years of a five-year sentence and was hired by Kennedy a few months after his release. After the board's decision, Boyle, eight of the 22 members of the board, and Riverkeeper's treasurer resigned, saying it was not right for an environmental organization to hire someone convicted of environmental crimes and that it would hurt the organization's fundraising.

While working with Riverkeeper, Kennedy spearheaded a 34-year battle to close the Indian Point nuclear-power plant. Kennedy was featured in a 2004 documentary about the plant, Indian Point: Imagining the Unimaginable, directed by his sister, the documentary filmmaker Rory Kennedy. In 2017, Kennedy argued that the electricity Indian Point provided could be fully replaced by renewable energy. In 2022, after the plant's closure, carbon emissions from electricity generation in New York state increased by 37%, compared to 2019, before the start of the closure.

Kennedy resigned from Riverkeeper in 2017.

=== Pace Environmental Litigation Clinic ===
In 1987, Kennedy founded the Environmental Litigation Clinic at Pace University School of Law, where for three decades he was the clinic's supervising attorney and co-director and Clinical Professor of Law. Kennedy obtained a special order from the New York State Court of Appeals that permitted his 10 clinic students to practice law and try cases against Hudson River polluters in state and federal court, under the supervision of Kennedy and his co-director, Professor Karl Coplan. The clinic's full-time clients are Riverkeeper and Long Island Soundkeeper.

The clinic has sued governments and companies for polluting Long Island Sound and the Hudson River and its tributaries. It argued cases to expand citizen access to the shoreline and won hundreds of settlements for the Hudson Riverkeeper. Kennedy and his students also sued dozens of municipal wastewater treatment plants to force compliance with the Clean Water Act. In 2010, a Pace lawsuit forced ExxonMobil to clean up tens of millions of gallons of oil from legacy refinery spills in Newtown Creek in Brooklyn.

On April 11, 2001, Men's Journal gave Kennedy its "Heroes" Award for creating the Pace Environmental Litigation Clinic. Kennedy and the clinic received other awards for successful legal work cleaning up the environment. The Pace Clinic became a model for similar environmental law clinics throughout the country.

=== Waterkeeper Alliance ===
In June 1999, as Riverkeeper's success on the Hudson began inspiring the creation of Waterkeepers across North America, Kennedy and a few dozen Riverkeepers gathered in Southampton, Long Island, to found the Waterkeeper Alliance, which is now the umbrella group for the 344 licensed Waterkeeper programs in 44 countries. As president, Kennedy oversaw its legal, membership, policy and fundraising programs. The Alliance is dedicated to promoting "swimmable, fishable, drinkable waterways, worldwide".

Under Kennedy's leadership, Waterkeeper launched its "Clean Coal is a Deadly Lie" campaign in 2001, bringing dozens of lawsuits targeting mining practices, including mountaintop removal and slurry pond construction, as well as coal-burning utilities' mercury emissions and coal ash piles. Kennedy's Waterkeeper alliance has also been fighting coal export, including from terminals in the Pacific Northwest.

Waterkeeper waged a legal and public relations battle against pollution from factory farms. In the 1990s, Kennedy rallied opposition to factory farms among small independent farmers, convened a series of "National Summits" on factory meat products, and conducted press conference whistle-stop tours across North Carolina, Iowa, Kansas, Missouri, Illinois, Ohio, and in Washington, D.C. Beginning in 2000, Kennedy sued factory farms in North Carolina, Oklahoma, Maryland, and Iowa. In a 2003 article, he argued factory farms produce lower-quality, less healthy food, and harm independent family farmers by poisoning their air and water, reducing their property values, and using extensive state and federal subsidies to impose unfair competition against them.

Kennedy and his environmental work have been the focus of several films, including The Waterkeepers (2000), directed by Les Guthman. In 2008, he appeared in the IMAX documentary film Grand Canyon Adventure: River at Risk, riding the Grand Canyon in a wooden dory with his daughter Kick and anthropologist Wade Davis.

Kennedy resigned the Waterkeeper Alliance presidency in November 2020.

=== New York City Watershed Agreement ===
Beginning in 1991, Kennedy represented environmentalists and New York City watershed consumers in a series of lawsuits against New York City and upstate watershed polluters. Kennedy authored a series of articles and reports alleging that New York State was abdicating its responsibility to protect the water repository and supply. In 1996, he helped orchestrate the $1.2 billion New York City Watershed Agreement, which New York magazine recognized in its cover story, "The Kennedy Who Matters". This agreement, which Kennedy negotiated on behalf of environmentalists and New York City watershed consumers, is regarded as an international model in stakeholder consensus negotiations and sustainable development.

=== Kennedy & Madonna LLP ===
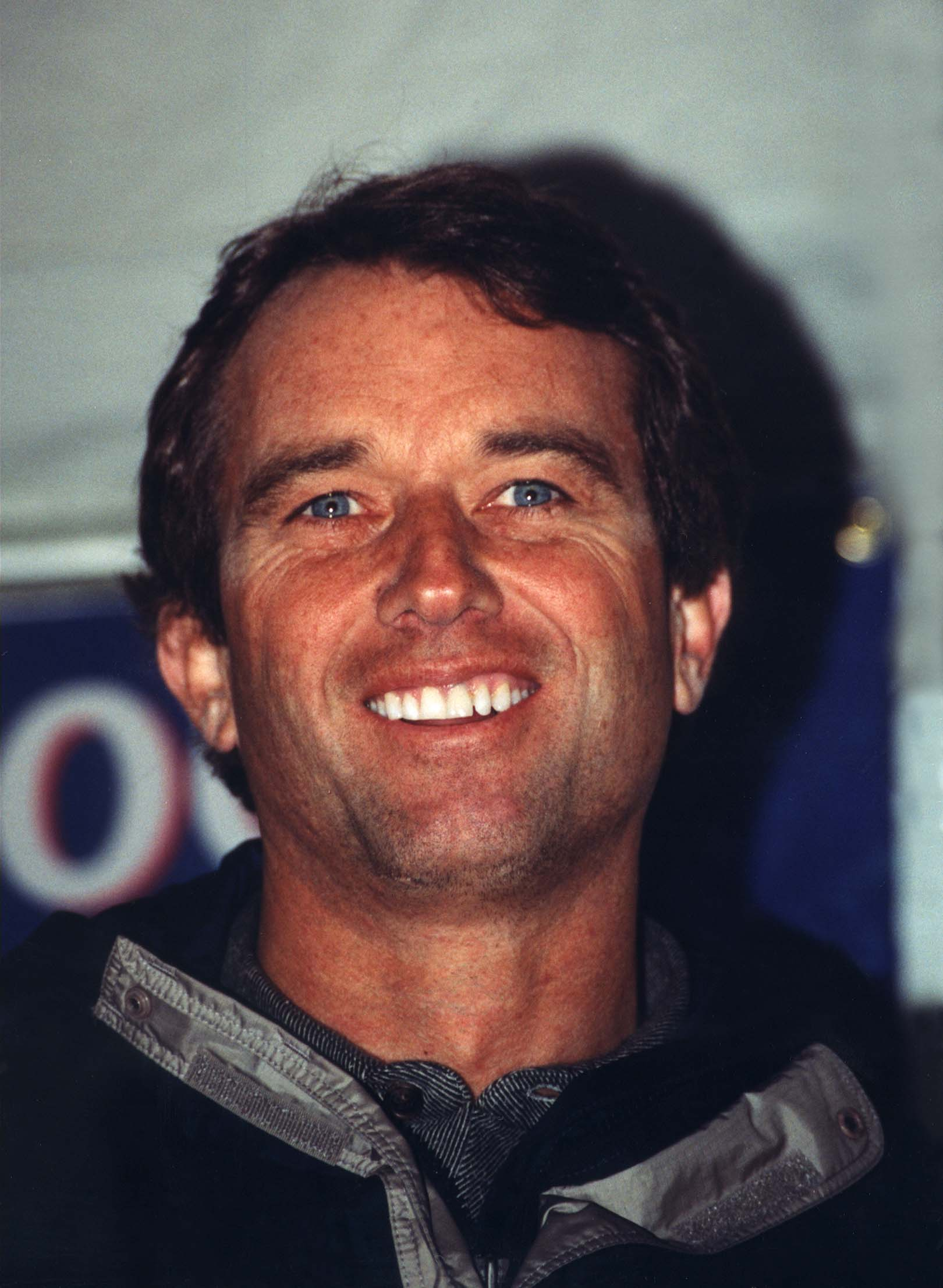
Kennedy in 2000

In 2000, Kennedy and the environmental lawyer Kevin Madonna founded the environmental law firm Kennedy & Madonna, LLP, to represent private plaintiffs against polluters. The firm litigates environmental contamination cases on behalf of individuals, non-profit organizations, school districts, public water suppliers, Indian tribes, municipalities and states. In 2001, Kennedy & Madonna organized a team of prestigious plaintiff law firms to challenge pollution from industrial pork and poultry production. In 2004, the firm was part of a legal team that secured a $70 million settlement for property owners in Pensacola, Florida whose properties were contaminated by chemicals from an adjacent Superfund site.

Kennedy & Madonna was profiled in the 2010 HBO documentary Mann v. Ford, which chronicles four years of litigation by the firm on behalf of the Ramapough Mountain Indians against the Ford Motor Company for dumping toxic waste on tribal lands in northern New Jersey. In addition to a monetary settlement for the tribe, the lawsuit contributed to the community's land being relisted on the federal Superfund list, the first time that a delisted site was relisted.

In 2007, Kennedy was one of three finalists nominated by Public Justice as "Trial Lawyer of the Year" for his role in the $396 million jury verdict against DuPont for contamination from its zinc plant in Spelter, West Virginia. In 2017, the firm was part of the trial team that secured a $670 million settlement on behalf of over 3,000 residents from Ohio and West Virginia whose drinking water was contaminated by the toxic chemical perfluorooctanoic acid, which DuPont released into the environment in Parkersburg, West Virginia.

=== Cape Wind ===
In 2005, Kennedy clashed with national environmental groups over his opposition to the Cape Wind Project, a proposed offshore wind farm in Cape Cod, Massachusetts (in Nantucket Sound). Taking the side of Cape Cod's commercial fishing industry, Kennedy argued that the project was a costly boondoggle. This position angered some environmentalists, and Kennedy was criticized by Rush Limbaugh and John Stossel. In The Wall Street Journal, Kennedy wrote, "Vermont wants to take its nuclear plant off line and replace it with clean, green power from Hydro-Québec—power available to Massachusetts utilities—at a cost of six cents per kilowatt hour (kwh). Cape Wind electricity, by a conservative estimate and based on figures they filed with the state, comes in at 25 cents per kwh."

=== Morgan & Morgan ===
In 2016, Kennedy became counsel to the Morgan & Morgan law firm. The partnership arose from the two firms' successful collaboration on the case against SoCalGas Company following the Aliso Canyon gas leak in California. In 2017, Kennedy and his partners sued Monsanto in federal court in San Francisco, on behalf of plaintiffs seeking to recover damages for non-Hodgkin's lymphoma cases that, the plaintiffs allege, were a result of exposure to Monsanto's glyphosate-based herbicide, Roundup. Kennedy and his team also filed a class action lawsuit against Monsanto for failing to warn consumers about the dangers allegedly posed by exposure to Roundup.

In September 2018, Kennedy and his partners filed a class-action lawsuit against Columbia Gas of Massachusetts alleging negligence following gas explosions in three towns north of Boston. Of Columbia Gas, Kennedy said, "as they build new miles of pipe, the same company is ignoring its existing infrastructure, which we now know is eroding and is dilapidated".

=== Other ventures ===
In 1999, Kennedy, Chris Bartle and John Hoving created a bottled water company, Keeper Springs, which donated all of its profits to Waterkeeper Alliance.

Kennedy was a venture partner and senior advisor at VantagePoint Capital Partners, one of the world's largest cleantech venture capital firms. Among other activities, VantagePoint was the original and largest pre-IPO institutional investor in Tesla, Inc. VantagePoint also backed BrightSource Energy and Solazyme, amongst others. Kennedy is a board member and counselor to several of Vantage Point's portfolio companies in the water and energy space, including Ostara, a Vancouver-based company that markets the technology to remove phosphorus and other excessive nutrients from wastewater, transforming otherwise pollution directly into high-grade fertilizer. He is also a senior advisor to Starwood Energy Group and has played a key role in a number of the firm's investments.

He is on the board of Vionx, a Massachusetts-based utility-scale vanadium flow battery systems manufacturer. On October 5, 2017, Vionx, National Grid and the US Department of Energy completed the installation of advanced flow batteries at Holy Name High School in the city of Worcester, Massachusetts. The collaboration also includes Siemens and the United Technologies Research Center and constitutes one of the largest energy storage facilities in Massachusetts.

Kennedy served on the board of the New York League of Conservation Voters.

Kennedy is a partner in ColorZen, which offers a turnkey-cotton-fiber pre-treatment solution that reduces water usage and toxic discharges in the cotton-dyeing process.

Kennedy was a co-owner and director of the smart-grid company Utility Integration Solutions (UISol), which was acquired by Alstom. He is presently a co-owner and director of GridBright, the market-leading grid management specialist.

In October 2011, Kennedy co-founded EcoWatch, an environmental news site. He resigned from its board of directors in 2018.

=== Minority and poor communities ===
In his first case as an environmental attorney, Kennedy represented the NAACP in a lawsuit against a proposal to build a garbage transfer station in a minority neighborhood in Ossining, New York. In 1987, he successfully sued Westchester County to reopen the Croton Point Park, which was primarily used by poor and minority communities from the Bronx. He then forced the reopening of the Pelham Bay Park, which New York City had closed to the public and converted to a police firing range.

=== International and indigenous rights ===
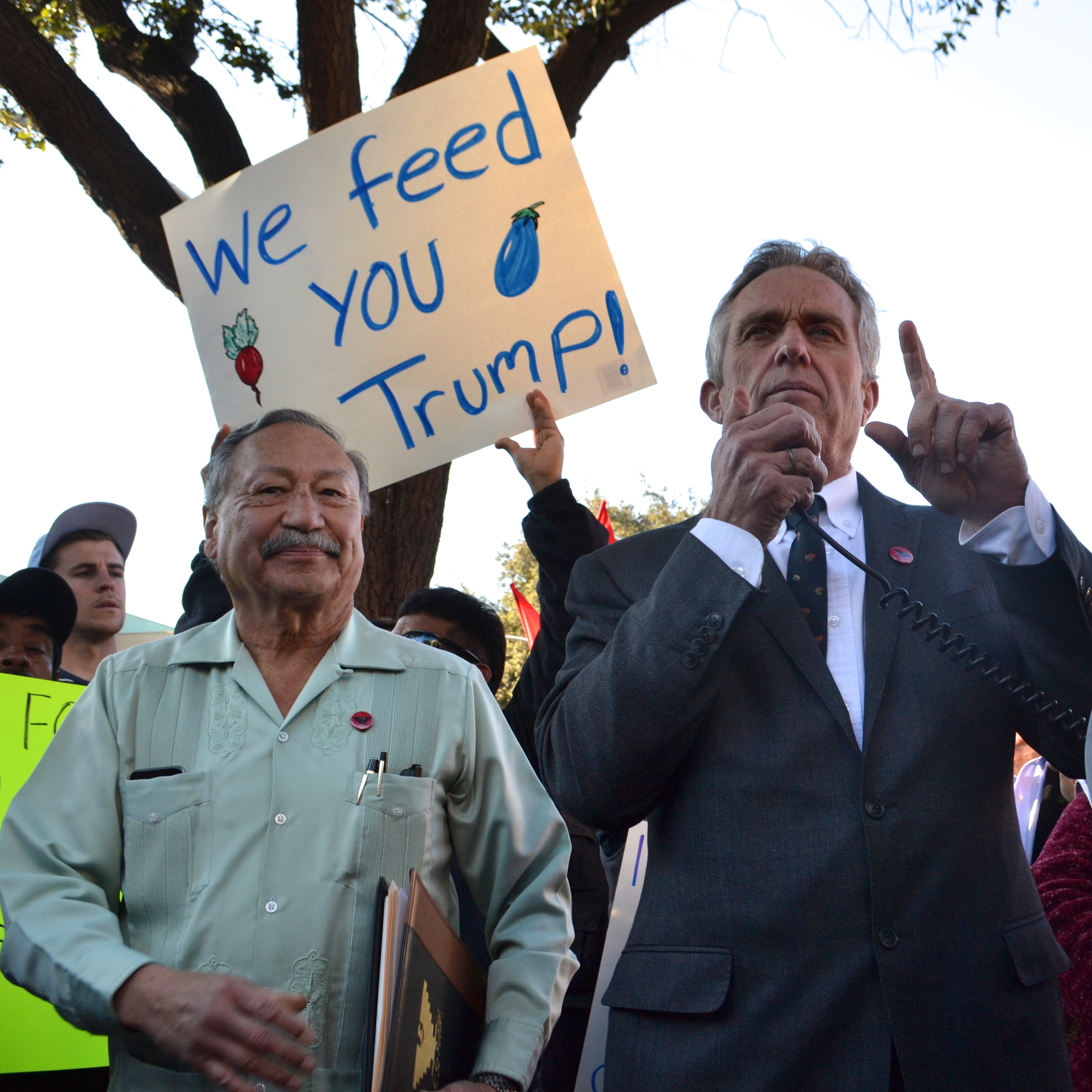
Kennedy at a United Farm Workers rally in 2017

Starting in 1985, Kennedy helped develop the international program for environmental, energy, and human rights of the Natural Resources Defense Council (NRDC), traveling to Canada and Latin America to assist indigenous tribes in protecting their homelands and opposing large-scale energy and extractive projects in remote wilderness areas.

In 1990, Kennedy assisted indigenous Pehuenches in Chile in a partially successful campaign to stop the construction of a series of dams on Chile's iconic Biobío River. That campaign derailed all but one of the proposed dams. Beginning in 1992, he assisted the Cree Indians of northern Quebec in their campaign against Hydro-Québec to halt construction of some 600 proposed dams on eleven rivers in James Bay.

In 1993, Kennedy and NRDC, working with the indigenous rights organization Cultural Survival, clashed with other American environmental groups in a dispute about the rights of Indians to govern their own lands in the Oriente region of Ecuador. Kennedy represented the CONFENIAE, a confederation of indigenous peoples, in negotiation with the American oil company Conoco to limit oil development in Ecuadorian Amazon and, at the same time, obtain benefits from resource extraction for Amazonian tribes. Kennedy was a vocal critic of Texaco for its previous record of polluting the Ecuadoran Amazon.

From 1993 to 1999, Kennedy worked with five Vancouver Island First Nations in their campaign to end industrial logging by MacMillan Bloedel in Clayoquot Sound, British Columbia. In 1996, he met with Cuban president Fidel Castro to persuade him to halt his plans to construct a nuclear power plant at Juraguá. During the meeting, Castro reminisced about Kennedy's father and uncle, speculating that US relations with Cuba would have been far better had President Kennedy not been assassinated.

Between 1996 and 2000, Kennedy and the NRDC helped Mexican commercial fishermen halt Mitsubishi's proposal to build a salt facility in the Laguna San Ignacio, an area in Baja where gray whales breed and nurse their calves. Kennedy wrote in opposition to the project, and took the campaign to Japan, meeting with Japanese Prime Minister Keizo Obuchi. In 2000, he assisted local environmental activists to stop Chaffin Light, a real estate developer, and US engineering giant Bechtel from building a large hotel and resort development that, Kennedy argued, threatened coral reefs and public beaches used by local Bahamians, at Clifton Bay, New Providence Island.

Kennedy was one of the early editors of Indian Country Today, North America's largest Native American newspaper. He helped lead the opposition to the damming of the Futaleufú River in the Southern Zone of Chile. In 2016, due to the pressure precipitated by the Futaleufú Riverkeepers campaign against the dams, the Spanish power company Endesa, which owned the right to dam the river, reversed its decision and relinquished all claims to the Futaleufú.

=== Military and Vieques ===
Kennedy has been a critic of environmental damage by the US military.

In a 2001 article, Kennedy described how he sued the US Navy on behalf of fishermen and residents of Vieques, an island of Puerto Rico, to stop weapons testing, bombing, and other military exercises. Kennedy argued that the activities were unnecessary, and that the Navy had illegally destroyed several endangered species, polluted the island's waters, harmed the residents' health, and damaged its economy. He was arrested for trespassing at Camp Garcia Vieques, the US Navy training facility, where he and others were protesting the use of a section of the island for training. Kennedy served 30 days in a maximum security prison in Puerto Rico.

The trespassing incident forced the suspension of live-fire exercises for almost three hours. The lawsuits and protests by Kennedy, and hundreds of Puerto Ricans who were also imprisoned, eventually forced the termination of naval bombing in Vieques by the Bush administration.

In a 2003 article for the Chicago Tribune, Kennedy called the US federal government "America's biggest polluter" and the US Department of Defense the worst offender. Citing the Environmental Protection Agency (EPA), he wrote, "unexploded ordnance waste can be found on 16,000 military ranges ... and more than half may contain biological or chemical weapons."

== Political aspirations ==
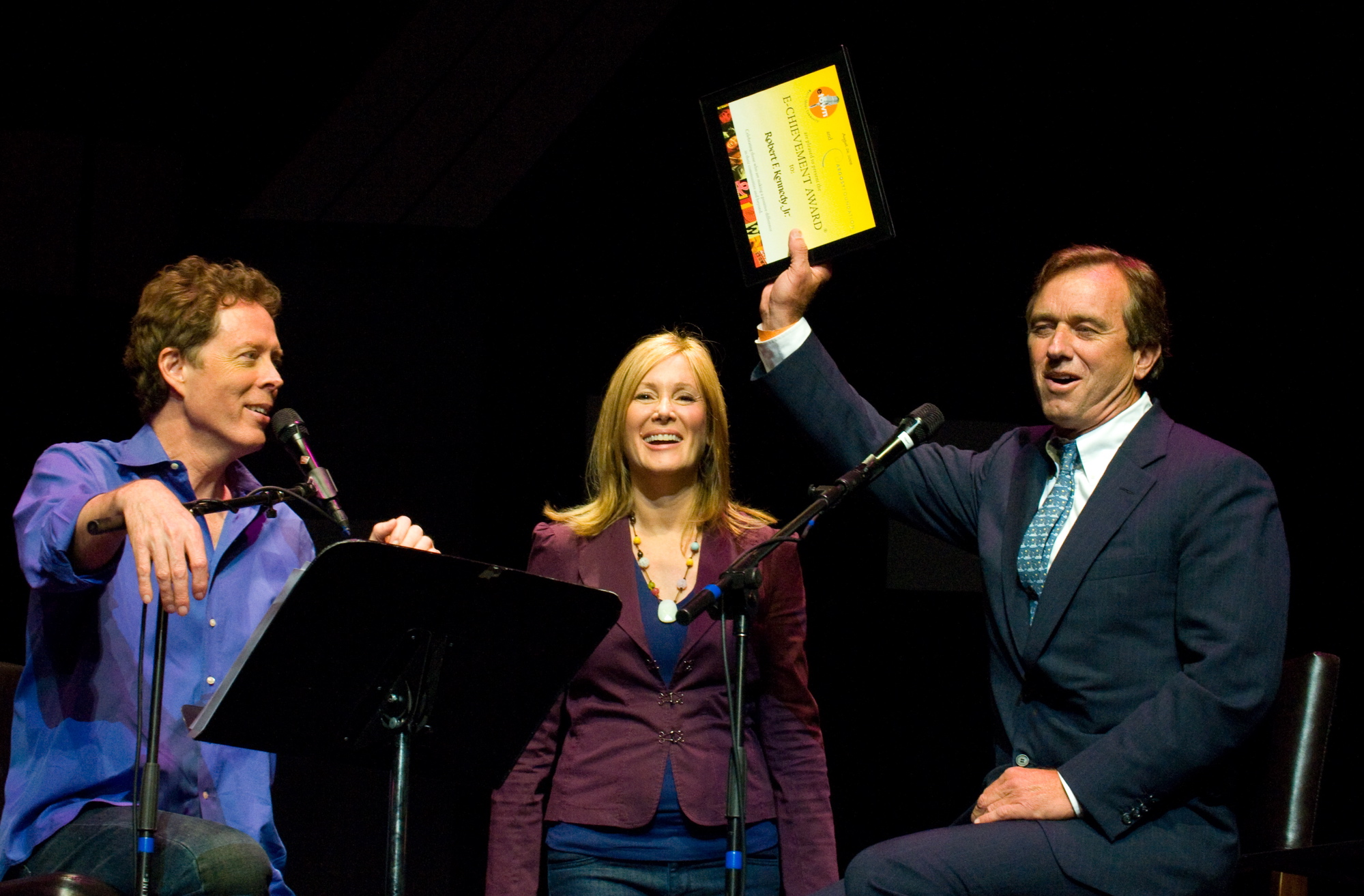
Kennedy at a taping of eTown during the 2008 Democratic National Convention

=== Candidacy aspirations ===
Kennedy considered running for political office in 2000 when Daniel Patrick Moynihan, a US senator from New York, did not seek reelection to the seat formerly held by Kennedy's father.

In 2005, Kennedy considered running for New York attorney general in the 2006 election, which would have put him up against his then-brother-in-law Andrew Cuomo, but he ultimately chose not to, despite being considered the front-runner.

On December 2, 2008, Kennedy said he did not want New York governor David Paterson to nominate him to the US Senate seat to be vacated by Hillary Clinton, Obama's nominee for Secretary of State. Some outlets indicated that Kennedy was a possible candidate for the position. He said that Senate service would leave him too little time with his family.

=== 2000s consideration for top environmental jobs ===
As a "well-respected climate lawyer" in the 2000s, Kennedy was "often linked to top environmental jobs in Democratic administrations", including in the 2000, 2004, and 2008 presidential elections. He was considered as a potential chair of the White House Council on Environmental Quality for Al Gore in 2000 and considered for the role of EPA administrator under John Kerry in 2004 and Barack Obama in 2008.

According to Politico, the Obama transition team decided not to nominate Kennedy due to his past heroin conviction and opposition from Senate Republicans. Then United States Chamber of Commerce lobbyist William Kovacs said that Kennedy's nomination "would speak volumes as to where Obama is going with his appointments ... A Kennedy appointment is as liberal as you can possibly get ... There is no one [candidate] based firmer in extremes." Republican Senator Jim Inhofe of Oklahoma also criticized the proposal, saying Kennedy was too radical and would further a left-wing agenda if appointed.

=== 2024 presidential campaign ===
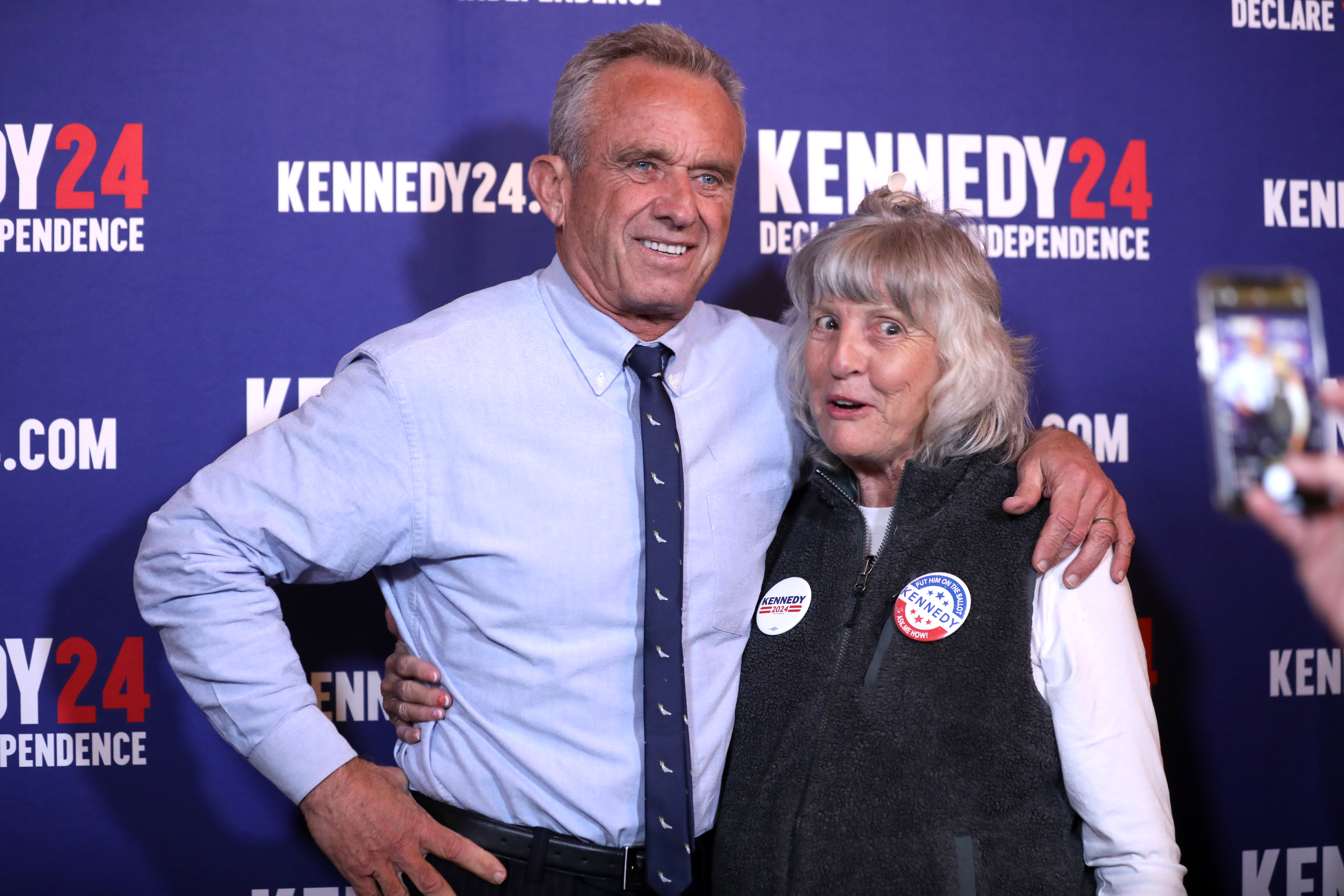
Kennedy with a supporter during his 2024 campaign

In a speech in New Hampshire on March 3, 2023, Kennedy said he was considering a run for president in 2024: "I am thinking about it. I've passed the biggest hurdle, which is that my wife has greenlighted it."

Kennedy filed his candidacy for the Democratic presidential nomination on April 5, 2023. He formally declared his candidacy at a campaign launch event at the Park Plaza Hotel in Boston on April 19. On October 9, he became an independent candidate in the election. He is the fifth member of his family to seek the presidency. (Note: John F. Kennedy ran a successful presidential campaign and was elected in 1960. Robert F. Kennedy ran for the Democratic nomination for president in 1968, but was assassinated in June that year. Kennedy's uncle-by-marriage Sargent Shriver ran for the nomination in 1976, but later withdrew from the race. Ted Kennedy ran for the Democratic nomination in the 1980 election, but was defeated in the primaries by incumbent Democratic president Jimmy Carter.)

Listing many false conspiracy theories that Kennedy used during campaign appearances, PolitiFact named his presidential campaign its 2023 "lie of the year".

In May 2024, Kennedy was considered for the Libertarian Party's nomination for president, but lost to Chase Oliver. In Colorado, the state Libertarian Party selected Kennedy, but Oliver appeared on the ballot as the Libertarian nominee.

Kennedy's campaign was noted for receiving significant support from Republican donors and Trump allies who believed he would serve as a "spoiler", taking the votes of those who would have otherwise voted for the Democratic nominee. In August 2023, it was revealed that Timothy Mellon, who gave $15 million to Donald Trump's super PAC MAGA Inc., also donated $5 million to Kennedy's super PAC, making him Kennedy's largest single donor. Mellon donated another $5 million to Kennedy's super PAC in April and another $50 million to MAGA Inc. in May. In July 2024, Forbes reported that Mellon had donated $25 million to Kennedy and Kennedy-affiliated groups.

In August, facing declining poll numbers, limited campaign funds, and increasing challenges to ballot access, the Kennedy campaign began appealing to the Harris and Trump campaigns, seeking a cabinet post in exchange for an endorsement. Harris reportedly rebuffed Kennedy, but Trump said he "probably would [consider the offer], if something like that would happen". On August 22, the Kennedy campaign filed to be removed from the Arizona ballot amid reports he would drop out to endorse Trump.

On August 23, Kennedy dropped out and endorsed Trump, saying he intended to maintain ballot placement in certain non-swing states. This was a reversal for Kennedy, who had previously said he would "under no circumstances" join Trump on a presidential ticket, that his and Trump's positions "could not be further apart", and that Trump was a "terrible human being", a "discredit to democracy", and "probably a sociopath". In his speech endorsing Trump, Kennedy described speaking with Trump and his advisers and said he discovered that he and Trump were "aligned on many key issues".

In December, Kennedy was featured in the documentary film Inactive, Americaʼs Silent Killer, about the growing global epidemic of physical inactivity and its impact on health, particularly in North America.

== Secretary of Health and Human Services (2025–present) ==
=== Nomination and confirmation ===
Kennedy testifies at his first Senate confirmation hearing on January 29, 2025, before the Senate Finance Committee.

Days before the 2024 United States presidential election, Donald Trump said that Kennedy would have "a big role in health care". According to The Washington Post, Kennedy's position was not originally meant to be one requiring Senate confirmation. On November 14, after winning the election, Trump announced his intention to nominate Kennedy for secretary of health and human services (HHS). During the week of December 16, 2024, Kennedy began meeting with senators in advance of his confirmation hearings. In January 2025, the Senate Committee on Finance and the Senate Health, Education, Labor, and Pensions Committee (HELP) held hearings on Kennedy's nomination. Senator Bernie Sanders, the committee's ranking member, was critical of Kennedy during the hearing.

In December 2024, more than 75 Nobel Laureates urged the US Senate to oppose Kennedy's nomination, saying he would "put the public's health in jeopardy". As of January 9, 2025, over 17,000 doctors who are members of Committee to Protect Health Care had signed an open letter urging the Senate to oppose Kennedy's nomination, arguing that Kennedy had spent decades undermining public confidence in vaccines and spreading false claims and conspiracy theories, that he was a danger to national healthcare, and that he was unqualified to lead the Department of Health and Human Services. As of January 24, 2025, more than 80 organizations had voiced opposition to Kennedy's nomination. During his January 29, 2025, Senate confirmation hearing, Kennedy said all his children were vaccinated.

Kennedy disclosed to an HHS ethics official his arrangement with the law firm Wisner Baum, which specializes in pharmaceutical drug injury cases, under which Kennedy earns 10% of the fees awarded in contingency cases he refers to the firm. If confirmed as HHS director, Kennedy would retain the arrangement only in cases that do not directly affect the federal government. He listed his income from Wisner Baum for this arrangement as $856,559. Before assuming the position of director of HHS, he will receive from the law firm the complete and final payments for concluded cases against the US government. He added that will assign his son his interests in litigation against the maker of Gardasil, a vaccine given to prevent cervical cancer caused by human papillomavirus (HPV).

On February 4, 2025, the Senate Committee on Finance voted 14–13 to forward Kennedy's nomination to a full Senate vote. The deciding vote was from Bill Cassidy, who was originally hesitant, but said he had received "serious commitments" from the Trump administration and "honest counsel" from Vice President JD Vance in exchange for his support of Kennedy's nomination. According to the Senate HELP Committee site, Cassidy, a doctor who practiced for 30 years before becoming a politician, told the committee that he had had a patient with acute hepatitis B who needed a liver transplant and had to be transported by Medivac. He called the transplant "an invasive, quarter-of-a-million-dollar surgery—in 2000—that, even if successful, would leave this young woman with a lifetime of $50,000 per year medical bills", adding, "As I saw her take off, I was so depressed. A $50 of vaccine could have prevented this all". Of the two committees that Kennedy spoke before, only the Senate Finance was to vote on his nomination.

On February 13, 2025, the Senate confirmed Kennedy as Secretary of Health and Human Services by a vote of 52 to 48, with former Senate Republican Conference leader Mitch McConnell the sole Republican to vote against him. A polio survivor, McConnell was critical of efforts to revoke approval of the polio vaccine. He said, "Anyone seeking the Senate's consent to serve in the incoming administration would do well to steer clear of even the appearance of association with such efforts." All Democrats also voted against Kennedy.

On March 16, 2026, Massachusetts District Court judge Brian Murphy ordered the reversal of all decisions made by the Advisory Committee for Immunization Practices by Kennedy-appointed panelists. Murphy found that the government had disregarded the scientific method and "thereby undermined the integrity of its actions". His ruling was in response to a lawsuit brought by six medical organizations that contended Kennedy and his appointees had made "arbitrary and capricious" changes to the childhood vaccine schedule, bypassing the evidence-based practice that had underpinned it.

On August 19, 2026, U.S. District Judge Christopher R. Cooper enjoined Kennedy from cutting HHS funding for evidence-based teenage pregnancy prevention. The injunction was delivered partially because the decision to swap to programs based on abstinence-only sex education and teenage marriage was justified with by AI-generated research.

=== Tenure ===
Kennedy being sworn in as the secretary of health and human services on February 13, 2025.

On February 13, 2025, Kennedy was sworn in as the 26th secretary of health and human services in the Oval Office by Justice Neil Gorsuch. He is the first independent or third-party presidential candidate to become a cabinet member after running for president.

In October 2026, Kennedy unilaterally passed a rule to allow compound pharmacies to produce the peptides BPC-157, Epitalon, KPV, MOTS-c, Semax, and TB-500.

==== "Make America Healthy Again" executive order ====
Minutes after Kennedy was sworn in, Trump signed Executive Order 14211, which ordered the creation of a "Make America Healthy Again" (MAHA) Commission to be chaired by Kennedy. Its objectives include investigating the incidence and causes of chronic childhood diseases and "assess[ing] the prevalence of and threat posed by the prescription of selective serotonin reuptake inhibitors, antipsychotics, mood stabilizers, stimulants, and weight-loss drugs".

==== Firing staff ====
On February 14, 2025, agencies including the Centers for Disease Control and Prevention (CDC) and the National Institutes of Health (NIH) were informed that approximately 5,200 newly hired federal health workers were to be fired that day.

In April 2025, Kennedy fired most of the staff of the National Institute for Occupational Safety and Health, shuttering nearly all its departments. Programs, including approvals of new workplace safety equipment and research into firefighter health, were abruptly canceled.

In June 2025, Kennedy announced that he was removing all 17 members of the Advisory Committee on Immunization Practices (ACIP) and replacing them with new members. In May 2026, he fired two members of the Preventive Services Task Force panel.

==== Stopping ads for vaccine to reduce severity of seasonal flu ====
On February 20, 2025, during an unusually severe influenza season, HHS instructed the CDC to suspend its ad campaign promoting flu vaccination. The advertising, in part a response to declining flu vaccination rates, promoted the message that vaccination would result in much milder symptoms and lower chances of becoming severely ill for those with the flu.

==== 2025 Southwest United States measles outbreak ====
Kennedy's tenure began during a measles outbreak in the southwestern US, including the first measles death in a decade. The Texas Department of State Health Services reported 146 cases, 20 hospitalizations, and one death in late February. In his first public comments, on February 26, Kennedy said there had been two deaths and that "there have been four measles outbreaks this year. In this country last year there were 16. So it's not unusual. We have measles outbreaks every year." Such outbreaks of the disease had been declared domestically eliminated until the measles resurgence in the United States that began in the 2010s. He also falsely claimed that the people hospitalized were done so "mainly for quarantine", a claim healthcare professionals refuted. US Senator Ron Wyden wrote: "Nothing about kids dying from measles is normal. Anti-vaxxers like RFK Jr. and the Republicans who enable them are responsible for every single one of these deaths."

Days later, Kennedy called the outbreak a "top priority" for the department. His messaging regarding the outbreak cited fringe theories blaming poor diet and health. He promoted cod liver oil, steroid inhalation, an antibiotic, vitamin A, and other questionable treatments that he called "almost miraculous". While recommending vaccination against measles, he also overstated the vaccine's potential harms and suggested that immunity from natural infection would be better. The CDC says that the MMR vaccine is "much safer than getting measles, mumps, or rubella". The antibiotic is not effective against a viral disease such as measles. Vitamin A is part of measles treatment, primarily in areas where children may be deficient in it.

On February 28, HHS's top spokesperson, Thomas Corry, abruptly resigned, two weeks after being sworn in as the assistant secretary of public affairs. He reportedly clashed with Kennedy over his management of the department during the measles outbreak.

On March 2, Kennedy was criticized for writing an op-ed for Fox News that called vaccines a "personal choice" and recommended vitamins and good nutrition to combat measles. But he also wrote in the piece: "Vaccines not only protect individual children from measles, but also contribute to community immunity, protecting those who are unable to be vaccinated due to medical reasons."

After Kennedy took to the media to falsely claim that vitamin A is both a prophylactic and treatment for measles, doctors in Texas began to see children infected with measles also having symptoms of vitamin A toxicity.

On March 28, Kennedy told Peter Marks, the head of the FDA's vaccine program, that he should resign or be fired. Marks wrote a resignation letter that lamented Kennedy's attempts to erode trust in vaccines: "It has become clear that truth and transparency are not desired by the secretary, but rather he wishes subservient confirmation of his misinformation and lies." Days earlier, the CDC head of communications said after his own resignation, "Kennedy and his team are working to bend science to fit their own narratives, rather than allowing facts to guide policy."

In April, Kennedy praised Texas doctor Ben Edwards as one of two "extraordinary healers" using unverified treatments for measles; the week before, Edwards was aware that he was infected with measles when he met children and parents at his clinic without wearing a mask.

After a second child died from measles in Texas in April, Kennedy said, "the most effective way to prevent the spread of measles is the MMR vaccine". Two days later, in an interview with CBS News, he said, "We encourage people to get the measles vaccine", adding that both his position and that of the federal government was that people should get the measles vaccine, although the government should not mandate it.

==== MAHA report ====
On May 22, 2025, the MAHA Commission released a report about childhood chronic disease. It was described as "wide-ranging" and claimed that a range of factors, including diet, vaccinations, medical prescriptions, physical stress, food additives, and pesticides, are "potential drivers behind the rise in childhood chronic disease that present the clearest opportunities for progress".

On May 29, NOTUS first reported that some of the studies the MAHA Commission's report cited did not exist; the authors of several other studies the report cited said their work was mischaracterized. Medical researcher Ivan Oransky said the errors were characteristic of generative AI usage: "They come up with references that share a lot of words and authors and even journals, journal names, but they're not real." Some of the report's citation URLs contained the string "oaicite", indicating a tool produced by OpenAI was used.

White House press secretary Karoline Leavitt said these errors were "formatting issues that are being addressed and the report will be updated. But it does not negate the substance of the report, which, as you know, is one of the most transformative health reports that has ever been released by the federal government." Asked whether the MAHA Commission's report used generative AI, Leavitt said, "I can't speak to that." The report was repeatedly updated that day. NOTUS released a follow-up addressing the updates and reported that while several errors from the original report had been edited or removed, new errors were found, including updated citations that misinterpret scientific studies.

==== CDC leadership departures ====
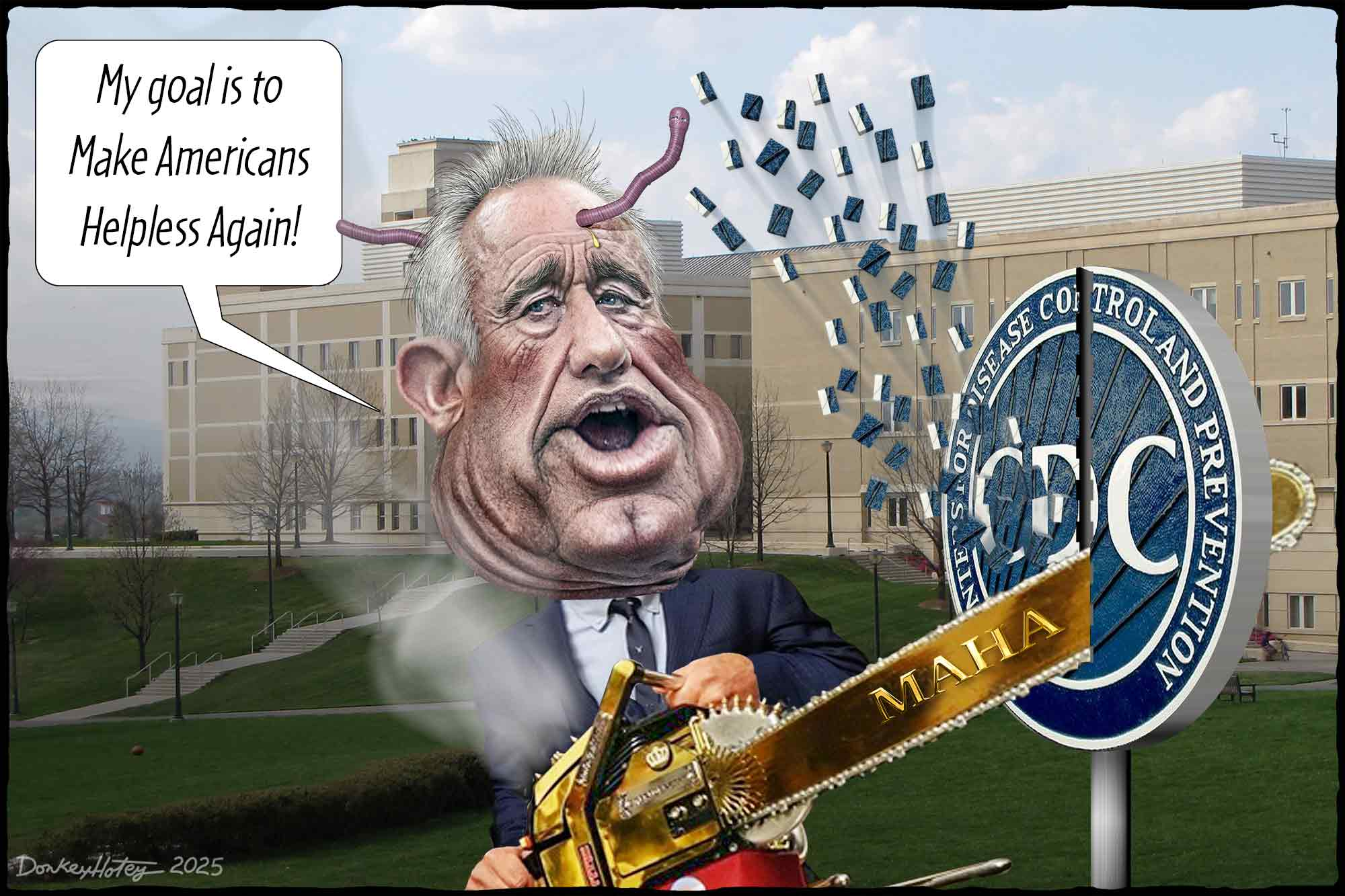
A political cartoon depicting Kennedy using a chainsaw labeled "MAHA" to saw the sign of the National Center for Immunization and Respiratory Diseases (NCIRD) headquarters, in reference to the several oustings of NCIRD staff under his tenure

When CDC director Susan Monarez was ousted in August 2025, several CDC leaders quit over Kennedy's anti-science policies. In a resignation note, National Center for Immunization and Respiratory Diseases director Demetre Daskalakis wrote that Kennedy and his appointees "threaten the lives of the youngest Americans and pregnant people". In a statement, lawyers for Monarez said that Kennedy had been "weaponizing public health for political gain" and "putting millions of American lives at risk". Also among those leaving were Debra Houry, the chief medical officer, and the heads of several other directorates. Houry's farewell announcement referenced vaccine misinformation, the 2025 measles outbreak, and the 2025 shooting attack on the CDC. Days after the departure, nine former CDC leaders from both Democratic and Republican administrations wrote in The New York Times that the shakeup at the agency was "unlike anything our country has ever experienced" and that Kennedy was "endangering every American's health."

==== Autism Data Science Initiative ====
On September 22, 2025, Kennedy approved a $50 million grant to the National Institute of Health (NIH) for 13 projects to "help transform autism research" through the proposed Autism Data Science Initiative.

==== CDC revises stance on autism and vaccines ====
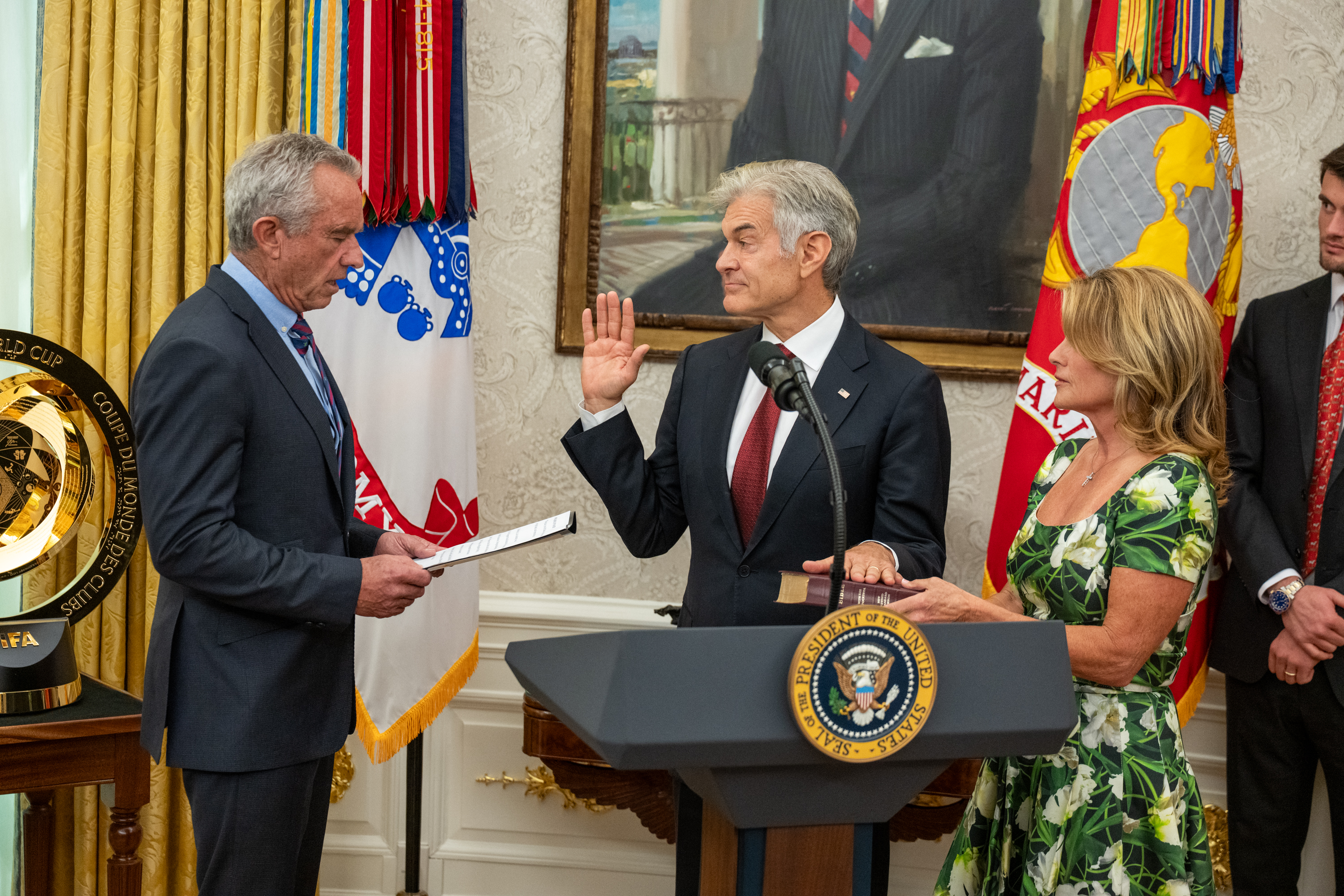
Kennedy swearing in Mehmet Oz as administrator of the Centers for Medicare and Medicaid Services on April 18, 2025

On November 19, 2025, the CDC website on "Autism and Vaccines" was radically changed from its September 2025 version. In an interview, Kennedy reportedly said that "he personally instructed the Centers for Disease Control and Prevention to abandon its longstanding position that vaccines do not cause autism—a move that underscores his determination to challenge scientific consensus and bend the health department to his will."

FactCheck.org wrote that the change was not evidence-based. The revised site makes several false statements, contradicting longstanding scientific evidence that supports the absence of a causal link between childhood vaccines and autism. According to CDC staff, required scientific vetting for all public-facing agency webpages was entirely bypassed in this instance. The Wall Street Journal wrote, "no association has been proven between vaccines and autism". Numerous medical associations and professionals immediately issued statements protesting the changes, including experts from the Center for Infectious Disease Research and Policy (CIDRAP); Children's Hospital of Philadelphia; Stanford University School of Medicine; Texas Children's Hospital Center for Vaccine Development; the American Academy of Pediatrics (AAP); Harvard T.H. Chan School of Public Health; and The Autism Science Foundation.

==== Hepatitis B vaccines ====
On December 5, 2025, Kennedy's Advisory Committee on Immunization Practices (ACIP) vaccine panel voted to end the CDC's universal recommendation that newborn babies receive Hepatitis B vaccine doses and instead "recommend individual-based decision-making for parents deciding whether to give the hepatitis B vaccine, including the birth dose, to infants born to women who test negative for the virus. For those infants not receiving the birth dose, ACIP suggested in its recommendation that the initial dose be administered no earlier than two months of age".

The Kennedy-led ACIP also voted to "recommend that when evaluating the need for a subsequent hepatitis B vaccine dose in children, parents should consult with health care providers to decide whether to test antibody levels to hepatitis surface antigen to evaluate adequacy of protection through serology results." This vote came "despite no evidence suggesting fewer doses than the standard series of three offer lifelong protection".

Joseph Hibbeln, an ACIP member who voted against the change, said: "This has a great potential to cause harm, and I simply hope that the committee will accept its responsibility when this harm is caused."

Senate Health, Education, Labor and Pensions Committee chairman Bill Cassidy wrote: "Ending the recommendation for newborns makes it more likely the number of cases will begin to increase again. This makes America sicker."

== Views ==
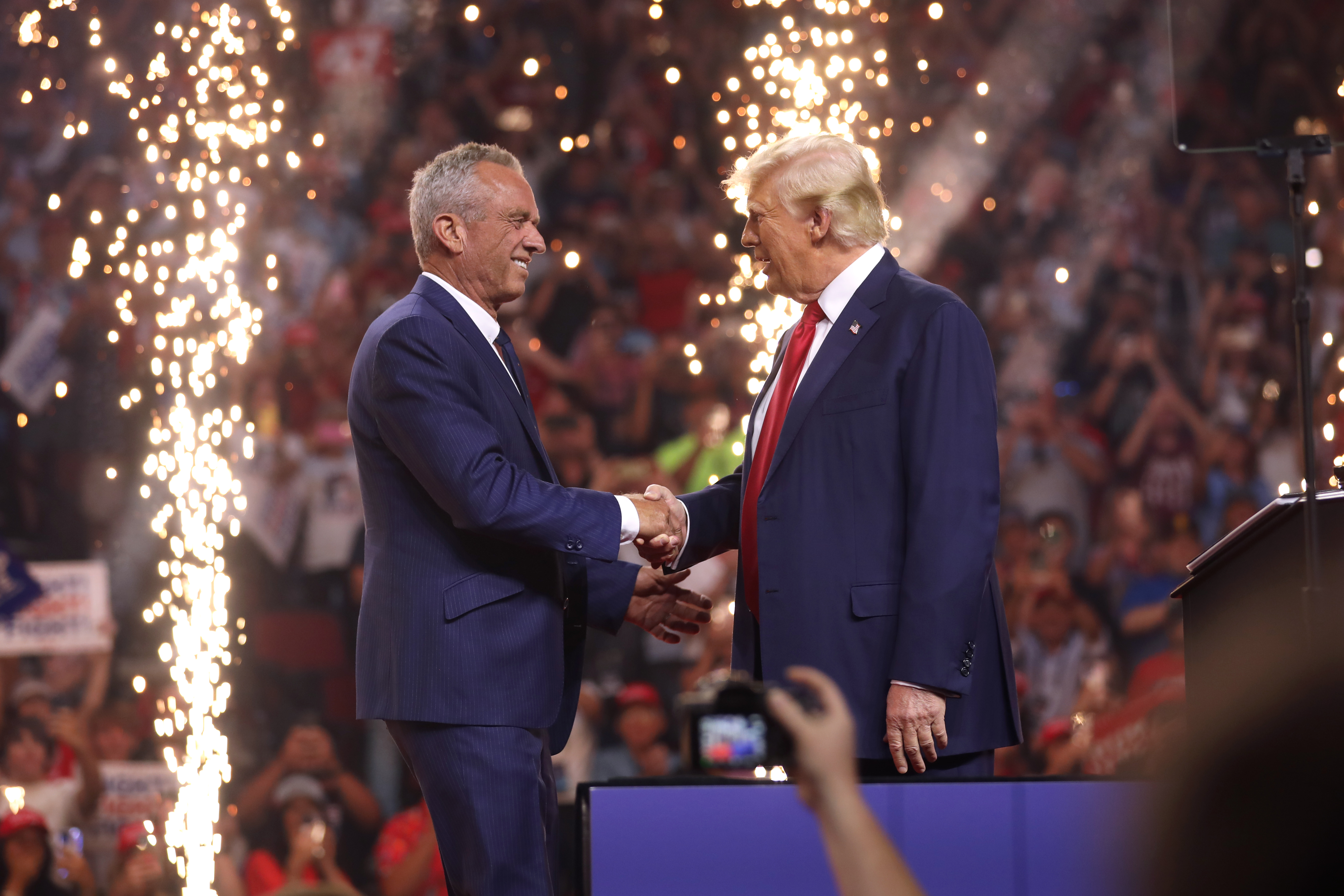
Kennedy endorsing Trump at a rally in Arizona on August 23, 2024

Since 2005, Kennedy has promoted vaccine misinformation and public-health conspiracy theories, including the chemtrail conspiracy theory, HIV/AIDS denialism, and the scientifically disproved claim of a causal link between vaccines and autism. He has drawn criticism for fueling vaccine hesitancy amid a social climate that gave rise to the deadly measles outbreaks in Samoa and Tonga. In 2026, Kennedy drew criticism for anti-Arab remarks.

=== Anti-vaccine advocacy and conspiracy theories on public health ===
Kennedy is a prominent voice in the anti-vaccine movement, spreading anti-vaccine misinformation, disinformation, and propaganda. The infectious disease specialist Michael Osterholm has said that Kennedy's "anti-vaccine disinformation" is effective "because it's portrayed to the public with graphs and figures and what appears to be scientific data. He has perfected the art of illusion of fact." Osterholm added:

This is about people's lives. And the consequences of promoting this kind of disinformation, as credible as it may seem, is simply dangerous.

Kennedy has said that he is not against vaccines but wants them to be more thoroughly tested and investigated. In Thimerosal: Let the Science Speak (2015), he writes that he does not see himself as anti-vaccine: "People who advocate for safer vaccines should not be marginalized or denounced as anti-vaccine. I am pro-vaccine. I had all six of my children vaccinated. I believe that vaccines have saved the lives of hundreds of millions of humans over the past century and that broad vaccine coverage is critical to public health. But I want our vaccines to be as safe as possible." But in 2023, Kennedy said, "There's no vaccine that is safe and effective."

In January 2024, Kennedy published a podcast about Lyme disease in which he said it is "highly likely to have been a military weapon" developed at the Plum Island Animal Disease Center. Multiple experts and authoritative sources have debunked the charge and called it "absurd".

== Personal life ==
=== General interests ===
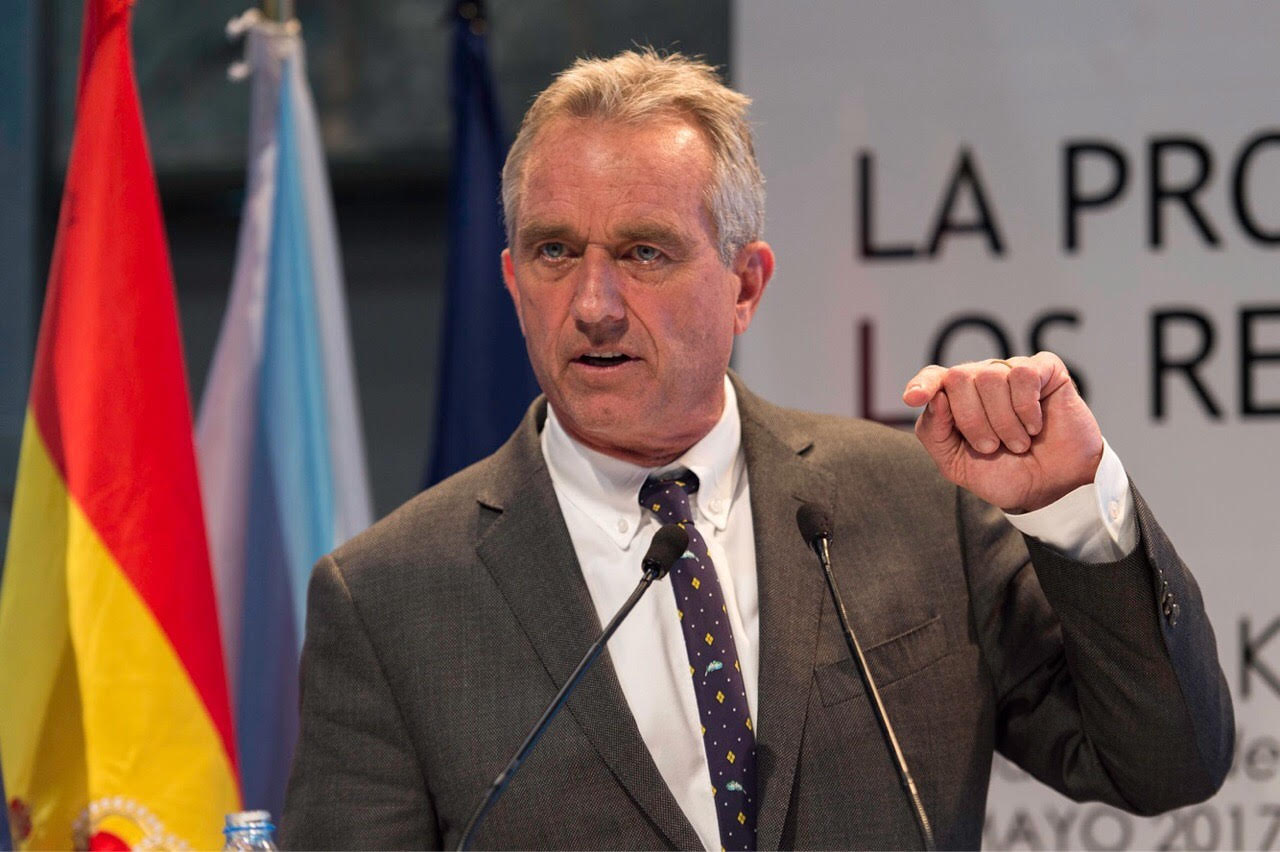
Kennedy speaking at the Foro La Región in Ourense, Spain in 2017

Kennedy is a licensed master falconer and has trained hawks since he was 11. He breeds hawks and falcons and is also licensed as a raptor propagator and a wildlife rehabilitator. He holds permits for Federal Game Keeper, Bird Bander, and Scientific Collector. He was president of the New York State Falconry Association from 1988 to 1991. In 1987, while on Governor Mario Cuomo's New York State Falconry Advising Committee, Kennedy authored New York State's examination to qualify apprentice falconers. Later that year, he wrote the New York State Apprentice Falconer's Manual, which was published by the New York State Department of Environmental Conservation and remains in use.

Kennedy is also a whitewater kayaker. His father introduced him and his siblings to whitewater kayaking during trips down the Green and Yampa Rivers in Utah and Colorado, the Columbia River, the Middle Fork Salmon in Idaho, and the Upper Hudson Gorge. Between 1976 and 1981, Kennedy was a partner and guide at a whitewater company, Utopian, based in West Forks, Maine. He organized and led several "first-descent" whitewater expeditions to Latin America, including three hitherto unexplored rivers: the Apurimac, Peru, in 1975; the Atrato, Colombia, in 1979; and the Caroni, Venezuela, in 1982. In 1993, he made an early descent of the Great Whale River in northern Quebec, Canada.

In 2015, Kennedy took two of his sons to the Yukon to visit Mount Kennedy and run the Alsek River, a whitewater river fed by the Alsek Glacier. Mount Kennedy was Canada's highest unclimbed peak when the Canadian government named it for John F. Kennedy in 1964. In 1965, Kennedy's father became the first person to climb Mount Kennedy.

=== Marriages and children ===
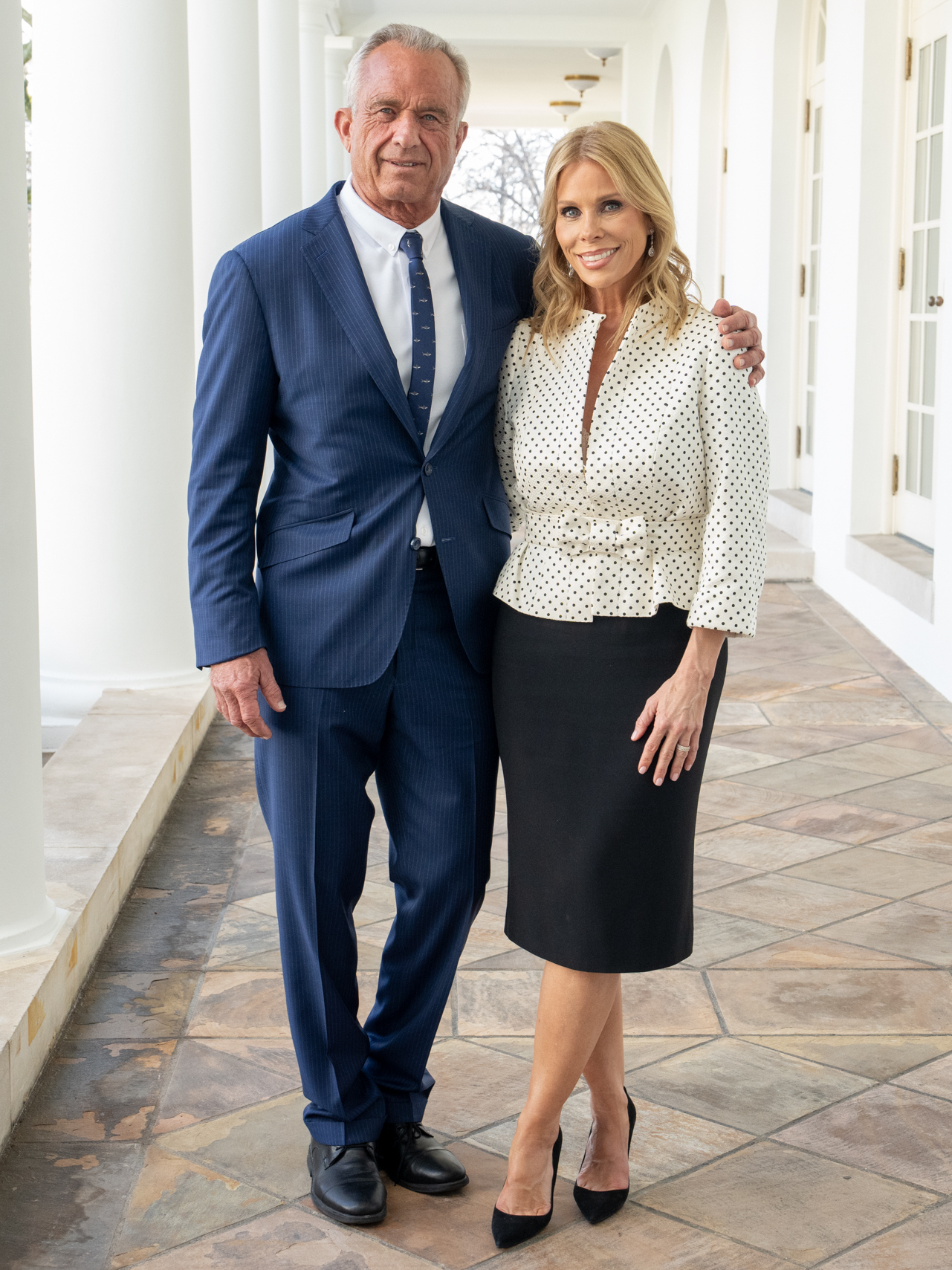
Kennedy with his third wife, Cheryl Hines, in February 2025

On April 3, 1982, Kennedy married Emily Ruth Black, whom he met at the University of Virginia School of Law. Kennedy and Black separated in 1992 and divorced in 1994.

On April 15, 1994, Kennedy married architect and designer Mary Kathleen Richardson, a close friend of his sister Kerry, aboard a research vessel on the Hudson River. Kennedy has six children, two with Black and four with Richardson. His eldest child, Robert F. Kennedy III, is a director and screenwriter. Kennedy was given the nickname "Bobby" growing up.

During his marriage to Richardson, Kennedy was known among his friends for sending explicit nude photos of women that they presumed he had taken, according to Vanity Fair. He reportedly engaged in multiple affairs during the marriage. His friends later called him a "lifelong philanderer". On May 12, 2010, Kennedy filed for divorce from Richardson. On May 16, 2012, Richardson was found dead in a building on the grounds of her home in Bedford, New York. The Westchester County Medical Examiner ruled the death a suicide due to asphyxiation from hanging. The medical examiner's report noted her fingers were caught between the neck and the noose when she was found dead, indicating a struggle to free herself. Upon arriving at the scene, Richardson's sister told Kennedy, "you have killed my sister".

Before her death, Richardson had discovered Kennedy's personal journal from 2001, in which he recorded sexual encounters with 37 different women. According to Kennedy, Richardson passed the journal along "to her sisters with instructions that, if anything happened to her, [it should be] published in the press". During their divorce, Richardson began exhibiting signs of drug and alcohol abuse and psychiatric distress.

After her death, Kennedy won a court case against Richardson's siblings to have her buried alongside fellow Kennedy family members in St. Francis Xavier Cemetery in Centerville, Massachusetts, instead of closer to her siblings in New York. Shortly after her burial, Kennedy had her body disinterred and moved to an unmarked grave in an empty area of the cemetery. At the time, the Kennedy family was planning to purchase 50 plots in the same area due to overcrowding. Kennedy's niece Saoirse Kennedy Hill was buried next to Richardson after her death from a drug overdose at age 22.

In 2011, Kennedy began dating the actress Cheryl Hines. They married on August 2, 2014, at the Kennedy Compound. The couple were introduced by Larry David, Hines's co-star on HBO's Curb Your Enthusiasm. Kennedy and Hines reside in Los Angeles and Cape Cod, Massachusetts.

In September 2024, Olivia Nuzzi, a reporter for New York magazine who had been covering his presidential campaign, told her editors that she had been in a relationship with Kennedy, which she described as personal but not physical.

=== Health ===
During Kennedy's college years, he began having heart problems, which he has said were caused by caffeine, stress, and sleep deprivation.

In his 40s, Kennedy developed adductor spasmodic dysphonia, an organic voice disorder that causes his voice to quaver and makes speech difficult. It is a form of involuntary movement affecting the larynx, related to dystonia. Kennedy said he traveled to Kyoto, Japan, for a procedure where a titanium bridge was inserted between his vocal cords to try to relieve the disorder.

Kennedy began experiencing severe short- and long-term memory loss and mental fog in 2010. In a 2012 divorce court deposition, he attributed neurological issues to "a worm that got into my brain and ate a portion of it and then died", in addition to mercury poisoning from eating large quantities of tuna. The Washington Post reported that Kennedy's campaign "has not released his medical records that could verify his account, and Kennedy has previously spread health misinformation, including about mercury in vaccines".

=== Religion ===
Kennedy is a Roman Catholic. In 2005, journalist Michael Paulson called him "a deeply devout Catholic who attends daily Mass". Kennedy considers Francis of Assisi his patron saint and a role model. In a 2005 interview with The Boston Globe, he said he was deeply inspired by Francis's devotion to social justice, helping the poor, animal welfare, and environmentalism; Francis is a patron saint of ecology.

In 2004, Kennedy published a biography, Saint Francis of Assisi: A Life of Joy. He said Catholicism was a vehicle of his environmentalism, adding, "environmental work is spiritual work". Despite identifying as pro-life, Kennedy also identifies with liberal Catholicism. He criticized the church's argument that John Kerry should have been denied communion because of his support for abortion rights.

In a 2018 interview with Vatican News, Kennedy expressed his admiration for Pope John XXIII, who is best known for his modernization of the church in the 1960s. Kennedy said, "the Church should be an instrument of justice and kindness around the world."

=== Sexual assault allegations ===
In July 2024, Vanity Fair reported that in the late 1990s, when he was in his 40s, Kennedy engaged in sexual misconduct with Eliza Cooney, a 23-year-old part-time babysitter for his children. Cooney alleges that Kennedy groped her and touched her inappropriately on multiple occasions and asked her to rub lotion on his back when the two were alone in a bedroom.

Kennedy called this Vanity Fair piece a "lot of garbage". When asked specifically about Cooney's allegation, he responded, "I am not a church boy. I had a very, very rambunctious youth. I said in my announcement speech that I have so many skeletons in my closet that if they could all vote, I could run for king of the world." When pressed further, he said he had no comment.

After the Vanity Fair piece was published, Cooney said that Kennedy texted her: "I have no memory of this incident, but I apologize sincerely for anything I ever did that made you feel uncomfortable or anything I did or said that offended you or hurt your feelings. I never intended you any harm. If I hurt you, it was inadvertent. I feel badly for doing so." Cooney said, "I don't know if it's an apology if you say 'I don't remember' ... In the context of all his public appearances, it seemed a little bit—it didn't match. It was like a throwaway."

=== Relationship with Jeffrey Epstein ===
In August 2025, Ghislaine Maxwell said Kennedy was among those who traveled with Jeffrey Epstein, a claim backed by travel logs released during Maxwell's 2021 trial, though she said she "never saw anything inappropriate" from him during that time. In response, Kennedy initially claimed that he had flown only once on Epstein's plane for a family Easter trip, only to later confirm a second instance in which he joined Epstein for a fossil hunting trip to South Dakota.

In November 2025, Kennedy was confirmed to be among those listed in Epstein's personal contact book. The release of the Epstein Files under the Epstein Files Transparency Act included an email from Epstein replying "whoops" to an email from an associate informing him of Richardson Kennedy's death. Kennedy has dismissed his ties to Epstein as merely social, pointing to his similarly knowing sexual predators Harvey Weinstein and Bill Cosby, among others.

=== Treatment of dead animals ===
In July 2024, an image of Kennedy holding a charred animal carcass captured in 2010 surfaced in a Vanity Fair story, which alleged that the carcass belonged to a dog and that Kennedy ate it. Kennedy denied that he ate dog meat, and said the animal carcass in the picture was a goat. According to Snopes, the carcass in the photo is lamb. Kennedy had eaten dog, horse, and guinea pig meat before 2001.

In August 2024, Kennedy released a video on X (formerly Twitter), acknowledging that in October 2014 he placed a dead six-month-old bear in Central Park after initially planning to skin it for meat. Kennedy said that the bear had been hit by a car in front of him and that he ultimately abandoned the carcass for fear that it would decay before he could preserve it, deliberately positioning the body to give the impression that it had been struck by a cyclist in Central Park. He released the video in advance of a story in The New Yorker that detailed the incident. At the time of the incident, the spectacle of a dead bear in a New York City park made the local news. A resulting necropsy by the New York State Department of Environmental Conservation found that the death was caused by "blunt force injuries consistent with a motor vehicle collision".

In a 2012 Town & Country magazine profile of Kennedy's daughter Kathleen ("Kick"), she recounted a story about how her father—who, she said, liked to study animal skulls and skeletons—used a chainsaw to sever the head of a dead beached whale in Hyannis Port, Massachusetts, then strapped the whale's head to the top of their minivan with bungee cords for the five-hour drive home, saying, "every time we accelerated on the highway, whale juice would pour into the windows of the car" and they "had plastic bags over our heads with mouth holes cut out, and people on the highway were giving us the finger, but that was just normal day-to-day stuff for us". In 2024, an environmental advocacy group asked the National Oceanic and Atmospheric Administration Fisheries Office of Law Enforcement to investigate possible violations of the Marine Mammal Protection and Endangered Species laws. The agency determined the allegation was unfounded.

According to Isabel Vincent's 2026 book RFK Jr: The Fall and Rise, Kennedy wrote in his November 11, 2001, diary entry that he had cut the penis off a road-killed raccoon. Vincent writes that Kennedy took the raccoon's genitals so he could "study them later".

=== Use and advocacy of psychedelics ===
Kennedy's father, Robert F. Kennedy Sr., reportedly took psychedelic drugs such as LSD and psilocybin in the early 1960s, and in 1966 he led a congressional investigation into the curtailing of many government-funded LSD therapy research projects, arguing that LSD "can be very, very helpful in our society if used properly". Kennedy's mother, Ethel Kennedy, reportedly underwent psychedelic-assisted therapy with LSD in the 1960s. In 2022, Kennedy disclosed his own use in the late 1960s of psychedelics such as LSD, saying he had a "wonderful experience" with LSD. He has also said that his close friends and son used and benefited from psychedelics. Kennedy has extensively advocated for medical use of psychedelics as the head of HHS.

== Bibliography ==
- Russell, Dick (June 20, 2023). The Real RFK Jr. Trials of a Truth Warrior. Skyhorse Publishing. p. 384. ISBN 978-1-5107-7609-8.

== Selected works ==
Kennedy has written books on subjects such as the environment, vaccinations, biography, and American heroes. Two of his books, The Real Anthony Fauci and Vax-Unvax: Let the Science Speak are New York Times Bestsellers.

- Kennedy, Robert F. Jr. (1978). Judge Frank M. Johnson Jr.: A biography. Putnam. ISBN 978-0-399-12123-4.
- Cronin, John; Kennedy, Robert F. Jr. (1997). The Riverkeepers: Two Activists Fight to Reclaim Our Environment as a Basic Human Right. New York: Scribner. ISBN 978-0-684-83908-0.
- Kennedy, Robert F. Jr. (2005). Crimes Against Nature: How George W. Bush and His Corporate Pals Are Plundering the Country and Highjacking Our Democracy. New York: HarperCollins. ISBN 978-0-06-074687-2.
- Kennedy, Robert F. Jr., ed. (2014). Thimerosal: Let the Science Speak: The Evidence Supporting the Immediate Removal of Mercury – a Known Neurotoxin – from Vaccines. New York: Skyhorse Publishing. ISBN 978-1-63220-601-5.
- Kennedy, Robert F. Jr. (2016). Framed: Why Michael Skakel Spent Over a Decade in Prison For a Murder He Didn't Commit. New York: Skyhorse Publishing. ISBN 978-1-5107-0177-9.
- Kennedy, Robert F. Jr. (2018). American Values: Lessons I Learned from My Family. Harper. ISBN 978-0-06-084834-7.
- Kennedy, Robert F. Jr.; Russell, Dick (2020). Climate in Crisis: Who's Causing It, Who's Fighting It, and How We Can Reverse It Before It's Too Late. Hot Books. ISBN 978-1-5107-6056-1.
- Kennedy, Robert F. Jr. (2021). The Real Anthony Fauci: Bill Gates, Big Pharma, and the Global War on Democracy and Public Health. Skyhorse Publishing. ISBN 978-1-5107-6680-8.
- Kennedy, Robert F. Jr. (2022). A Letter to Liberals: Censorship and COVID: an Attack on Science and American Ideals. Skyhorse Publishing. ISBN 978-1-5107-7559-6.
- Kennedy, Robert F. Jr.; Hooker, Brian (2023). Vax-Unvax: Let the Science Speak. Skyhorse Publishing. ISBN 978-1-5107-6696-9.
- Kennedy, Robert F. Jr. (2023). The Wuhan Cover-Up: And the Terrifying Bioweapons Arms Race. Skyhorse Publishing. ISBN 978-1-5107-7398-1.

=== Children's books ===
- St. Francis of Assisi: A Life of Joy. Hyperion. 2004. ISBN 978-0-7868-1875-4.
- Robert F. Kennedy Jr.'s American Heroes: The Story of Joshua Chamberlain and the American Civil War. New York: Hyperion. 2007. ISBN 978-1-4231-0771-2.
- Robert Smalls: The Boat Thief. New York: Hyperion. 2008. ISBN 978-1-4231-0802-3.

== Note ==
Political offices
Preceded by Xavier Becerra	United States Secretary of Health and Human Services; 2025–present	Incumbent
Order of precedence
Preceded by Keith Sonderling as United States Secretary of Labor	Order of precedence of the United States as United States Secretary of Health and Human Services	Succeeded by Scott Turner as United States Secretary of Housing and Urban Development
U.S. presidential line of succession
Preceded by Keith Sonderling as United States Secretary of Labor	Twelfth in line as United States Secretary of Health and Human Services	Succeeded by Scott Turner as United States Secretary of Housing and Urban Development
