= Epidemiology of measles =

Disability-adjusted life year for measles per 100,000 inhabitants, 2004. no data ≤ 10 10–25 25–50 50–75 75–100 100–250 250–500 500–750 750–1000 1000–1500 1500–2000 ≥ 2000

Measles is extremely contagious, but surviving the infection results in lifelong immunity, so its continued circulation in a community depends on the generation of susceptible hosts by birth of children. In communities which generate insufficient new hosts the disease will die out. This concept was first recognized by Bartlett in 1957, who referred to the minimum number supporting measles as the critical community size (CCS). Analysis of outbreaks in island communities suggested that the CCS for measles is c. 250,000. Due to the development of vaccination against measles, the world has seen a 99% decrease in measles related cases compared to cases before the vaccine was developed.

== Incidence ==
Reported cases
| WHO-Region | 1980 | 1990 | 2000 | 2005 | 2010 | 2015 | 2020 | 2021 | 2022 |
|---|---|---|---|---|---|---|---|---|---|
| African Region | 1,240,993 | 481,204 | 520,102 | 316,219 | 199,174 | 52,758 | 115,369 | 88,789 | 97,237 |
| Region of the Americas | 257,790 | 218,579 | 1,754 | 85 | 247 | 611 | 9,996 | 682 | 47 |
| Eastern Mediterranean Region | 341,624 | 59,058 | 38,592 | 15,069 | 10,072 | 21,418 | 6,769 | 26,089 | 56,401 |
| European Region | 492,660 | 185,818 | 37,421 | 37,338 | 30,625 | 25,957 | 10,945 | 99 | 825 |
| South-East Asia Region | 199,535 | 224,925 | 78,558 | 88,973 | 54,228 | 48,888 | 9,389 | 6,448 | 49,201 |
| Western Pacific Region | 1,319,640 | 155,490 | 177,052 | 128,017 | 49,460 | 65,176 | 6,605 | 1,064 | 1,442 |
| Worldwide | 3,852,242 | 1,325,074 | 853,479 | 585,701 | 343,806 | 214,808 | 159,073 | 123,171 | 205,153 |

In 2018, the WHO estimated that there were around 353,236 cases of measles worldwide. This has since decreased as in 2020 there were 159,000 approximate cases. Death from measles was reported in approximately 0.2% of the cases in the United States from 1985 through 1992. In populations with high levels of malnutrition and a lack of adequate healthcare, mortality can be as high as 10%. Increased immunization has led to an estimated 78% drop in measles deaths among UN member states.

Even in countries where vaccination has been introduced, vaccination rates may remain low due to parents choosing not to have their children vaccinated. In Ireland, vaccination was introduced in 1985. There were 99,903 cases that year. Within two years, the number of cases had fallen to 201, but this fall was not sustained. Measles is a leading cause of vaccine-preventable childhood mortality. Worldwide, the fatality rate has been significantly reduced by a vaccination campaign led by partners in the Measles Initiative: the American Red Cross, the United States Centers for Disease Control and Prevention (CDC), the United Nations Foundation, UNICEF and the WHO. Globally, measles fell 60% from an estimated 873,000 deaths in 1999 to 345,000 in 2005. Estimates for 2008 indicate deaths fell further to 164,000 globally, with 77% of the remaining measles deaths in 2008 occurring within the Southeast Asian region.

In 2006–07 there were 12,132 cases in 32 European countries: 85% occurred in five countries: Germany, Italy, Romania, Switzerland and the UK. 80% occurred in children and there were 7 deaths.

Five out of six WHO regions have set goals to eliminate measles, and at the 63rd World Health Assembly in May 2010, delegates agreed a global target of a 95% reduction in measles mortality by 2015 from the level seen in 2000, as well as to move towards eventual eradication. However, no specific global target date for eradication has yet been agreed to as of May 2010.

On January 22, 2014, the World Health Organization and the Pan American Health Organization declared and certified Colombia free of the measles while becoming the first Latin American country to abolish the infection within its borders.

In 2018, The WHO tells us the global annual incidence was about 46 million. During this time, the African Region reported the most cases, about 40%, seen primarily from Nigeria, and Eastern Mediterranean regions. In these specific areas, the incidence was greatly seen in those less than one year old. Studies show that about 95% were immune by 15 years old, making it increasingly common for the incidence of measles to occur in young children.

Cases reported in the first three months of 2019 were 300% higher than in the first three months of 2018, with outbreaks in every region of the world, even in countries with high overall vaccination coverage where it spread among clusters of unvaccinated people.

Through the recent improvement of decreasing measles incidence and mortality rates across the world, recently there has been setbacks. Since 2000, the MCV coverage around the world has decreased and the total cases of measles has increased from 132,490 in 2016, to 869,700 in 2019. Though many countries have eliminated measles, several countries have discovered new cases in 2019. Growing concern has been generating in increase cases of measles as incidence in measles have increased in recent years due to anti-vaccination movements due to religion and politics.

Measles eradication has been challenging for many countries to maintain herd immunity. Due to political unrest, economic challenges, and accessibility to healthcare and proper vaccinations achieving proper vaccination levels in developing countries has halted. Another challenge faced worldwide is vaccination hesitancy. The World Health Organization and Centers for Disease Control and Prevention have listed this is a top ten challenge to global health in reducing the incidence of measles.

In April 2020, the WHO indicated that many countries had started suspending their measles vaccination programs due to the impact of the COVID-19 pandemic. It is projected that 117 million children will be at risk of infection. Currently all 194 countries have started to routinely vaccinate children with the MCV vaccine, and 122 countries have included the MMR into their routine child immunization schedules.

== Outbreaks ==
As measles contagion is high, it can spread rapidly through the population. The incubation period for measles is 10–12 days, and is characterized by seasonal epidemics, and spreads quickly against non-vaccinated persons. Measles is quite uncommon in populations of highly vaccinated areas, yet when it does occur, it is more commonly seen in adults.

The development of the measles vaccine has been vital in reducing outbreaks. Without a measles vaccine, measles epidemics could happen every 2 to 5 years and last up to 3 to 4 months at a time.

Commonly outbreaks in one country spread to others and this can be traced by close examination of the virus DNA. As of 2020 measles is widespread and there have been over the last decade many outbreaks in areas that were formerly declared measles free. See below for individual countries by continent.

Some examples of measles spreading between countries are:

- As of May 2011, over 17,000 cases of measles had so far been reported from France between January 2008 and April 2011, including 2 deaths in 2010 and 6 deaths in 2011. Over 7,500 of these cases fell in the first three months of 2011, and Spain, Turkey, Macedonia, and Belgium have been among the other European countries reporting further smaller outbreaks. The French outbreak has been specifically linked to a further outbreak in Quebec in 2011, where 327 cases have been reported between January and June 1, 2011, and the European outbreaks in general have also been implicated in further small outbreaks in the US, where 40 separate importations from the European region had been reported between January 1 and May 20.
- In 2014 many unvaccinated US citizens visiting the Philippines, and other countries, contracted measles, resulting in 288 cases being recorded in the United States in the first five months of 2014, a twenty-year high. In Vietnam, in the measles epidemic in the beginning of 2014, as of April 19 there were 8,500 measles cases and 114 fatalities, and as of May 30 there were 21,639 measles cases and 142 fatalities.
- The increase of measles in January and February 2022 sparked concern due to the COVID-19 pandemic and the displacement of millions due to conflict crises. This includes Ukraine, Ethiopia, Somalia, and Afghanistan as this disrupts the routine immunization schedule and the primary focus is the safety of citizens.

=== European reservoir ===
It has proven difficult to vaccinate a sufficient number of children in Europe to eradicate the disease, because of opposition on philosophical or religious grounds, or fears of side-effects, or because some minority groups are hard to reach, or simply because parents forget to have their children vaccinated. Vaccination is not mandatory in some countries in Europe, in contrast to the United States and many Latin American countries, where children must be vaccinated before they enter school.

== Africa ==
=== Congo ===
In January 2020, the World Health Organization announced that the death toll from the measles outbreak in the Democratic Republic of the Congo had reached 6,000, triple that of Ebola. 310,000 cases have been reported since 2019. US $27.6 million has been spent, but $40 million more is needed.

=== Madagascar ===
In 2019, 1,200 had died of measles in an outbreak in Madagascar.

=== South Africa ===
Beginning in September 2009, Johannesburg, South Africa reported about 48 cases of measles. Soon after the outbreak, the government ordered all children to be vaccinated. Vaccination programs were then initiated in all schools, and parents of young children were advised to have them vaccinated. Many people were not willing to have the vaccination done, as it was believed to be unsafe and ineffective. The Health Department assured the public that their program was indeed safe. Speculation arose as to whether or not new needles were being used. By mid-October, there were at least 940 recorded cases, and four deaths.

By 2020, South Africa eliminated measles outbreaks as there was less than one case per million citizens in the population in 2015, 2016, and 2020.

An outbreak started in September 2022, the strain being genotype D8 - similar to the 2022 outbreak strain in Zimbabwe. By October 2023 there were 1199 confirmed positive tests from 7054 serum samples, with most cases in the Limpopo province.

=== Zimbabwe ===
In April 2022 cases were reported from the village of Makabvepi near the border with Mozambique, with child deaths from families that belonged to the Johane Marange Apostolic Church whose large Easter service and then a Passover celebration spread measles across the country. The church publicly opposed vaccination and is closely aligned with President Emmerson Mnangagwa who attended the Passover gathering. Vaccine hesitancy was amplified by churches discouraging immunization and urging members to rely on prayer and the intercession of pastors instead. As of 6 September 2022, there were more than 6500 reported cases and 704 deaths.

== Americas ==
Indigenous measles was declared to have been eliminated in North, Central, and South America; the last endemic case in the region was reported on November 12, 2002, with only northern Argentina and rural Canada, particularly in Ontario, Quebec, and Alberta, having minor endemic status. Outbreaks are still occurring, however, following importations of measles viruses from other world regions. In June 2006, an outbreak in Boston resulted after a resident became infected in India.

=== Canada ===
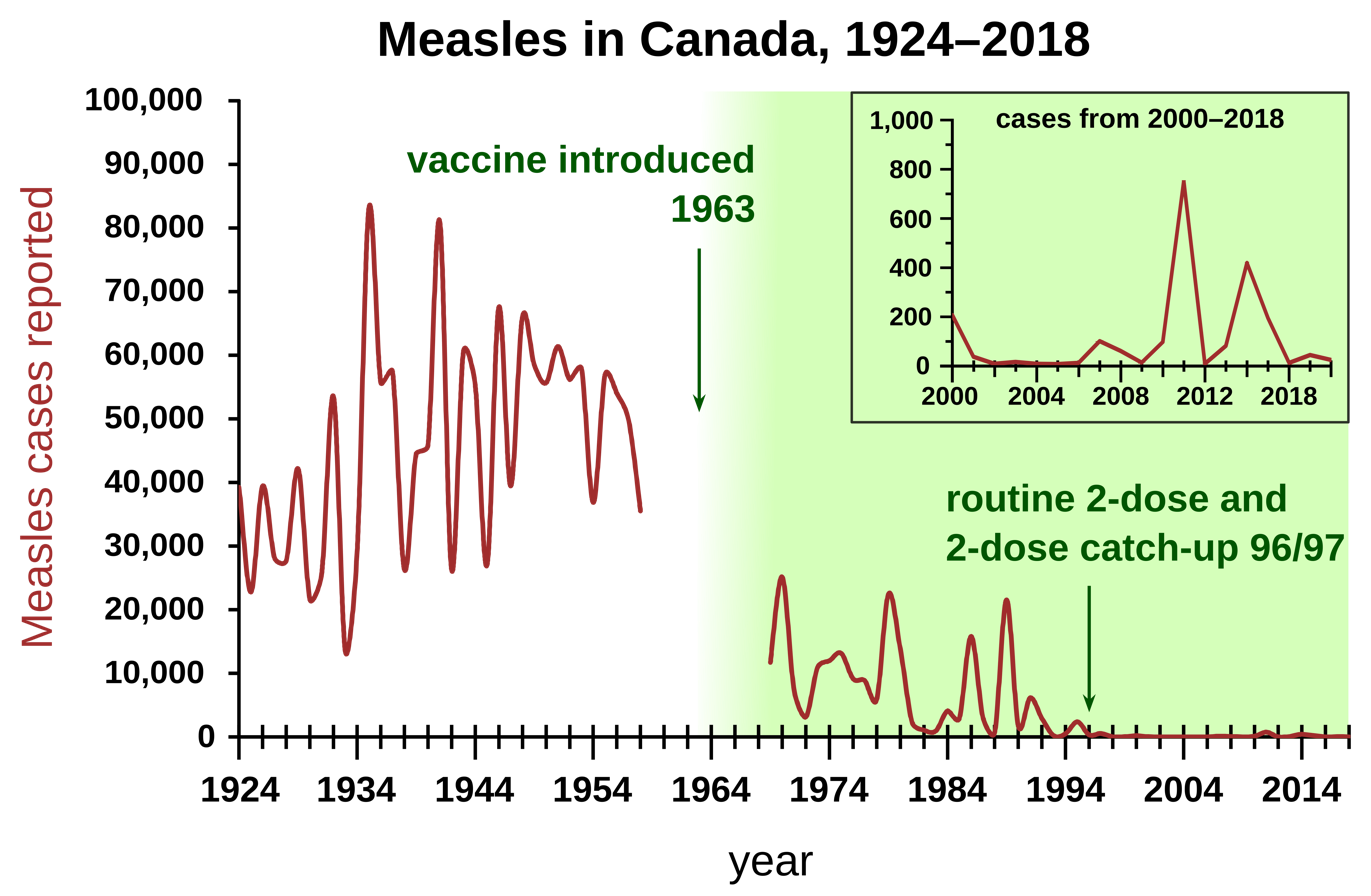
Measles cases reported in Canada before and after introduction of the vaccine, 1924 to 2018. Between 1959 and 1968, measles were not nationally reportable, hence data are missing for this period.

Canadian data since 1924 shows measles outbreaks occurring frequently until the large vaccination campaigns in the 1970s. The 1935 epidemic stands out during this early period, with 83,000 reported cases (770 cases per 100,000 population); the highest number of fatalities occurring in 1926, with 892. Immunization programs became widely spread during the 1970s, with an estimated 85% of the target population receiving one dose of vaccination by the end of the decade. However, the frequent recurrence of significant outbreaks (including 6,178 cases in 1991 alone) showed Canada's 1-dose strategy was lacking, even with provinces requiring immunization for school attendance. Two-dose MMR programs and catch-up campaigns were widely introduced in 1996-1997.

The Canadian government defines endemic measles as a situation where a chain of transmission continues uninterrupted for 12 months. By this standard, Canada has been free of endemic measles since 1998, but sporadic imported outbreaks have continued.

Southern regions of the province of Quebec witnessed a measles outbreak affecting 94 persons in the Spring and summer 2007. The outbreak lasted 25 weeks, included more than one strain of the measles virus and had 12-17 generations of spread.

In 2008, Canada had more than 30 confirmed cases in Ontario in 2008, with more than half reported in Toronto.

In 2011, Quebec experienced the largest outbreak of measles in the Americas since 2002. The outbreak began on 8 January with unvaccinated individuals acquiring the disease whilst traveling to France, a country with high measles incidence, and returning home to Quebec. Public health officials responded to the outbreak by launching a mass vaccination campaign, and on 22 December, the outbreak ended with a total of 776 cases having occurred. 615 cases (79%) had not been vaccinated, including 29 infants too young to receive the vaccine. 11% of cases required hospitalization, and complications occurred in 64 cases (8%), with pneumonia being the most common complication observed (3% of cases). No deaths were reported.

A measles outbreak was declared on 8 March 2014 in regions east of Vancouver in the Fraser Valley area where vaccination rates were known to be low in school and religious groups. A total of 228 cases were confirmed. On March 24, Fraser Health Authority said the outbreak have been contained and confined to the original community.

In May 2024, a child under the age of five in Ontario died of measles, the first case in the province in over a decade. The child was reportedly not vaccinated against the virus, and required hospitalization before his death.

=== Mexico ===
Twenty-five cases of measles were reported in Mexico City on March 18, 2020. The outbreak began in the Reclusario Norte (Northern penitentiary) the previous week. 8,000 vaccines were applied at the penitentiary and 10,000 doses were applied at the other penitentiaries in the city. Eleven children and five adults in the nearby Gustavo A. Madero borough were among the 25 infected.

=== United States ===
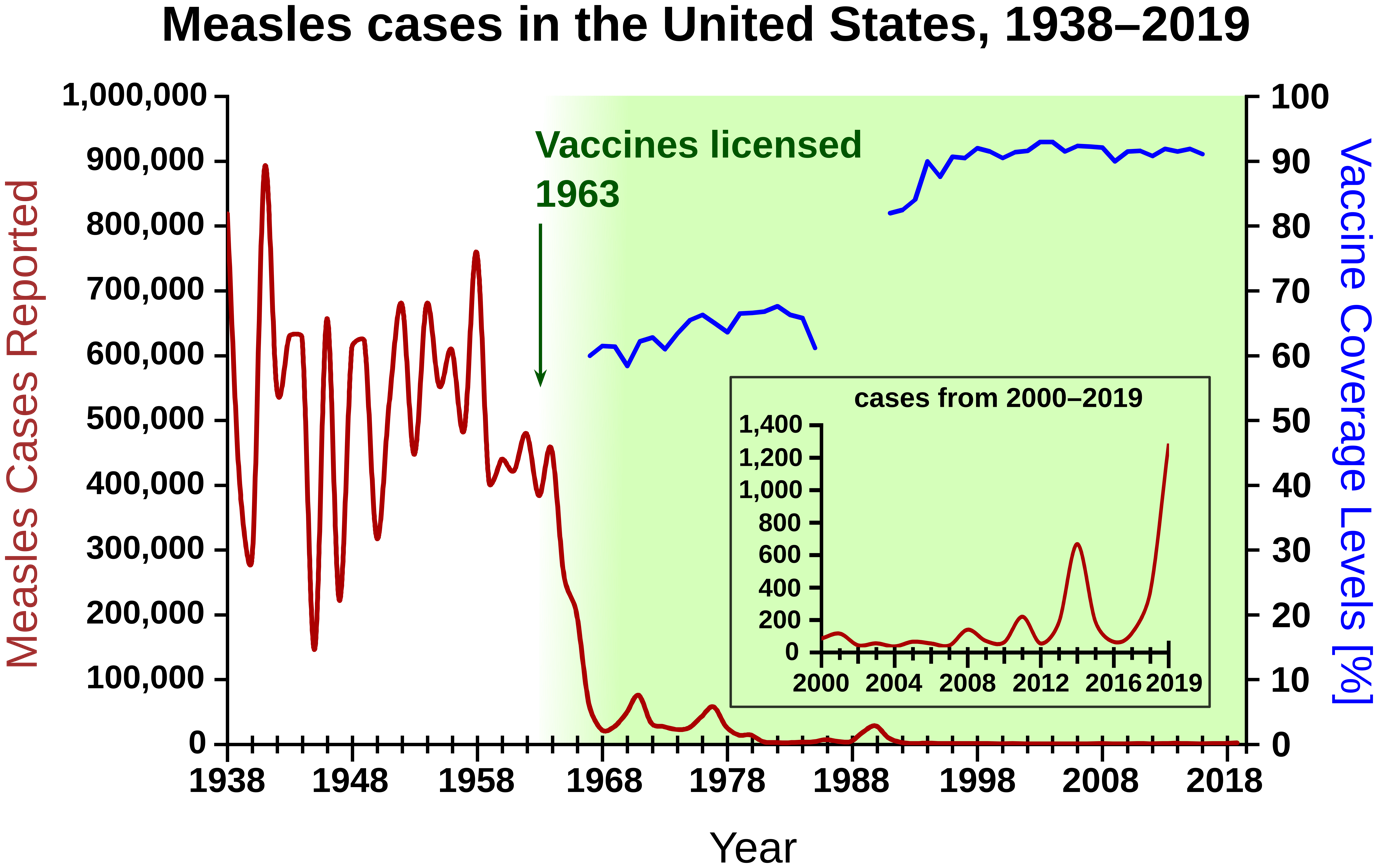
Measles cases in the US 1938–2019, showing the effect of vaccination

Indigenous measles has been declared eliminated in North, Central, and South America; the last endemic case in the region was reported on November 12, 2002. Though measles is considered "eliminated," outbreaks are still occurring following importations of measles viruses from other world regions. In June 2006, an outbreak in Boston resulted after a resident became infected in India, and in October 2007, a Michigan girl who had been vaccinated contracted the disease overseas.

In 1990-91 in the Philadelphia region, over 1400 people contracted measles. The center of this outbreak was traced to Faith Tabernacle Congregation, a Faith Healing church that actively discouraged parishioners from vaccinating their children. A judge issued a court order to forcibly treat children whose parents refused to seek medical care, and nine children were forcibly vaccinated. Nine children eventually died as a result of this outbreak, six of which were members of Faith Tabernacle Congregation or First Century Gospel Church, another faith-healing church in Philadelphia.

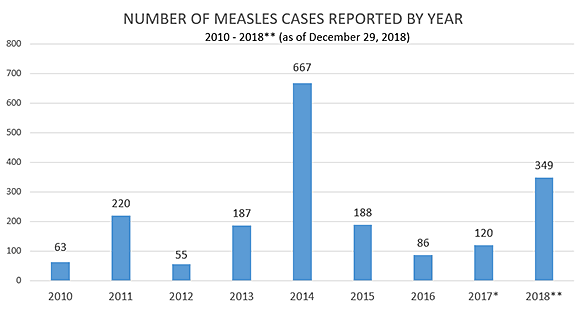
US Measles cases, 2010 to 2018.

Between January 1 and April 25, 2008, a total of 64 confirmed measles cases were preliminarily reported in the United States to the Centers for Disease Control and Prevention, the most reported by this date since 2001, and the highest total number in six years. Of the 64 cases, 54 were associated with importation of measles from other countries into the United States, and 63 of the 64 patients were unvaccinated or had unknown or undocumented vaccination status. By July 9, 2008, a total of 127 cases were reported in 15 states, making it the largest US outbreak since 1997 (when 138 cases were reported). Most of the cases were acquired outside of the United States and affected individuals who had not been vaccinated.

In early 2008 there was an outbreak of measles in San Diego, California. The outbreak is traced to an unvaccinated 7-year-old child who went on a family trip to Europe. The CDC refers to this as an "import-associated outbreak". The final diagnosis included 11 additional cases of measles in unvaccinated children in San Diego. All of the confirmed patients were not vaccinated because they were younger than 1, the minimum age for measles inoculation, or because their parents declined to have them vaccinated. The typical vaccine would be the MMR vaccine. The incident drew attention to the controversy over MMR vaccination. This was San Diego County's first measles outbreak since 1991.

In February 2008 there was an outbreak of measles in Pima County, Arizona. There were 13 laboratory confirmed and 4 probable measles cases, though 22 cases were previously reported. The outbreak started with a visitor from Switzerland and resulted in a public health emergency declaration by Pima County. The last confirmed Pima County case occurred in 1994, and the last outbreak occurred in 1991.

By July 9, 2008, a total of 127 cases were reported in 15 states (including 22 in Arizona), making it the largest U.S. outbreak since 1997 (when 138 cases were reported). Most of the cases were acquired outside of the United States and affected individuals who had not been vaccinated. By July 30, 2008, the number of cases had grown to 131. Of these, about half involved children whose parents rejected vaccination. The 131 cases occurred in seven different outbreaks. There were no deaths, and 15 hospitalizations. Children who were unvaccinated or whose vaccination status was unknown accounted for 122 cases. Some of these were under the age when vaccination is recommended, but in 63 cases, the vaccinations had been refused for religious or philosophical reasons.

On May 24, 2011, the Centers for Disease Control and Prevention reported that the United States has had 118 measles cases so far this year. The 118 cases were reported by 23 states and New York City between Jan 1 and May 20. Of the 118 cases, 105 (89%) were associated with cases abroad and 105 (89%) of the 118 patients had not been vaccinated.

In 2013, at least 20 members of the Eagle Mountain International Church in Newark, Texas were diagnosed with measles after a few members of the congregation traveled abroad on a mission trip and contracted the disease. The church has sponsored several vaccination drives. Senior Pastor Terri Pearsons, who had previously expressed concerns about potential links between the measles vaccine and autism, was encouraging parishioners to get vaccinated. However, she said she still has some concerns about vaccines, particularly for young children with a family history of autism, and where several immunizations are given at the same time. Professor William Schaffner, professor at the Vanderbilt University School of Medicine, described the pastor as "misinformed" and said that young children are among the most vulnerable to measles.

US Measles cases by year
| Year | Reported |
|---|---|
| 2010 | 63 |
| 2011 | 220 |
| 2012 | 55 |
| 2013 | 187 |
| 2014 | 667 |
| 2015 | 188 |
| 2016 | 86 |
| 2017 | 120 |
| 2018 | 375 |
| 2019 | 1282 |
| 2020 | 13 |
| 2021 | 49 |
| 2022 | 121 |
| 2023 | 59 |
| 2024 | 285 |
| 2025 | 2,289 |
Reference:CDC

In February and March 2014, 20 confirmed cases appeared in New York City.

In December 2014, a measles outbreak began at Disneyland in Southern California. At least 173 people have become infected with measles in 21 states, as of May 2015. Health officials say 39 cases have been traced to direct exposure at the park, with 117 infections linked by primary or secondary exposure. Among the 110 California patients, 49 (45%) were unvaccinated; five (5%) had 1 dose of measles-containing vaccine, seven (6%) had 2 doses, one (1%) had 3 doses, 47 (43%) had unknown or undocumented vaccination status, and one (1%) had immunoglobulin G seropositivity documented, which indicates prior vaccination or measles infection at an undetermined time. 12 of the unvaccinated patients were infants too young to be vaccinated.

Medical professionals, such as David Gorski, have criticized physicians and pediatricians in the area who do not adhere to the CDC's recommended vaccination schedule or discourage vaccination, among them Bob Sears and Jay Gordon for reducing vaccination rates and thus weakening herd immunity, and creating a situation in which an outbreak was more likely. California passed a mandatory vaccination law in June 2015.

In January 2015, it was reported that over 70 people who had visited Disneyland or Disney California Adventure between Dec. 15 and Dec. 20 fell ill with measles, with 62 of them residing in California. The total number of cases included five people who had been fully vaccinated against the disease. Between January 1 and 28, 2015, most of the 84 people who were diagnosed with measles were either infected during their visit to Disneyland or by someone who visited the theme park.

In Spring 2015, the death of an immune-suppressed woman in Washington State caused by measles was diagnosed after autopsy. This was the first U.S. measles death since 2012.

In spring 2017, a measles outbreak occurred in Minnesota. As of June 16, 78 cases of measles had been confirmed in the state, 71 were unvaccinated and 65 were Somali-Americans. The outbreak has been attributed to low vaccination rates among Somali-American children, which can be traced back to 2008, when Somali parents expressed concerns about disproportionately high numbers of Somali preschoolers in special education classes who were receiving services for autism spectrum disorder. Around this time, Andrew Wakefield visited Minneapolis, teaming up with vaccine-skeptical groups to raise concerns about the MMR vaccine. Multiple studies have shown no connection between the MMR vaccine and autism.

In January 2019, Washington's Clark County Public Health officials declared a public health emergency due to a measles outbreak. As of February 28, 2019, 65 cases were identified.

In March 2019, a disaster was declared by county authorities and the county health department in Rockland County, New York, over a growing measles outbreak there. Additionally there has been 259 confirmed cases of measles in Brooklyn and Queens, most of which are affecting the Orthodox Jewish community.

In 2019, 1,274 reported measles cases drew concern as this was the largest reported number of cases in the United States since 1992. Cases were mostly unvaccinated individuals. In 2021, cases went down to only 49 reported cases in the United States. In 2022, cases jumped to 121 reported cases. In 2023, cases decreased to 58 reported cases, but the CDC has remarked that they have already had more cases reported in 2024 than the previous year, again citing unvaccinated individuals.

In 2025, a total of 2,289 confirmed measles cases were reported by 45 states and jurisdictions. Of the total cases for the year, 26 cases were reported among international visitors to the United States. There were 48 outbreaks reported in 2025, of which 90% of confirmed cases were associated.

In 2026, 2,371 confirmed measles cases were reported. Of these, 2,355 cases were reported across 45 states and jurisdictions. A total of 16 measles cases were reported among international visitors to the United States.

There have been 37 new outbreaks reported in the United States as of July 30, 2026, and 94% of confirmed cases were outbreak-associated. For comparison, 16 outbreaks were reported during 2024 and 69% of cases were outbreak-associated.

This data shows a substantial increase in measles cases and outbreaks in the United States. Confirmed cases increased from 285 in 2024 to 2,289 in 2025, representing an increase of approximately 703%. By July 20, 2026, 2,371 cases had already been reported, approximately 732% more than in 2024 and 3.6% more than the total reported during all of 2025. Measles outbreaks also increased from 16 in 2024 to 48 in 2025, a 200% increase. By July 30, 2026, 37 outbreaks had already been reported, approximately 131% more than in 2024.

As of July 20, 2026, South Carolina has reported the highest number of measles cases in the United States, with approximately 670 confirmed cases. Utah ranked second with approximately 522 confirmed cases.

=== Venezuela ===
In 2018, Venezuela had 5,525 cases of measles reported, which was 68% of the total cases in the Americas at the time. As of 2020, the Pan America Health Organization reported that the measles outbreak is under control, and have increased vaccination rates in over 9 million children.

== Asia ==
=== Israel ===
Approximately 100 cases of the disease were reported in Israel between August 2007 and May 2008 (in sharp contrast to just some dozen cases the year before). Many children in ultra-Orthodox Jewish communities were affected due to low vaccination coverage.

In 2018 and 2019, Israel suffered a measles outbreak affecting 4,300 citizens.

=== Japan ===
In 2007, a large measles outbreak in Japan caused a number of universities and other institutions to close in an attempt to contain the disease.

=== Philippines ===
In early 2010, there was a serious outbreak of measles in the Philippines with 742 cases, leaving four unvaccinated children dead in the capital city of Manila.

In late 2013, it was reported in the Philippines that 6,497 measles cases occurred which resulted in 23 deaths.

In 2014 the Philippines experienced a large measles outbreak. According to the World Health Organization there were 57,564 suspected cases of measles, including 21,403 confirmed cases, and 110 measles deaths reported in the Philippines from January 1 through December 20, 2014. Most of the cases were among unvaccinated people. A major outbreak was declared on February 6, 2019, with 70 recorded deaths of children, this outbreak was attributed to the "Dengvaxia scare".

== Europe ==
Measles cases in the WHO European region using WHO EpiData View source data.

Despite the highest ever vaccination rate of 90% achieved in 2017 in the European region, number of measles cases tripled the next year reaching 82,596 with 72 of them resulting in death. Almost two thirds of them were registered in Ukraine, where vaccination rates dropped to 31% in 2016.

=== Ukraine ===
Ukraine has had a multiple large outbreaks of measles. In 2001–2002, there were around 25,000 cases and 14 deaths reported. In 2006 with 44,534 reported cases with at least 2 deaths. 13,517 cases were reported in 2012. In 2019 Ukraine reported over 57,000 cases, over half the total reports in the WHO European Region.

Ukraine has one of the world's worst measles epidemics with more than 100,000 cases from 2017 to June 2019, with 16 deaths in 2018. In 2016 only 31% of the population had been immunised with the MMR vaccine. Various reasons are given for the low rate of vaccination including: a distrust of the state in the 1990s, a failure to keep vaccine supplies reliably refrigerated leading to ineffectiveness, a poorly informed medical profession and a high level of vaccine distrust in the wider population. Children are required to be vaccinated before entering the school system, but UNICEF estimates that as many as 30% of vaccination certificates are falsified.

=== Germany ===
Germany has faced repeated outbreaks in the 21st century. 6,037 cases were reported in 2001 with at least two deaths. More than 1,500 cases were reported in 2006. 1,600 cases were reported in an outbreak in 2013. An outbreak in 2015 had more than 1,700 cases had been reported by May 11 with one death.

=== Netherlands ===
In September 2008 an outbreak occurred among anthroposophists' children in the cities of The Hague and Utrecht. Some 90 infections of unvaccinated children were recorded by the Dutch National Institute for Public Health and the Environment (RIVM) by September 29. It was expected the outbreak would spread to the region of the Veluwe, locally known as a bijbelgordel ("Bible Belt") with a large population of unvaccinated children on religious grounds.

In June 2013, another outbreak occurred in the Bible Belt in The Netherlands. According to newspaper Algemeen Dagblad, there were 161 infections, of which 5 infected people were hospitalized critically ill. Two of the hospitalized cases had meningitis, two others had pneumonia and from one of them, the complications are still unknown.

As of 2019, the Netherlands reported over 80 measles cases.

=== United Kingdom ===
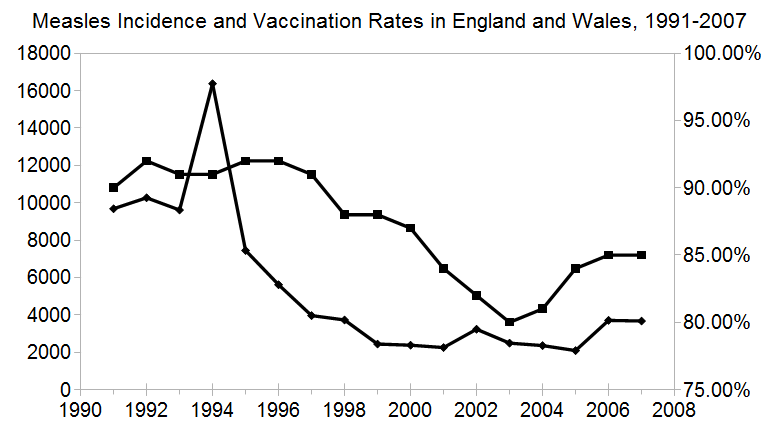
Measles incidence (lower curve) and vaccination rates (upper curve) in England and Wales, 1991–2007.

After the MMR vaccine controversy began, the MMR vaccination compliance dropped sharply in the United Kingdom, from 92% in 1996 to 84% in 2002. In some parts of London, it was as low as 61% in 2003, far below the rate needed to avoid an epidemic of measles. By 2006 coverage for MMR in the UK at 24 months was 85%, lower than the about 94% coverage for other vaccines.

After vaccination rates dropped, the incidence of two of the three diseases increased greatly in the UK. In 1998 there were 56 confirmed cases of measles in the UK; in 2006 there were 449 in the first five months of the year, with the first death since 1992. Cases occurred in inadequately vaccinated children. The age group affected was too old to have received the routine MMR immunizations around the time the paper by Wakefield et al. was published, and too young to have contracted the natural disease as a child, and thus to achieve a herd immunity effect.

With the decline in infection that followed the introduction of the MMR vaccine, these individuals had not been exposed to the disease, but still had no immunity, either natural or vaccine induced. Therefore, as immunization rates declined following the controversy and the disease re-emerged, they were susceptible to infection. Measles cases continued in 2006, at incidence rates 13 times greater than 1998 levels. Two children were severely and permanently injured by measles encephalitis despite undergoing kidney transplantation in London. Disease outbreaks also caused casualties in nearby countries including Ireland.

In 2008, for the first time in 14 years, measles was declared endemic in the UK, meaning that the disease was sustained within the population. This was caused by the preceding decade's low MMR vaccination rates, which created a population of susceptible children who could spread the disease. In May 2008, a British 17-year-old with an underlying immunodeficiency died of measles.

An outbreak centered on the Swansea area of Wales started in November 2012; as of 22 April there have been 886 cases.

In March 2013, an epidemic was declared in Swansea, Wales, UK with 1,219 cases and 88 hospitalizations to date. A 25-year-old male had measles at the time of death and died from giant cell pneumonia caused by the disease. There have been growing concerns that the epidemic could spread to London and infect many more people due to poor MMR uptake, prompting the Department of Health to set up a mass vaccination campaign targeted at one million school children throughout England.

In April 2019 a senior epidemiologist at Public Health England said that confidence in the immunization program was high and that timing, availability and location of appointments were the main barriers to vaccination.

In 2021, the United Kingdom reported 2 total measles cases in the country.

=== Ireland ===
1,500 cases and three deaths were reported in the Irish outbreak of 2000, which occurred as a direct result of decreased vaccination rates following the MMR scare.

=== Italy ===
In 2017, there were 4,991 cases and four deaths, representing almost six-times the number of cases in 2016. The number of cases for 2013 through 2016 were 2211, 1674, 251 and 844.

In 2020 and 2021, Italy reported 4 confirmed cases of measles.

=== Bulgaria ===
Beginning in April 2009 there was a large outbreak of measles in Bulgaria, with 23,791 cases, including 24 deaths, reported up to 28 July 2010. From Bulgaria, the strain was carried to Germany, Turkey, Greece, Macedonia, and other European countries.

=== France ===
Between January 2008 and May 2012, 22,000 measles cases were reported in France. 5,000 patients were hospitalised including 1,023 with severe pneumonia, 27 with encephalitis and/or myelitis, and 10 died. An awareness campaign about MMR vaccination was launched.

=== Portugal ===
Most recent reported cases of measles in Portugal are originally imported from other European countries (United Kingdom, France and Romania), Africa (Angola, South African and Ethiopia) and Asia (China). Since 2004, Portugal reported 22 confirmed cases of measles. Virus isolates from 2005 and 2008 outbreaks belong the genotype D4. Vaccination coverage in Portugal is ≥95% (since 2006) but pockets of reduced immunization coverage (85-94%) still persist in the population.

In 2021-22 Portugal has reported 0 cases of measles.

=== Romania ===
On December 5, 2023, the Romanian Ministry of Health announced in a press communique that there is a measles epidemic in Romania with over 2,000 cases registered. Anti-measles vaccination in Romania is continuing a descending trend, with 72% of the eligible population having received the first dose and 62% the second dose.

=== Sweden ===
The most recent outbreak in Sweden was a small outbreak with a total of 40 cases in August 2026. In the middle of august 2026 3 cases of measles were reported to the Swedish public health agency. All 3 cases were linked to a festival in the town of Urkult in Västernorrland. The outbreak developed into a total of 40 cases where 28 cases could be linked to transmission during the festival. The source of the outbreak was imported from outside the country. On the 14th of October the Swedish public health agency declared the outbreak to be over.

== Oceania ==
=== Australia ===
Fourteen cases have been reported in multiple Australian and New Zealand cities including Melbourne and Auckland in the period between December 7, 2013, and January 3, 2014. The outbreak is believed to have begun at the 2013 World Supremacy Battlegrounds dance festival held in Sydney, Australia.

=== New Zealand ===
Ten cases were reported in Christchurch in July 2009.

An outbreak between 25 May 2011 and 24 July 2012 in the Auckland region had 489 confirmed or probable cases of measles, 82 of which required hospitalisation. The outbreak was started with an unimmunised child becoming infected on a family trip to England, then developing measles back in Auckland.

In June and July 2014, 124 confirmed cases of measles were reported in Hamilton. Eighty percent of persons infected were aged between 10 and 20, and all but four were not immunised. Most of those infected were linked with Fraser High School in the city's west, resulting in the school cancelling all school trips and cultural and sporting events.

In 2019, New Zealand saw its worst outbreak in two decades. As of 5 September 2019, there had been 1,051 reported cases, mainly in Auckland which has seen 877 cases. There were also reported cases in the South Island's Canterbury region, Otago and Southland regions. In response to the epidemic, the Government established a National Health Coordination Centre in Auckland. On 5 September, the United States Department of State and the Centers for Disease Control issued a health travel advisory for US citizens traveling to New Zealand. By 17 September, the number of measles cases had reached 1,327, with 1,108 reported in Auckland. Over 54,000 doses of vaccination had been distributed that month with 52,000 more doses arriving from Belgium on that date.

=== Samoa ===
An outbreak in November 2019 resulted in the deaths of 24 children and one adult from over 2,200 cases as of November 25, 2019. The Health Ministry estimates two-thirds of its 200,000 residents are vaccinated, while UNICEF puts the vaccination rate even lower at 28-40 per cent. The death toll had increased to 39 by November 28, 2019. The death toll reached 53 on December 2. The government had declared a state of emergency on November 15, when schools were closed and children were banned from public gatherings.
