= Kenneth Copeland =

American televangelist (born 1936)

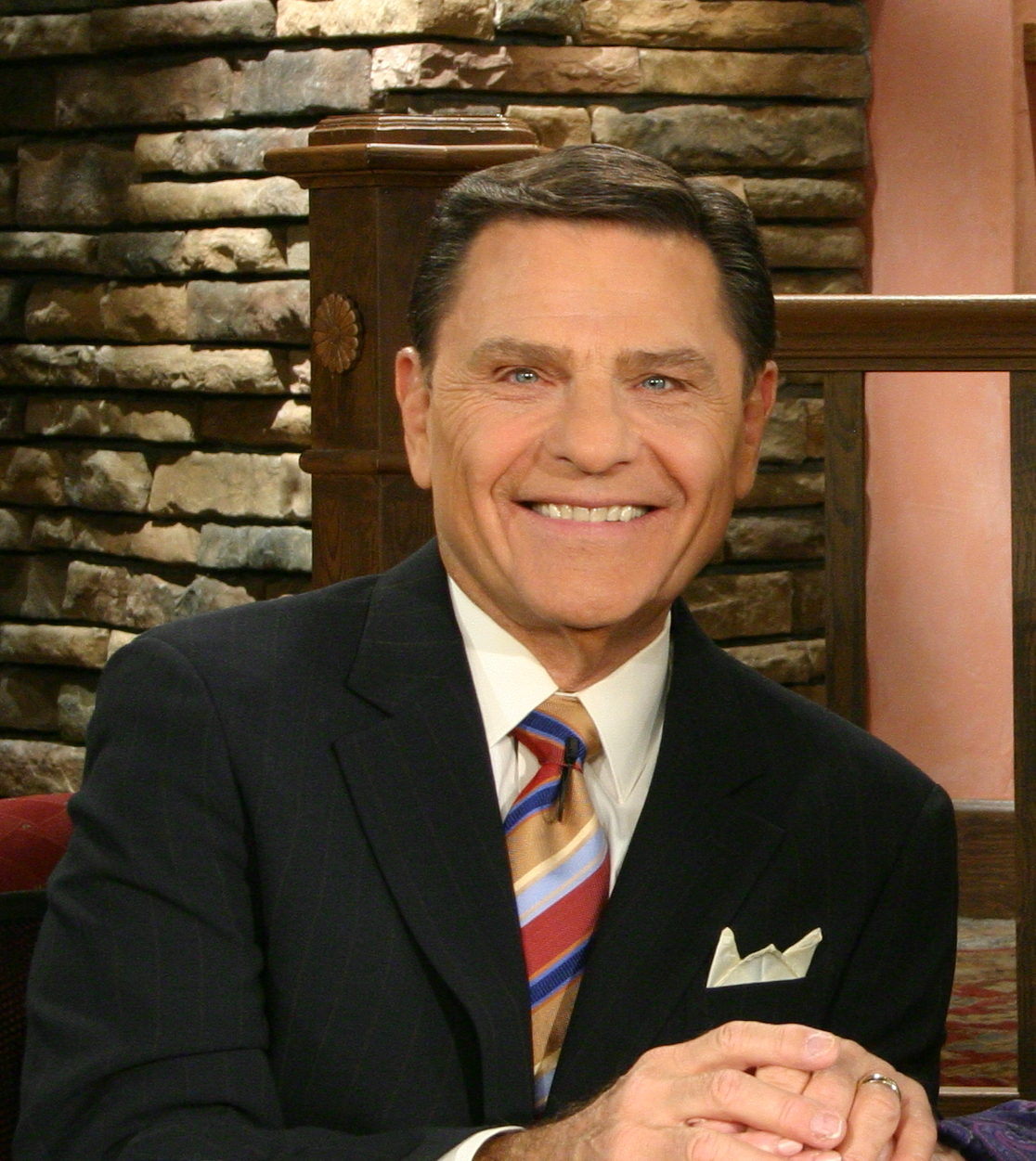
- Copeland on the Believer's Voice of Victory television broadcast in 2011
- Born: Kenneth Max Copeland; December 6, 1936 (age 89); Lubbock, Texas, U.S.
- Occupations: Author; speaker; prosperity gospel preacher; televangelist
- Years active: 1956–present
- Movement: Word of Faith
- Spouses: Ivy Bodiford (m. 1955; div. 1958); Cynthia Davis (m. 1958; div. 1961); Gloria Neece (m. 1963)
- Children: 3
- Website: kcm.org

Kenneth Max Copeland (born December 6, 1936) is an American televangelist associated with the charismatic movement. He is the founder of Eagle Mountain International Church Inc. (EMIC), which is based in Tarrant County, Texas. Copeland has also written several books and other resources, and is known for his broadcast The Believer's Voice of Victory.

Copeland preaches prosperity theology and is part of the Word of Faith movement, which teaches that divine favor is expressed in material and financial blessing, and that giving to ministries unlocks this favor.

== Early life and career ==
Kenneth Max Copeland was born on December 6, 1936, and raised in West Texas, near a United States Army Air Forces airfield. This inspired him to become a pilot.

Copeland was a recording artist on the Imperial Records label during the 1950s, recording a number of singles including "Pledge of Love", which charted in the Billboard Top 40 on April 20, 1957, staying on the charts for 15 weeks and peaking at No. 17.

In the fall of 1967, he enrolled in Oral Roberts University, where he soon became pilot and chauffeur to Oral Roberts.

== Kenneth Copeland Ministries ==
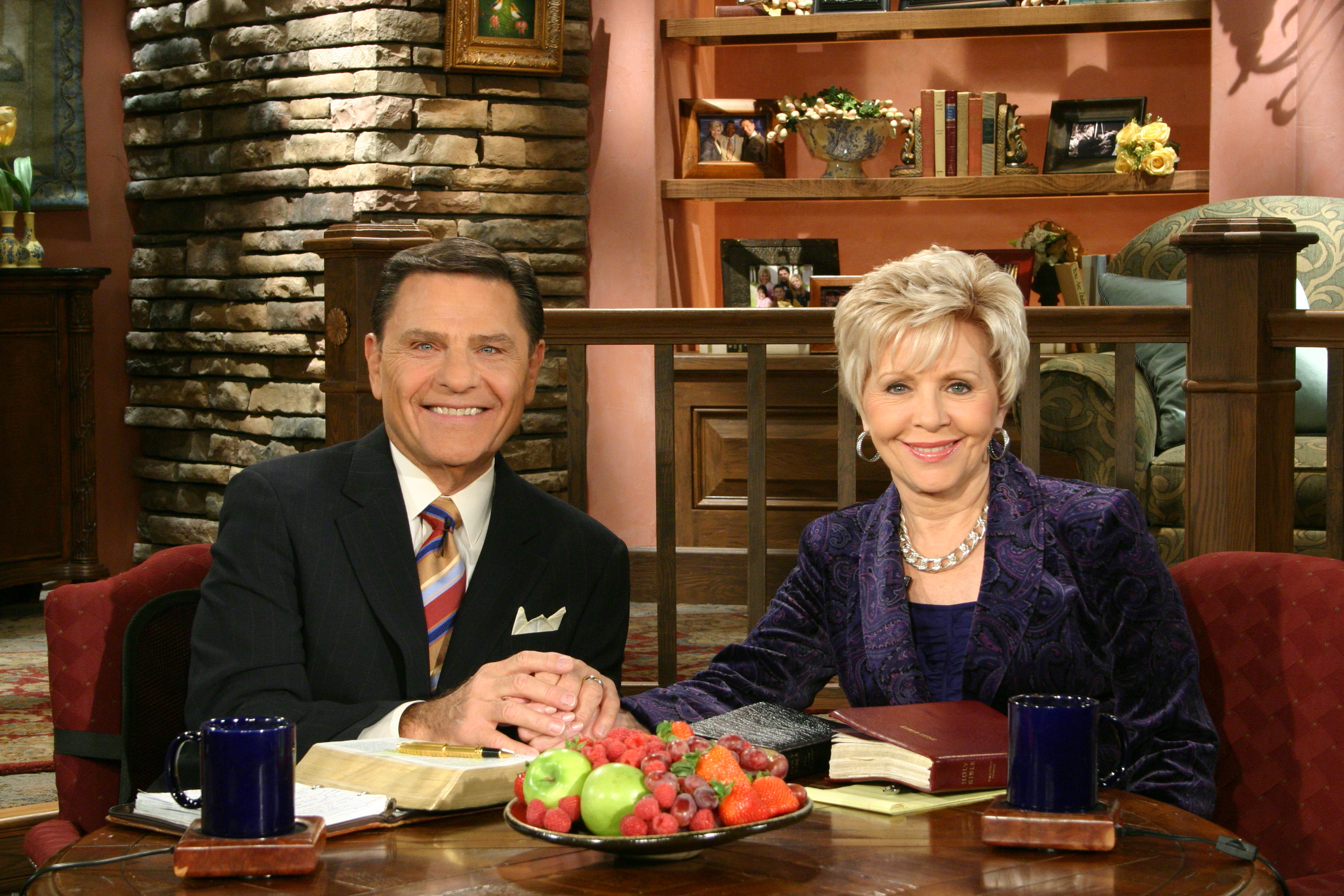
Kenneth and Gloria Copeland

In 1967, after attending Kenneth E. Hagin's Pastor Seminars, Copeland and his wife Gloria founded Kenneth Copeland Ministries (KCM) in Fort Worth, Texas. The ministry's motto is "Jesus is Lord". Kenneth Copeland Ministries has six international offices in Canada, Africa, Asia, Australia, Europe, and Ukraine. He preaches prosperity theology and is part of the Word of Faith movement, which teaches that financial blessing and physical well-being are the will of God for believers, and that material and financial success are a sign of divine favor. This may be unlocked through giving to ministry, and Copeland has written that parishioners will get a "hundredfold" return on their investment through "giving to God" by offering to his ministry.

=== Television and other programming ===
Since 1967, Copeland's ministry has held three-to-six-day conventions across the United States. KCM still holds an annual Southwest Believer's Convention in his hometown of Fort Worth during the first week of August. Kenneth and Gloria Copeland also preach and minister at other conventions and conferences throughout the world.

On May 27, 1971, KCM began a one-hour television program called The Word of Faith. In 1972, a television program called The Prayer Group was launched. This was a half-hour television program aired across the United States.

In 1989, the weekly show The Word of Faith was replaced by a daily series called Believer's Voice of Victory. Mike Huckabee, a 2008 Republican presidential primary candidate, made six appearances on the program.

==== Victory Channel ====
In 2015, KCM launched the Believer's Voice of Victory Network on channel 265 on Dish Network. Believer's Voice of Victory Network was renamed Victory Channel in 2019 and is available over-the-air and on some cable providers. On October 2, 2020, the Believer's Voice of Victory (BVOV) stopped broadcasting on the Trinity Broadcasting Network (TBN). At the start of 2022, it was added on several national cable systems under a new channel lease with Olympusat, which had previously offered Hillsong Channel and Living Faith Network, then Bulldog Shopping Network, on the channel space until the fall of 2025, when the ministry ended those agreements to focus on free streaming venues and satellite.

Pastor Gene Bailey hosts the Victory Channel's popular FlashPoint current-events prophecy program and reaches approximately 11,000 households. FlashPoint commonly features nationally known ministry leaders such as Lance Wallnau and Hank Kunneman; other guests have included Donald Trump, Charlie Kirk, Marjorie Taylor Greene and former Ambassador to Israel David Friedman.

=== Facilities ===
Kenneth Copeland Ministries is located in Fort Worth, Texas, on a 33-acre (13 ha) property that was once Marine Corps Air Station Eagle Mountain Lake (MCAS Eagle Mountain Lake), a United States Marine Corps air base, valued in 2008 at $554,160 (equivalent to $828,670 in 2025) by Tarrant Appraisal District. The site includes the Eagle Mountain International Church, television and radio production facilities, warehouse and distribution facilities, residences for the Copeland family, and Kenneth Copeland Airport. In 2008, approximately 500 people were employed by KCM. Copeland's son John Copeland was the ministry's chief operating officer until his divorce from Marty Copeland in 2018. He remains a consultant to the ministry.

Mike Huckabee rented KCM's facilities for a fundraiser, an action that was criticized by the Trinity Foundation. As a result of the Huckabee appearances, KCM was one of six ministries investigated in the United States Senate inquiry into the tax-exempt status of religious organizations. KCM was one of four that did not co-operate or volunteer to make reforms. The investigation did not conclude the Copelands had done anything wrong.

==== Aviation ====
KCM owns several business jets, including a 1998 Cessna 550 Citation Bravo, which it received from a donor in October 2007 and is used for domestic flights, and a 2005 Cessna 750 Citation X, which it uses for international flights. In 2018, KCM acquired a Gulfstream V that was formerly owned by Tyler Perry, and was restoring a 1962 Beech H-18 Twin, which the ministry plans to use for disaster relief efforts.

KCM has been criticized for its use of private aircraft. KCM promised from 2006 to 2010 to create an aviation relief assistance program called Angel Flight 44, to help Haiti. A spokesperson responded "This was not a specific promise with a timeline attached", and said that the money was spent on airplane repairs. In 2008, the ministry owned five airplanes and continued to purchase more. In February 2007, Copeland was accused of using KCM's Citation X for personal vacations. The Copelands' financial records and a list of KCM's board of directors are not publicly available; the information is held in confidence by the Internal Revenue Service. Responding to media questions, Copeland pointed to an accounting firm's declaration that his jet travel complied with federal tax laws.

In December 2008, KCM's Citation Bravo was denied tax exemption after KCM refused to submit a standardized Texas Comptroller form that some county appraisal districts use to make determinations, which would have required making public the salary of all ministry staff. KCM subsequently filed suit with the Tarrant Appraisal District in January 2009 and its petition to have the aircraft's tax-exempt status restored was granted in March 2010.

KCM has utilized an FAA program that blocks enrolled aircraft on flight tracking websites; in 2010, the flights of five of the ministry's aircraft were kept private, including the Citation X and a North American T-28 Trojan. United States Senator Chuck Grassley has questioned some of the flights taken by these aircraft, including layovers in Maui, Fiji, and Honolulu. The ministries say that the stopovers were for preaching or for allowing pilot rest.

Copeland raised funds for the building of a hangar, upgrading of the runway, and maintenance. In 2015, Copeland, in a broadcast alongside fellow televangelist Jesse Duplantis, defended the use of private jets as a necessary part of their ministries.

As of 2024, Federal Aviation Administration (FAA) records indicated that no aircraft were based at the Kenneth Copeland Airport and that it had a single usable runway; that same year, KCM told the Fort Worth Star-Telegram that it was raising money to resurface the second runway so it could be used again. It was using the former Marine Corps hospital building as a medical clinic for church members.

=== Kenneth Copeland Bible College ===
Kenneth Copeland Bible College (KCBC) is located on the property of Kenneth Copeland Ministries and Eagle Mountain International Church (EMIC). KCBC is an accredited member with Transworld Accrediting Commission International. On August 28, 2003, Kenneth Copeland Bible College opened an extension campus in Langley, British Columbia.

== Personal life ==
Copeland has been married three times. His first marriage was to Ivy Bodiford (July 5, 1937 – June 20, 2022) in October 1955. They had one child, and divorced in 1958. He then married Cynthia Davis in 1958, divorcing in 1961.

Copeland married Gloria Neece (born February 12, 1942) in 1963. They are the parents of John Copeland and Kellie Copeland. Gloria co-hosts the ministry's flagship broadcast, The Believer's Voice of Victory, alongside her husband.

Kellie preaches throughout the United States, as does Copeland's daughter Terri, who also preaches at Eagle Mountain International Church, which is pastored by her husband George Pearsons.

Copeland has amassed significant wealth during his career and has referred to himself as a "very wealthy man". The Houston Chronicle referred to him as the wealthiest pastor in America, allegedly having a net worth of $750 million in 2021. As of 2024, Copeland's net worth was estimated to be $300 million. Copeland's use of private jets, luxury cars and lavish houses has been widely criticized, having been featured on a 2015 episode of Last Week Tonight with John Oliver where John Oliver criticized the Copelands for using tax laws to live in a $6.3 million mansion as the parsonage allowance for their home is not subject to income taxes, for using church donations to buy a $20 million jet that was used for trips to a ski resort and a private game ranch, and for promotion of healing through faith and skepticism of medicine.

In April 2026, Copeland appeared on a podcast hosted by Bryce Crawford, an Evangelical social media influencer. Copeland spoke about his upbringing, the growth of his ministry, and the topic of prosperity gospel. Prior to this, Copeland had not participated in a scheduled sit-down interview in over fifteen years.

=== Politics ===
Copeland and KCM have been public and vocal supporters of Israel for several decades. On August 17, 2022, the President of Israel, Isaac Herzog, called and personally thanked Copeland and KCM for their support of Ukrainian and Russian Jews. In 2020 he was listed by the Israel Allies Foundation as one of the top supporters of Israel along with Paula White, John Hagee, Mike Huckabee, and other Christian leaders. Copeland and other Christian leaders such as Greg Laurie and John Hagee have received criticism for their support of Israel. Copeland has previously drawn criticism for his comments on the Joe Biden presidency.

==== Donald Trump advisory board ====
Copeland sat on the evangelical executive advisory board that Donald Trump assembled during his campaign for the presidency. Appointment to the board did not require endorsement of his bid for the presidency, and Copeland clarified that he did not endorse Trump at the time. Before the 2016 election, Copeland said that Christians who did not vote for Trump would be guilty of murder, referring to the pro-choice stance of Hillary Clinton. After a state dinner at the White House that Copeland attended, he stated in an interview that Trump was "led by the Spirit of God", and that his most important legacy as president would be the appointments of conservative judges.

On November 5, 2022, Copeland spoke at a Donald Trump rally in Latrobe, Pennsylvania, stating that Trump is the only president he has ever seen wear the red, white, and blue in office. During the 2024 Southwest Believers' Convention in Fort Worth, Texas, Copeland told the thousands in attendance and online that voting is a sacred trust. His involvement in politics as a nationally prominent ministry leader has drawn both praise and criticism.

On April 16, 2025, Copeland took part in an invitation-only White House Easter Dinner, hosted by the White House Faith Office. Other notable leaders at the dinner included Franklin Graham, Jentezen Franklin, Alveda King, Greg Laurie, and Paula White.

=== Immunization ===
In 2013, a measles outbreak with 25 confirmed cases in Tarrant County, Texas, was attributed in the press to anti-vaccination sentiments expressed by members of the Copeland Ministries. The church denied making any such statements and urged members to get vaccinations, even offering free immunizations through the church itself. Pastor Terri Copeland Pearsons, who is Kenneth Copeland's daughter, offered free vaccination clinics and advised those who did not attend one of the clinics to quarantine themselves at home for two weeks. In a statement on the church website, Pearsons said she was not against immunizations, but also raised concerns about them.

Some people think I am against immunizations, but that is not true, vaccinations help cut the mortality rate enormously. I believe it is wrong to be against vaccinations. The concerns we have had are primarily with very young children who have family history of autism and with bundling too many immunizations at one time. There is no indication of the autism connection with vaccinations in older children. Furthermore, the new MMR vaccination is without thimerosal (mercury), which has also been a concern to many.

During the COVID-19 pandemic, Copeland argued that pastors should not cancel services, and repeatedly said the pandemic had ended or would end soon. On March 29, 2020, in a televised sermon, Copeland "executed judgment" on COVID-19. He claimed that it was "finished" and "over" and that the US was now "healed and well again". In another sermon shortly thereafter, he claimed to destroy the virus with the "wind of God". He urged followers to continue to give tithes to his ministry even if they had lost their jobs through economic hardship brought about by the pandemic.

On August 3–8, 2020, the Kenneth Copeland Ministries hosted the Southwest Believers' Conference at the Fort Worth Convention Center in Fort Worth, Texas, despite restrictions on social gatherings to limit the spread of the pandemic. Local leaders criticized the event, attended by hundreds of people, but were unable to enforce public health restrictions, because religious gatherings were exempt under Governor Greg Abbott's executive orders.

== Selected bibliography ==
- From Faith to Faith: A Daily Guide to Victory. 1991. ISBN 978-0-88114-843-5
- A Ceremony of Marriage. 2012. ISBN 978-0-938458-15-9
- The Power of the Tongue. 2012. ISBN 978-1-57562-113-5
- Blessed to Be a Blessing: Understanding True, Biblical Prosperity. 2012. ISBN 978-1-60463-016-9
- Raising Children Without Fear. 2012. ISBN 978-1-60683-899-0
- Six Steps to Excellence in Ministry. 2012. ISBN 978-1-57562-104-3
- Pursuit of His Presence: Daily Devotions to Strengthen Your Walk With God 2012. ISBN 978-1-57562-435-8
- A House Not Divided: Defeating the Spirit of Division. 2016. ISBN 978-1-60463-280-4
- God, the Covenant and the Contradiction: Accessing God's Promises of Healing, Peace and Provision. 2023. ISBN 978-1-60463-508-9

== See also ==
- Ulf Ekman – Swedish pastor
- Tony Palmer – South African Protestant bishop
