= 1990–1991 Philadelphia measles outbreak =

Disease outbreak in Pennsylvania, United States

- Disease: Measles
- Location: Philadelphia, Pennsylvania
- Confirmed cases: 1,400+
- Deaths: 9

The 1990–1991 Philadelphia measles outbreak was a medical event in and around Philadelphia, Pennsylvania, in which over 1,400 people, mostly children, became sick with measles, and nine children died. There were two epicenters for this outbreak within the area: The Faith Tabernacle Congregation and the First Century Gospel Church. Both churches discouraged the use of not only vaccinations, but also all other forms of medical treatment, instead relying solely on faith healing. Following an investigation into the first death from the outbreak, a court order was obtained to forcibly treat and vaccinate children whose parents would not agree to seeking medical care.

== History ==
Measles was likely imported into Philadelphia by a teenager who had visited Spain and later attended an April 1989 R.E.M. concert at the Philadelphia Spectrum arena. Other cases soon followed.

The formally defined outbreak began in October 1990, but the bulk of incidents of illness, and all of the related deaths and responses to them, occurred in 1991. From November 4, 1990, to March 24, 1991, 486 cases and 6 measles-associated deaths were reported to the Philadelphia Health Department from members of the two fundamentalist church communities, Faith Tabernacle Congregation and the First Century Gospel Church. The two churches promoted "a reliance on prayer, not medical care, to cure disease". By June 1991, an additional 938 measles cases and three deaths from outside the two churches were reported to the department. During this period, "the University of Pennsylvania also reported seven cases of measles among its students". All 9 deaths were among children.

In February 1991, it was reported that "Health workers are now going to the homes of all students in a frantic effort to monitor their conditions to prevent further deaths", and that local officials were "prepared to seek court orders to force the families to accept medical care if the children are in serious condition". Later analysis noted that "although measles is normally fatal in about 1 of every 300 cases, the fatality rate in Philadelphia was much higher, because only 1 child in the congregations received treatment for pneumonia and encephalitis among the children".

Dr. Paul Offit, director of the Vaccine Education Center at the Children's Hospital of Philadelphia, noted that forced vaccination was used in response to the outbreak. With respect to the parents who had initially refused vaccination, Offit said: "They were a peaceful lot. Once it was the law of the city, they realized it and they were pretty placid about it".

== See also ==
- Philadelphia Liberty Loans Parade
- COVID-19 pandemic in Philadelphia
- Followers of Christ
- 2026 Pennsylvania measles outbreak
