= Philadelphia Liberty Loans Parade =

1918 parade that spread influenza

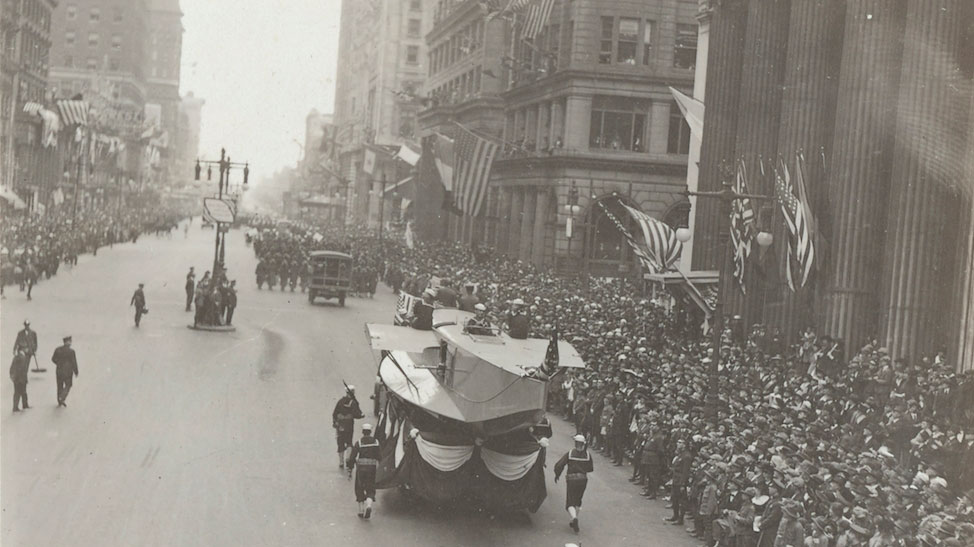
- The parade heading down Broad Street
- Disease: Influenza
- Pathogen: H1N1 influenza A virus
- Location: Philadelphia, Pennsylvania
- Date: September 28, 1918
- Confirmed cases: 47,000
- Deaths: 12,000

The Philadelphia Liberty Loans Parade was a parade in Philadelphia, Pennsylvania, on September 28, 1918, organized to promote government bonds that helped pay for the needs of Allied troops in World War I. More than 200,000 Philadelphians attended the parade, which led to one of the largest outbreaks of the Spanish flu in the United States. It has since been declared the deadliest parade in American history.

== Background ==
The Spanish flu first hit Philadelphia, through the Philadelphia Navy Yard, on September 19, 1918, from sailors who were returning from Europe.

The city of Philadelphia was in charge of raising $259 million for war time efforts and saw the parade as a way to raise those funds.

City officials projected that the parade would draw only around 10,000 spectators. Following news of the disease reaching Philadelphia, many local physicians were wary of the dangers of holding the parade. However, Dr. Wilmer Krusen, the director of Philadelphia's Department of Health and Charities, allowed the parade to be held.

== The parade ==
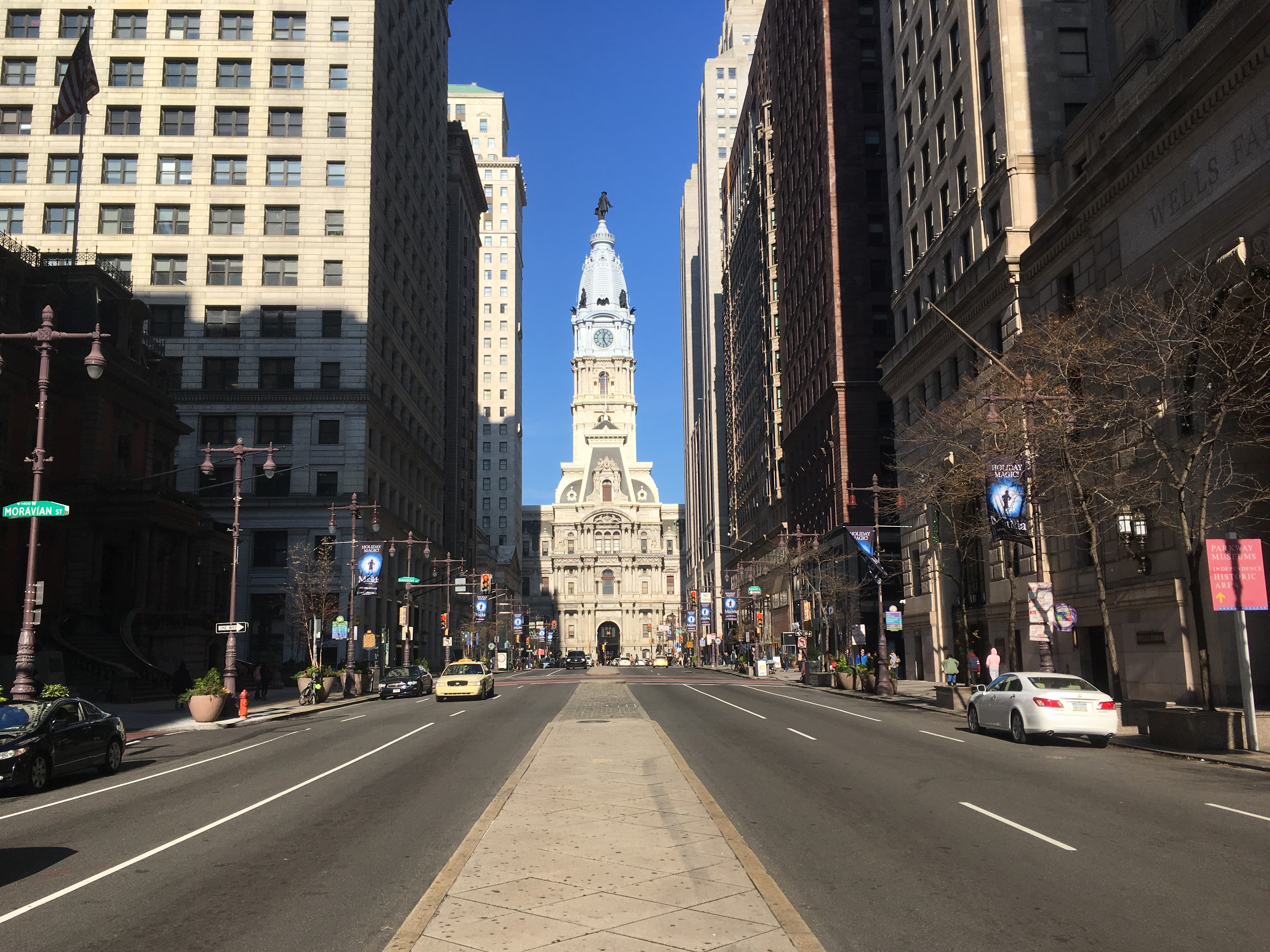
Broad Street, the location of the Philadelphia Liberty Loans Parade

Only nine days after the Spanish flu had arrived in Philadelphia, more than 200,000 Philadelphians (20 times greater than the projected attendance) flocked to see the parade. At the time, it was the largest parade in Philadelphia's history.

The parade, which was 2 miles long, took place on Broad Street and featured four horse-drawn howitzers, floats, marching bands led by John Philip Sousa. Many World War I veterans along with Boy Scouts were in the parade and rode through the crowds.

== Aftermath ==
After the parade was over, the evening bulletin of The Philadelphia Inquirer described the parade as "the first premonition of – victory" and as "a great day in Philadelphia."

Twenty-four hours after the parade had ended, 118 Philadelphians were described as coming down with "a mysterious, deadly influenza." Two days later, Dr. Wilmer Krusen concluded that the Spanish flu was now present in the civilian population. One day after this announcement, every bed in Philadelphia's 31 hospitals was filled. One week later, 4,500 Philadelphians were declared dead of the Spanish flu and 47,000 people were infected.

On October 3, the outbreak of the Spanish flu in Philadelphia had gotten so bad that the city had to be essentially shut down. Schools, churches, bars and theaters were all required to be closed. Many large gatherings in Philadelphia including the Liberty Crusade parade at the Academy of Music and a Liberty Loan meeting with former US President William Howard Taft were canceled.

In response to the outbreak, Klumer requested that the US Army stop drafting doctors in Philadelphia, allocate funds to hire more medical professionals and mobilize the sanitation department to clean the city and remove bodies from the street. Both retired doctors and medical students were used to treat the influx of ill Philadelphians. The Archdiocese of Philadelphia assisted these efforts by sending nuns to hospitals to serve as nurses and by sending priests and seminary students to homes to collect bodies and build graves. Students at Bryn Mawr College, a women's college 11 miles from Philadelphia, opened the Lancaster Inn to treat patients.

Many makeshift hospitals were created throughout Philadelphia. Still, hospitals were unable to treat every infected patient, especially because much of Philadelphia's medical staff was serving the United States overseas in World War I.

The city of Philadelphia had too many deaths and not enough morticians. More than 1,000 bodies lay unburied, which forced the coroner of Philadelphia, William R. Knight Jr., to urge those who were healthy to serve as gravediggers. Many Philadelphians were unable to hire morticians and were forced to bury their dead family members on their own. Notably, Rabbi I. Rosenfeld was forced to build a casket and bury his son, Jack.

Pennsylvania State Senator Edwin H. Vare described the situation in South Philadelphia as the "worst" he could remember. Many doctors were overworked and pharmacies were running short on drugs.

Following the closure of Philadelphia, many people went to Camden, New Jersey, to go to bars. Camden then closed its bars to prevent spread of the influenza.

On November 11, 1918, Philadelphians once again gathered on Broad Street, but this time to celebrate Armistice Day. By then, the disease was on the decline in Philadelphia.

Following the outbreak, the Philadelphia Department of Public Health was officially reorganized.

No memorial to the more than 17,000 Philadelphians that were killed by the Spanish flu exists in the city of Philadelphia today. However, in 2019, the Mütter Museum opened an exhibition called "Spit Spreads Death: The Influenza Pandemic of 1918–19 in Philadelphia." It aims to raise public awareness of the Spanish flu pandemic of 1918 and its impact upon Philadelphia.

Today, The Center for Disease Control's Division of Global Migration and Quarantine uses the Philadelphia Liberty Loans Parade as an example of how not to handle a pandemic.

== See also ==
- COVID-19 pandemic in Philadelphia
- 1990–1991 Philadelphia measles outbreak
- 2020 Sturgis Motorcycle Rally
