= Eagle Mountain International Church =

Church in Texas, United States

Coordinates: 32°59′26″N 97°28′58″W

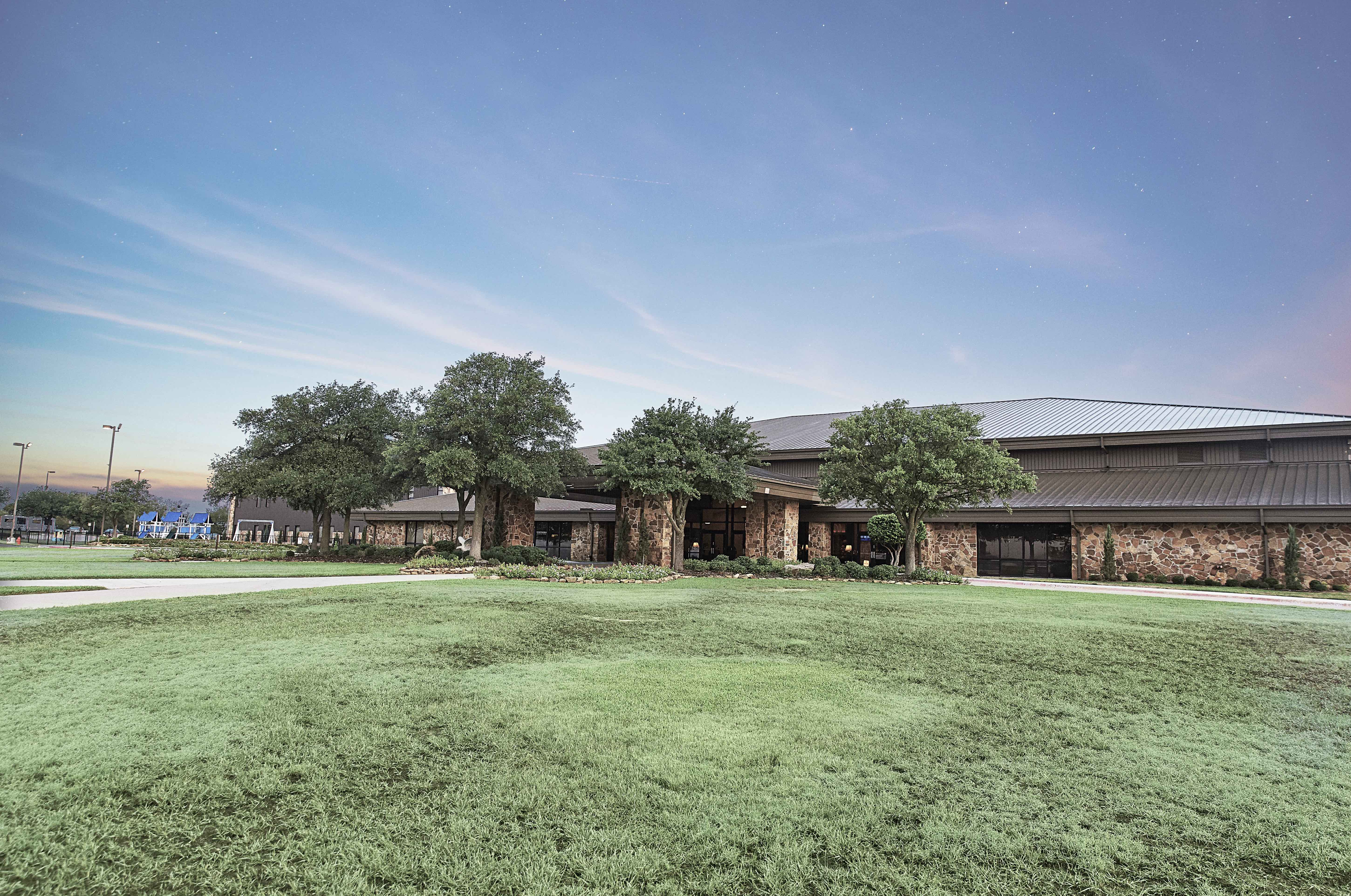
- Eagle Mountain International Church Building
- Formation: 1986
- Headquarters: 14355 Morris Dido Newark Rd, Newark, TX 76071
- Senior Pastor: George Pearsons
- Senior Pastor: Terri Copeland Pearsons
- Affiliations: Word of Faith
- Website: www.emic.org

Eagle Mountain International Church is an evangelical nondenominational church in Newark, Tarrant County, Texas in the United States. It was founded in 1986 by the evangelist Kenneth Copeland, and the senior pastors are George and Terri Copeland Pearsons, Copeland's son-in-law and daughter.

== History ==
The church was founded in 1986 by Kenneth Copeland as Eagle Mountain Church. In 1993, the church was renamed to Eagle Mountain International Church and in 1998, following rapid growth, moved to its current location in Fort Worth, Texas, on a 33-acre property that was once the Marine Corps Air Station Eagle Mountain Lake (MCAS Eagle Mountain Lake), a United States Marine Corps air station. The station's airfield is now an airport, run by Kenneth Copeland Ministries as Kenneth Copeland Airport.

The church broadcasts internationally through Kenneth Copeland Ministries and the Victory Channel. Weekly services are broadcast online and on the Victory Channel. The church also operates a private Bible college called Kenneth Copeland Bible College. The church ministers to the community through its nursing home ministry, hospital ministry, prison ministry, and ministry to military families.

The church has hosted many guest speakers such as Heidi Baker of Iris Global, Jesse Duplantis, and Rick Renner.

Eagle Mountain International Church owns Kenneth Copeland's house. In 2021 the Houston Chronicle reported that the house, valued at $7 million, qualified for tax-free status under a Texas statute that classifies the house as a parsonage.

During the 2022 Russia invasion of Ukraine, Eagle Mountain International Church donated $6.7 million to bring Ukrainian Jewish refugees to Israel by partnering with Keren Hayesod–UIA (United Israel Appeal), and the Jewish Agency for Israel.

In June 2022, EMIC was one of six large Dallas/Fort Worth Churches along with Gateway Church, Fellowship Church, and Prestonwood Baptist Church that celebrated the ending of Roe v Wade.

On October 7, 2023, EMIC hosted a special prayer meeting for Israel after the news of the Hamas attack on Israel broke globally. EMIC has a history of ministry in and for Israel.
