= Faith Tabernacle Congregation =

Fundamentalist Christian Church

- Location: Philadelphia
- Country: United States of America
- Denomination: Non-denominational

History
- Founded: 1897
- Founder: John Wesley Ankins

Faith Tabernacle Congregation is a Christian Fundamentalist non-denominational church based in Philadelphia. The church was started in 1897 as an off-shoot of John Alexander Dowie's faith-healing ministry. Faith Tabernacle Congregation has been the subject of controversy due to its belief in faith healing and rejection of modern medicine. It was prominently involved in the 1990-91 Philadelphia measles outbreak.

== Origin ==
In 1896, Jacob Wilhide established a divine healing ministry in Philadelphia. He aimed to spread John Alexander Dowie's faith healing ministry and establish a divine healing church. This church was not officially associated with Dowie's Christian Catholic Church, but Dowie later integrated Wilhide's Philadelphia Ministry into his own church.

John Wesley Ankins was a member of Wilhide's faith healing mission and was one of the first people baptized into it. In 1897, Ankins established his own separate meeting. He called this Gospel Mission and associated himself with Wilhide's mission in 1898. However, by 1899 Ankins had separated his own mission from Wilhide and Dowie's.

In 1904, Ankins's Gospel Mission purchased the church building that it had been using for the past seven years and renamed itself to Faith Tabernacle Congregation. In 1907, Faith Tabernacle opened a healing home, modeled after those of the Christian Catholic Church.

Faith Tabernacle Congregation gathered new members through distributing free literature. The primary publications were entitled Sword of the Spirit and Leaves of Healing. Correspondence was also published internationally, which led to the formation of branches of Faith Tabernacle Congregation in Nigeria and Ghana.

== Beliefs ==
Faith Tabernacle follows a fundamentalist interpretation of the bible. Most notably, the church holds a literal belief in praying to heal the sick and completely rejects medical treatment. This includes prohibition of vaccination, glasses, hearing aids, and over-the-counter painkillers. Faith Tabernacle Congregation also prohibits drinking alcohol, smoking cigarettes, and premarital sex. Women are forbidden to wear pants or revealing clothing and are expected to be subservient to their husbands. The congregation preaches against associating with members not in the church, which leads to members who leave the church being shunned. Some former members have called Faith Tabernacle Congregation a cult.

== 1990–1991 Philadelphia measles outbreak ==
Faith Tabernacle Congregation gained national attention during the 1990-91 measles outbreak in Philadelphia. The outbreak was declared in October 1990. On January 16, 1991, the Philadelphia Health Commission received an anonymous call detailing the caller's granddaughter who was sick with measles. The caller believed that measles was spreading at Faith Tabernacle School, a private school for children of church members.

On February 7, a 9-year-old Faith Tabernacle School Student died of measles. The Philadelphia Health Commissioner, Dr. Robert Ross, asked Pastor Charles Reinert to vaccinate Faith Tabernacle School Students. He refused, citing a belief in prayer to heal the sick, but did agree to give Ross addresses and phone numbers of members of the church. The commissioner started calling members of the church and asked them to report sick children. However, a child from one of the families Ross had called died a few days after he had called them. Due to the refusal of members of the church to report sick children, Commissioner Ross obtained a court order allowing him to compel medical treatment for sick children against their parents' will and to compel vaccinations for children.

Out of the 9 children that died in the outbreak, 6 of them were either members of Faith Tabernacle Congregation or First Century Gospel Church, an off-shoot church in Philadelphia with similar faith-healing beliefs. 438 of the 1,424 reported measles cases were among members of Faith Tabernacle Congregation and First Century Gospel Church. Members of the two churches were roughly 1,000 times more likely to catch the disease than non-members and roughly 4 times more likely to die from the disease than non-members.
