= COVID-19 pandemic in Philadelphia =

Ongoing COVID-19 viral pandemic in Philadelphia, Pennsylvania

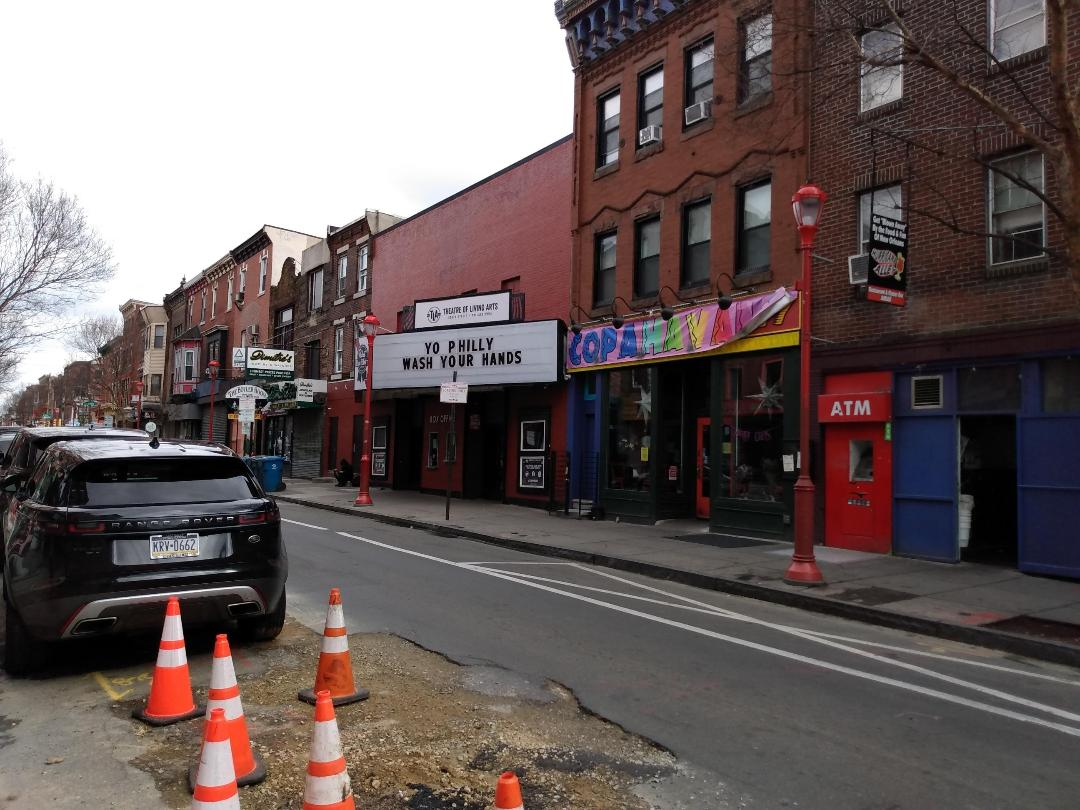
- The TLA on March 17, 2020 during the City of Philadelphia's shutdown during the COVID-19 pandemic
- Disease: COVID-19
- Pathogen: SARS-CoV-2
- Location: Philadelphia
- Date: March 10, 2020 – April 27, 2022
- Confirmed cases: 1,414,430 (Pennsylvania); 189,971 (Philadelphia)
- Severe cases: 18,792 (hospitalizations)
- Deaths: 4,103 (confirmed)

Government website
- www.health.pa.gov/topics/disease/coronavirus/Pages/Cases.aspx

The first case of COVID-19 was confirmed in Philadelphia, Pennsylvania, on March 10, 2020. According to the Philadelphia Department of Public Health, there have been 189,971 confirmed infections and 4,103 confirmed deaths from COVID-19 in the city.

== Timeline ==
The first case of COVID-19 in Philadelphia was announced on March 10, 2020. The infected person was confirmed to be an adult who had exposure to previously confirmed cases of the COVID-19. The city's initial response was not to cancel all large scale events, but instead to recommend that "residents consider not attending large public gatherings with more than 5,000 people". Managing Director Brian Abernathy stated "Obviously this is a difficult situation and we certainly recognize that many businesses and individuals rely on these sorts of events for their livelihood, but we do so out of an abundance of caution. This also impacts our sports teams, both professional, collegiate and even high school. It is simply far more important at this point in time to keep residents and visitors out of large crowds of that size".

On March 17, 2020, there were 96 cases in the state of Pennsylvania, more than half of which were in the Philadelphia area, with Montgomery County holding the highest number. As daily cases began to rapidly increase, Mayor Jim Kenney and Dr. Thomas A. Farley, Health Commissioner of the City of Philadelphia, issued a stay-at-home order beginning at 8 a.m. on March 23, 2020. Secretary of Health for the Commonwealth of Pennsylvania and Professor of Pediatrics and Psychiatry at the Penn State, Rachel Levine, led the state's early response to the outbreak. On March 28, 2020, Governor Tom Wolf announced 533 new cases, bringing the statewide total to 2,751. The highest rise in cases was in Philadelphia County.

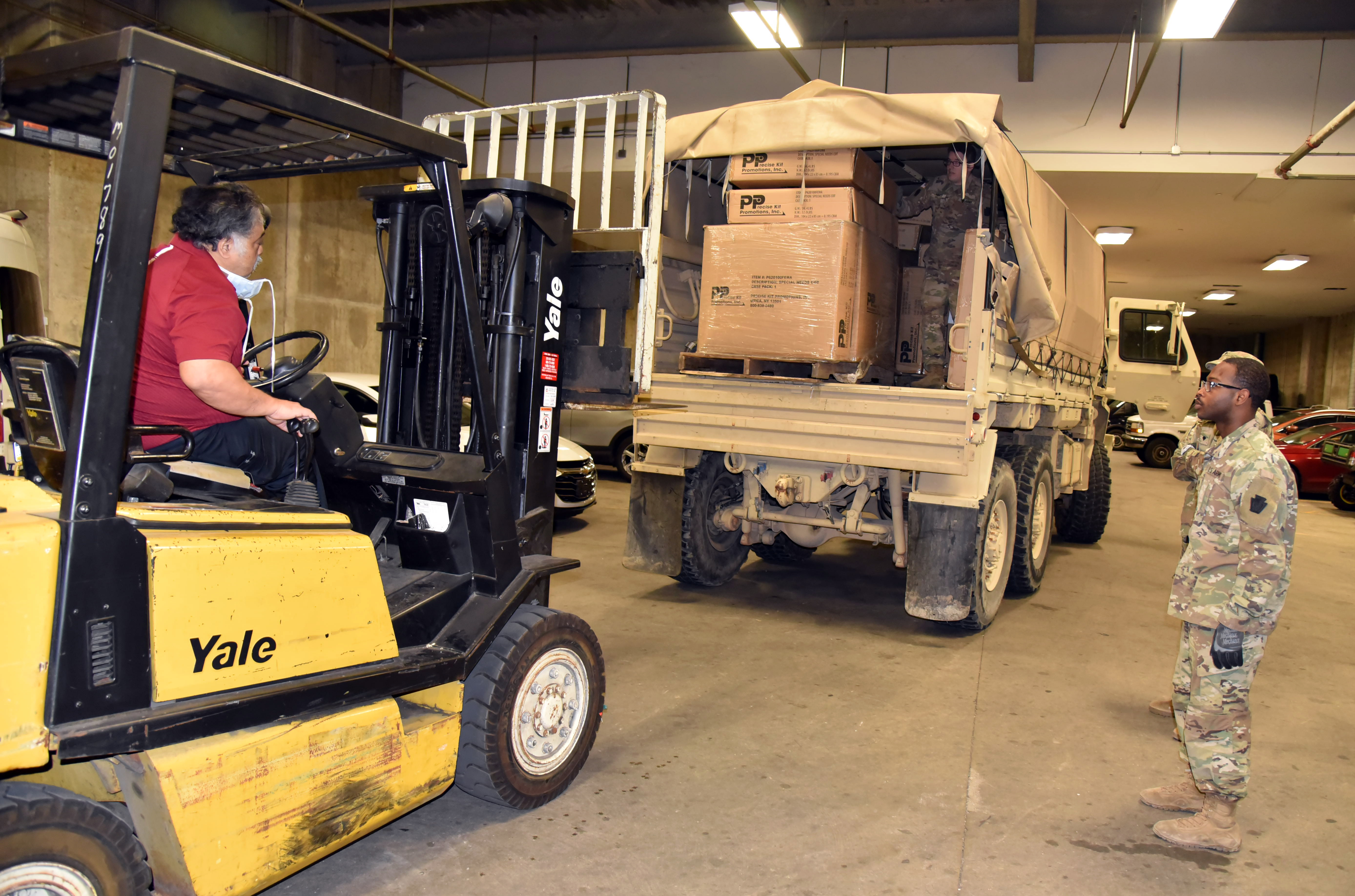
The Pennsylvania National Guard delivering cots to a field hospital at the Liacouras Center

In March 2020, the Liacouras Center at Temple University was transformed into a field hospital with 200 beds arranged on the court in anticipation of a surge in need due to the pandemic and shortages in city hospitals. At the end of April 2020, operations of the field hospital began winding down as the rate of new COVID-19 cases in Philadelphia began to decline.

On April 3, 2020, Governor Wolf asked Pennsylvanians to wear cloth face coverings in public. Philadelphia reduced recycling pickup to every two weeks due to staff shortages. By April 10, 2020, Philadelphia had reported 5,793 coronavirus cases and 137 deaths. A passenger was forced off a SEPTA bus for not wearing a mask. Levine said that "approximately 45 percent of hospital beds, 38 percent of intensive care unit beds and nearly 70 percent of ventilators remained available for use" as of April 10, 2020. Center City is assisting residents over 50 and health care workers who are displaying symptoms consistent with COVID-19.

On the evening of April 8, 2020, during a White House COVID-19 press briefing, Vice President Mike Pence and Coronavirus Response Coordinator Dr. Birx warned that Philadelphia may soon become one of the outbreak's next hotspots. One week later, on April 15, 2020, Philadelphia reported 603 new cases, its highest daily count (during the first wave). Two days later, on April 17, the city reported its highest single-day death toll of 54 deaths. Days later, hospitals and funeral homes began to run out of space to store the bodies of those who were succumbing to COVID-19. On April 19, 2020, a reporter for the Philadelphia Inquirer photographed a pile of corpses wrapped in white sheets and stacked one on top of another in the cargo bed of a pickup truck at the Philadelphia Medical Examiner's Office. The corpses were tagged as coming from Einstein Medical Center located in the hard-hit Olney section of Philadelphia. Workers were seen stepping on top of the pile of deceased bodies to load them into refrigerator trucks.

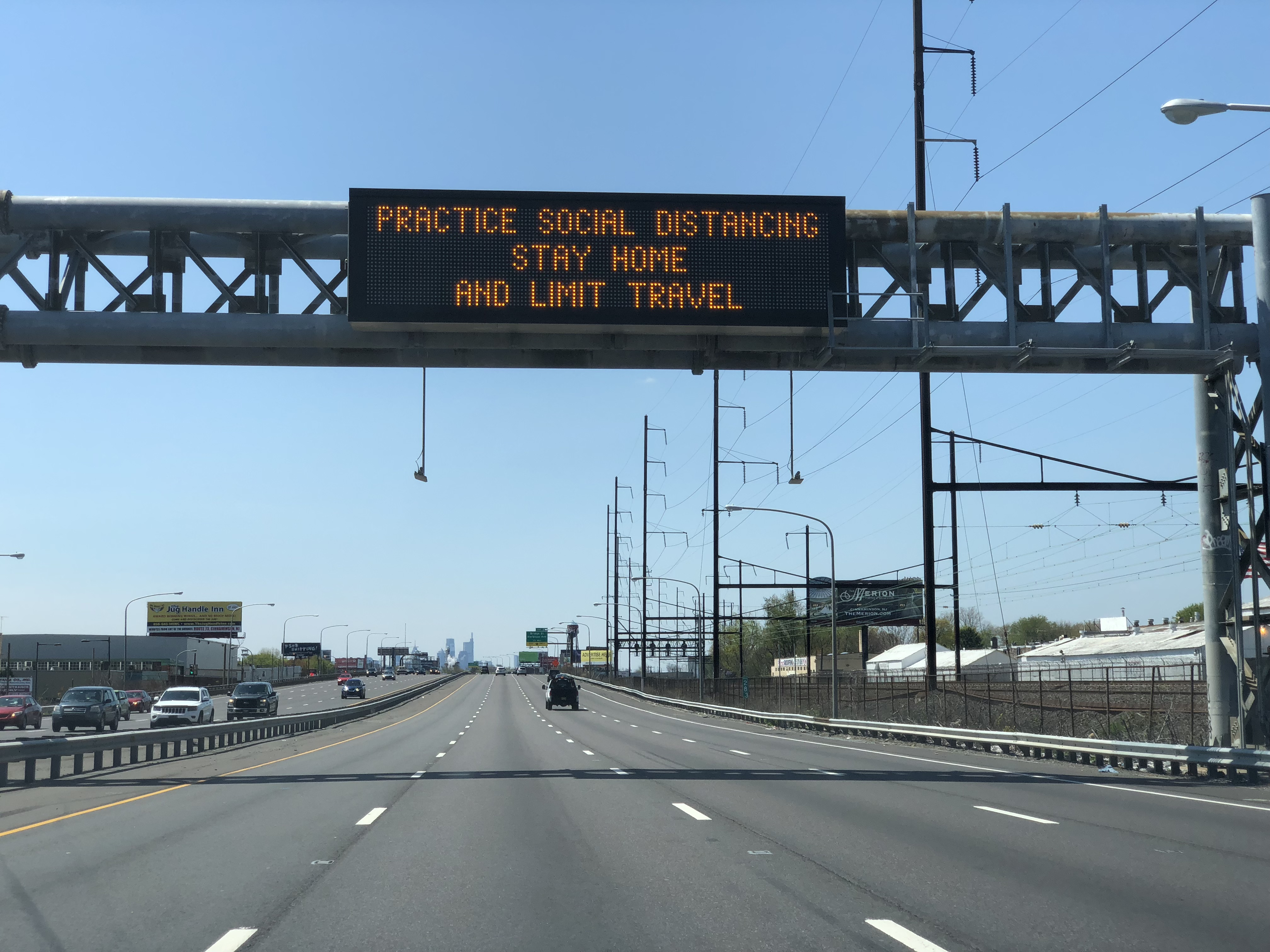
Variable-message sign along Interstate 95 in Philadelphia telling people to practice social distancing, stay home, and limit travel

In late May and early June 2020, large George Floyd protests and riots took place in Philadelphia, raising fears that COVID-19 would surge. However, by mid-June, weeks after the protests, not only did new COVID-19 cases decline, they reached the lowest rates seen since the start of the pandemic.

On June 5, 2020, Philadelphia moved from the red phase to the yellow phase of the state's reopening plan, which lifted the stay-at-home order and replaced it with a safer-at-home advisory and allowed for some businesses to reopen. While the city moved to the yellow phase on June 5, there were differences from the state's reopening plan. For example, outdoor dining was still not permitted and the city was recommending against gatherings of any size (whereas the state permitted gatherings of up to 25 people). On June 12, 2020, outdoor dining was allowed at restaurants in Philadelphia. On June 26, 2020, the state allowed for Philadelphia to move from the yellow phase to the green phase of the state's reopening plan, which allowed for more businesses to reopen. Among the businesses allowed to reopen on June 26 included residential swimming pools, private swim clubs, salons, barbershops, spas, and small gatherings of up to 25 people. The city kept some additional restrictions in place until July 3, 2020; on that date, museums, libraries, shopping malls, and casinos were allowed to reopen. Gyms and indoor dining at restaurants were planned to reopen on July 3; however, the reopening of these businesses was postponed due to a rise in cases. On July 20, 2020, gyms were allowed to reopen. On September 8, 2020, indoor dining at 25 percent capacity was allowed at restaurants in Philadelphia. On October 2, 2020, restaurants were allowed to increase to 50 percent capacity for indoor dining after completing self-certification documents.

After dropping to a low of just 4% on June 16, 2020, the city-wide positive rate slowly rose in late June and early July. By July 12, 2020, the city-wide positive rate had inched up to 7%, indicating that cases were again on the rise. On July 14, 2020, Mayor Jim Kenney announced a moratorium on all large public events through February 28, 2021. The moratorium would cancel all public festivals, carnivals, fairs, parades, concerts and flea markets that draw crowds over 50 people, affecting events such as the 6abc Dunkin' Thanksgiving Day Parade, the Philadelphia Marathon, and the Mummers Parade. Events such as the AIDS Walk Philly and the Gay Bingo fund raising event were cancelled, losing up to $100,000 in revenue. Philadelphia leaders formed the PHL COVID-19 Fund to assist non-profits. It has generated over $12 million.

Two block parties, one in Lawncrest and one in Allegheny West, were stopped by local police officers on the night of July 25, 2020, in an effort to stop viral transmission. On July 28, 2020, with COVID-19 continuing to mount, the School District of Philadelphia announced that students will only receive online instruction through November 17, 2020,

By late summer of 2020, Brewerytown, the neighborhood encompassing parts of Temple University, quickly emerged as the city's new hotspot for COVID-19 with a positivity rate nearly twice that of the overall city rate. On August 30, 2020, Temple University reverted to online instruction after 103 people tested positive. Contact tracing linked the outbreak to off-campus apartments and small social gatherings. On September 3, 2020, Temple University announced classes would be held online for the remainder of the fall semester. Following Temple University's closure, the infection rates in Brewerytown and surrounding North Philadelphia neighborhoods declined substantially.

On October 13, 2020, the city raised the gathering limits for both indoor and outdoor venues, which had previously been capped at 25 people for indoor venues and 250 people for outdoor venues. Indoor venues were allowed no more than 10 percent of total occupancy up to 250 people; while outdoor venues were allowed no more than 20 percent of total occupancy for venues with a maximum occupancy less than 2,000 people and no more than 15 percent of total occupancy up to 7,500 people for venues with a maximum occupancy greater than 2,000 people. The increase in gathering limits allowed for fans at Lincoln Financial Field for Philadelphia Eagles games, with 7,500 fans allowed to attend Eagles games starting with the October 18, 2020 game against the Baltimore Ravens.

On November 10, 2020, the School District of Philadelphia, which started the school year with all-virtual learning, delayed plans to return some students to hybrid learning due to an increase in cases. On November 16, 2020, the city announced new restrictions due to a surge in cases, which were in place from November 20, 2020, until January 1, 2021. The restrictions included no indoor dining at restaurants, capacity limits at retail stores and religious institutions, telework for office workers required unless it was not possible, a ban on indoor gatherings of any size, outdoor gatherings limited to 10 percent occupancy with a cap of 2,000 people, and no youth or school sports. Colleges, universities, and high schools were only allowed to offer online classes while elementary and middle schools were allowed in-person instruction following health guidelines. In addition, theaters, bowling alleys, casinos, gyms, museums, and libraries were ordered to be closed during this time. On December 22, 2020, the city announced the restrictions on indoor dining, indoor gatherings, theaters, colleges, and indoor organized sports would continue until January 15, 2021, due to an anticipated rise in cases following the Christmas and New Year's holidays. The city lifted restrictions on casinos, museums, outdoor sports, gyms, in-person learning at high schools, and outdoor catered events on January 4, 2021, as cases did not rise more than anticipated.

On March 3, 2021, the Federal Emergency Management Agency opened a mass COVID-19 vaccination site at the Pennsylvania Convention Center. The site was able to provide shots to about 47,000 people a week and was expected to operate for at least eight weeks.

On March 2, 2021, the city of Philadelphia raised capacity limits for indoor and outdoor events to match state guidelines, with indoor events limited to 15 percent maximum occupancy and outdoor events limited to 20 percent maximum occupancy. As a result, the Wells Fargo Center allowed about 3,100 fans back starting on March 7, 2021, for Philadelphia 76ers and Philadelphia Flyers games while Citizens Bank Park allowed 8,800 fans for Philadelphia Phillies games. On March 8, 2021, the School District of Philadelphia moved to hybrid learning for students from Pre-K through 2nd grade at 53 schools, with safety measures put into place. On March 16, 2021, the city announced that the Office of Special Events and Philadelphia Parks and Recreation would start accepting event permit applications, while the Streets Department would start accepting applications for festivals and block parties on April 15, 2021.

After the state announced it was loosening several restrictions on April 4, 2021, including allowing bar service, allowing alcohol to be served without the purchase of food, and increasing capacity limits at various businesses including restaurants, gyms, and entertainment, the city of Philadelphia announced on March 23, 2021, that it would not follow the rest of the state in adopting the loosened restrictions due to a rise in cases and hospitalizations in the city. The city did however increase the maximum capacity of outdoor catered events to 250 people and allowed for food to be served at business meetings. During the month of April, the city reviewed local trends in COVID-19 cases to determine if the city could loosen restrictions. On April 27, 2021, the city announced that effective May 7, 2021, restaurants would be allowed to increase to 50 percent capacity or 75 percent capacity with enhanced ventilation standards while indoor catered events would be allowed at 25 percent capacity with a maximum of 75 people. In addition, other gatherings and events would be allowed at 25 percent capacity indoors and 50 percent capacity outdoors.

On May 21, 2021, the city lifted the outdoor mask mandate for fully vaccinated people, reduced social distancing at restaurants from 6 feet (1.8 m) to 3 feet (0.91 m), and lifted capacity limits at retail stores, museums, and libraries. On May 28, 2021, the city announced it would lift several restrictions on June 2, 2021, having previously announced these restrictions would be lifted on June 11, 2021. On that date, density limits, capacity limits, and social distancing rules were lifted; however, the indoor mask mandate and 11 p.m. last call for dining remained in place. On June 11, the indoor mask mandate and the 11 p.m. last call for dining were lifted.

On July 22, 2021, the city again recommended people wear masks in indoor public spaces, regardless of vaccination status, due to a rise in cases among unvaccinated people including children. On August 11, 2021, the city announced that effective August 12, masks would be required to be worn inside businesses unless the business requires proof of vaccination. In addition, masks would be required for unseated outdoor gatherings of greater than 1,000 people. Beginning on September 1, 2021, new employees hired by the city must be fully vaccinated against COVID-19 while current employees will need to either be fully vaccinated or double mask while indoors. On August 13, 2021, the city announced that healthcare workers and students and staff at colleges in Philadelphia would be required to be vaccinated by October 15. In addition, the city announced essential businesses including grocery stores, pharmacies, doctors offices, and urgent care centers would only be allowed to have a mask mandate and not the option requiring proof of vaccination. On August 24, 2021, the school board of the School District of Philadelphia voted unanimously to mandate teachers and staff be vaccinated against COVID-19.

On December 13, 2021, the city announced that proof of a COVID-19 vaccine would be required for indoor dining at restaurants and food establishments beginning on January 3, 2022. On December 15, 2021, city health officials warned against holiday gatherings involving multiple households due to an increase in cases and hospitalizations. On December 22, 2021, Temple University announced that classes for the first three weeks of the spring 2022 semester would be held virtually due to the rise in COVID-19 cases caused by the SARS-CoV-2 Omicron variant. On January 3, 2022, the School District of Philadelphia announced that 81 schools would switch to virtual learning for the remainder of the week starting on January 4, 2022, due to staffing issues related to the rise in COVID-19 cases.

On February 16, 2022, the city dropped the vaccine mandate for indoor dining due to a decline in COVID-19 cases while keeping the indoor mask mandate in place. In addition, the city unveiled a tiered response to the COVID-19 pandemic, with four tiers based on number of cases, test positivity, hospitalizations, and the rate of cases. In the lowest tier, "All Clear", city mask mandates will be lifted (with the exception of schools, healthcare facilities, congregate settings, and public transportation) and there will be no vaccine mandate for indoor dining. In the next tier, "Mask Precautions", a mask mandate will be in place while there will still be no vaccine mandate for indoor dining. In the next tier, "Caution", a mask mandate will be in place while either proof of vaccination or a negative test will be required for indoor dining. In the highest tier, "Extreme Caution", a mask mandate will be in place while proof of vaccination will be required for indoor dining. As of February 16, 2022, the city is in the "Mask Precautions" tier. On March 2, 2022, the city moved to the "All Clear" tier, ending the indoor mask mandate. The federal mask mandates for healthcare facilities and public transportation, in addition to the school mask mandate, will remain in place, while masks will be required in city buildings until March 7, 2022, at which time the mandate will be lifted for visitors and fully vaccinated staff. On March 9, 2022, the city made masks optional in public and archdiocesan schools; masks would still be required in PreK Head Start programs. A mask mandate was reinstated for one week after spring break to avoid a surge in cases following the break.

On April 5, 2022, the city recommended people wear masks indoor again due to an uptick in cases caused by the BA.2 subvariant of the SARS-CoV-2 Omicron variant. The city however remained in the "All Clear" tier. On April 11, 2022, the city moved back into the "Mask Precautions" tier, with an indoor mask mandate to be implemented starting on April 18, 2022. After the federal mask mandate for public transportation was struck down on April 18, 2022; SEPTA announced that masks will no longer be required onboard vehicles and inside stations and concourses. On April 22, 2022, the city lifted the indoor mask mandate due to declining cases and hospitalizations, with masks recommended in indoor public spaces; masks will still be required in healthcare and congregate settings.

On May 23, 2022, the School District of Philadelphia began requiring masks again for students and staff in buildings and on buses and vans due to an increase in cases. On August 12, 2022, the School District of Philadelphia announced that masks for the upcoming school year will be based on COVID-19 transmission levels. Masks were required for the first 10 days of the school year due to summer gatherings. Starting on September 12, 2022, masks will become optional but recommended. The School District of Philadelphia will require masks for 10 days following winter break in order to reduce the transmission of COVID-19 and other respiratory illnesses; the mandatory masking period will run from January 3, 2023, to January 13, 2023.

== Demographics ==
According to the Philadelphia Department of Public Health, African Americans, Hispanic Americans and White Americans presented with roughly equal rates of infection when adjusted for population size. Data also show that African Americans and White Americans were both more likely than Hispanic Americans and Asian Americans to die from the virus, when adjusted for population size. Although Asian-Americans were initially discriminated against for spreading the virus, data show that Asian-Americans present with the lowest infection rate of all racial groups in the city.

According to the Philadelphia Department of Public Health, the risk of dying from COVID-19 increases substantially with age. Approximately half of all deaths have occurred in persons age 75 or older. Department of Public Health data show that 361 children have been hospitalized with the virus, one of whom has died from the virus. Nearly 2,000 hospitalizations and 40 deaths due to the virus have occurred in young adults aged 20–34.

When adjusted for population size, males are more likely than females to die from COVID-19.

== Data ==
The neighborhood that experienced the most cases overall was Juniata, which reported 9,356 cases, or 11% of the neighborhood's population.

The neighborhood with the worst testing rate is Oxford Circle in Northeast Philadelphia. The neighborhood with the highest overall positivity rate for the virus in the city of Philadelphia is also Oxford Circle, which reports an overall, all time positivity rate of 9.3%.

The neighborhoods of Bustleton and Somerton in Northeast Philadelphia were particularly hard-hit by the COVID-19 pandemic. During the peak of the pandemic, multiple nursing homes in these neighborhoods reported over 80% positivity rates and death rates that exceeded 20%. St. John Neumann Center for Rehabilitation & Healthcare, in Somerton, reported 40 deaths among residents and staff, the highest number of COVID-19 deaths at any single location (outside of a hospital) in the City of Philadelphia. In October 2020, CMS stopped reporting the number of COVID-19 deaths at St. John Neumann Center for Rehabilitation & Healthcare. According to datasets published by the City of Philadelphia in 2021, Bustleton was the neighborhood with the most COVID-19 deaths in the city. Approximately 0.6% of the total population of Bustleton perished from the virus.

As of November 2021, the City of Philadelphia reported a total of 2,229 infections in its prisons during the pandemic. The city reports that most of these cases were asymptomatic. The city has not released data indicating how many prisoners have been hospitalized or have died due to COVID-19. In December 2020, following a large spike of at least 150 new, concurrently active cases of the deadly virus in Philadelphia prisons, the Department of Prisons instituted a "shelter in place" for the city's prisons, requiring inmates to attend court hearings remotely via telecommunication.

== See also ==
- Philadelphia Liberty Loans Parade
