= 2026 Pennsylvania measles outbreak =

Measles outbreak in Pennsylvania

- Disease: Measles
- Index case: Lebanon County
- Confirmed cases: 1433
- Hospitalized cases: 269
- Deaths: 6

The 2026 Pennsylvania measles outbreak is an ongoing outbreak of measles in the U.S. state of Pennsylvania. Part of the 2010s–2020s measles resurgence in the United States, the principal outbreak began in the Lebanon County area in late April 2026, subsequently spreading across much of the state. As of November 2026 there have been over 1,400 confirmed cases, with 269 hospitalisations, and six deaths across 44 counties. Over 99% of the cases, including 100% of hospitalisations and deaths, have occurred in people unvaccinated for the disease. On October 13, the CDC said it would deploy additional support to combat the growing outbreak.

== Background ==
Measles is one of the most contagious infectious diseases. During the early stage of an outbreak in an unvaccinated population, each infected person spreads the disease to an average of 12 to 18 other people. The recommended measles vaccination protocol is to receive two doses, at least one month apart. One dose of the vaccination is 93 percent effective at preventing measles, while two doses is 97 percent effective.

Measles was declared eliminated from the United States in 2000, by the World Health Organization (WHO) due to the success of vaccination efforts. However, it continues to be reintroduced—especially when unvaccinated people travel out of the United States to places where measles is present. Anti-vaccination sentiment continues to exacerbate the reemergence of measles outbreaks.

In the 2010s and 2020s, public confidence in childhood vaccines against potentially fatal diseases such as measles declined in the United States. A Reuters/Ipsos poll conducted in September 2026 found that 76% of Americans considered the measles, mumps, and rubella (MMR) vaccine safe for children — a decrease from 84% recorded in a comparable Reuters/Ipsos survey in May 2020. The erosion of confidence was most evident among Republicans, a segment of the population in which some political figures have publicly questioned the necessity of routine childhood immunization. This decline in vaccine confidence has coincided with the largest measles outbreaks in the United States in decades. National vaccination rates among kindergarten children fell to 92.5% in 2025, below the 95% threshold that epidemiologists consider necessary to maintain herd immunity and protect individuals who cannot be vaccinated for medical reasons.

== Timeline of cases and deaths ==
As of September 15, 2026, the Pennsylvania Department of Health (DOH) had confirmed 693 cases in 38 counties, with 133 hospitalizations and five measles-associated deaths. The first four deaths included two infants who were too young to be vaccinated, a 40-year-old female, and an 18-year-old, all of whom were unvaccinated for the disease. It was the state's largest measles outbreak in more than three decades.

Pennsylvania had previously recorded several unrelated measles infections during the first months of 2026, with twelve cases in Lancaster, Montgomery and Chester counties preceding the outbreak that began in Lebanon County in late April. The Pennsylvania Department of Health issued an advisory on May 1, 2026, after identifying three measles cases in Lebanon County. Three residents were hospitalized, and contact tracing identified additional infections. By May 6, eleven Lebanon County residents had been diagnosed, of which ten were unvaccinated and the vaccination status of the eleventh could not be verified. By June 26, the outbreak had expanded into Lancaster County and neighboring areas, with the state recording 84 cases, including 72 associated with the Lancaster–Lebanon region. Cases accelerated during August and September, with 393 confirmed cases by August 25, 540 by September 3, 624 by September 9, and 693 by September 14, reaching 38 counties. Of the 676 cases that had been reported by September 11, only four occurred in people who were appropriately vaccinated for their age under state guidelines. By September 16, 2026, 141 of Pennsylvania's 731 confirmed measles cases had required hospitalization, with complications reported in hospitalized patients including gastrointestinal complications and hepatitis. By September 28, the number of cases had passed 900, reaching 903. A fifth death was confirmed on September 30. By October 5, the number of cases reached 1,004, including 198 hospitalised. By October 10, the number has risen to 1,078 cases total including 207 hospitalizations in 41 counties. A sixth death was confirmed on October 13, including 1,137 confirmed cases and 219 hospitalizations across 42 counties. On October 13–15, the CDC said it would deploy additional support to combat the growing outbreak, which included sending over one of their own scientists. Additionally, they released $4 million in aid specifically for the outbreak. The toll had risen to 1,222 cases and 225 hospitalizations by October 14. By October 16, it had grown to 1,260 cases and 238 hospitalizations across 43 counties. By October 19, it was 1,286 cases and 247 hospitalizations. The toll by October 23 was set at 1,338 cases and 255 hospitalizations across 44 counties.By October 28, there were 1,398 measles cases across 44 counties, along with 265 hospitalizaions and 5 confirmed deaths.

As of November 3, there has been 1433 cases and 269 hospitalisations in 44 counties.

== Political responses ==
The outbreak became politically controversial after Pennsylvania reported its first two measles-associated deaths in August. Robert F. Kennedy Jr., the United States Secretary of Health and Human Services, long-noted as an anti-vaccine conspiracy theorist, publicly questioned whether measles had contributed to the deaths and suggested that they might have been "fabricated" for governor Josh Shapiro to profit from politically. After CDC staff accepted Pennsylvania's classification, Kennedy asked newly appointed CDC director Erica Schwartz to remove the deaths from the agency's national measles tally. Subsequent investigations by the Lancaster County coroner determined that measles caused the death of one infant and was a significant contributing condition in the death of a second.

The announcement of the first two deaths on August 25 led to a public dispute between Secretary Kennedy and governor Shapiro. Kennedy had publicly questioned established vaccination policies for many years before joining the administration of President Donald Trump. Kennedy called Shapiro before the August announcement and offered additional federal assistance with the outbreak. Shapiro said that Pennsylvania already had federal personnel working with state officials and did not require further assistance. At a press conference later that day, Shapiro criticized Kennedy's past statements about vaccines, and said they had contributed to confusion about vaccination. Kennedy responded publicly the following day, accusing the governor of politicizing the outbreak, and asserting that Pennsylvania had failed to provide adequate information about the deaths to federal officials. He also suggested that the reported deaths "may even have been altogether fabricated".

Senator Bill Cassidy, the Republican chair of the Senate Health Committee, attributed the Pennsylvania measles deaths to vaccine misinformation and policies of the Trump administration, calling the outbreak a potential "terrible legacy" for the administration.
