= 2019–2020 measles outbreaks =

Global measles outbreaks in 2019

The 2019 measles outbreaks refer to a substantial global increase in the number of measles cases reported, relative to 2018. As of April 2019, the number of measles cases reported worldwide represented a 300% increase from the number of cases seen in the previous year, constituting over 110,000 measles cases reported in the first three months of 2019. In the first half of 2019, the World Health Organization received reports of 364,808 measles cases from 182 countries, up 182% from the same time period of 2018 when 129,239 confirmed cases were reported by 181 countries.

== Countries affected ==
In the United States, the number of measles cases was set to reach a 25-year high by the middle of the year, beginning with a large concentration of cases in the Pacific Northwest followed by another in New York, as well in the U.S. state of California with two quarantines ordered at two colleges in Los Angeles on April 28, 2019. Other countries reporting large increases included Brazil, Nigeria, Israel, Ukraine, Madagascar, India, and the Philippines. However, the largest and most fatal outbreak of measles in 2019 occurred in the Democratic Republic of the Congo. Other notable outbreak locations include the 2019 Kuala Koh measles outbreak, 2019 Philippines measles outbreak in Asia; the 2019 Pacific Northwest measles outbreak and 2019 New York measles outbreak in the United States; 2019–2020 New Zealand measles outbreak, and 2019 Samoa measles outbreak in Oceania.

== Contributing factors ==
In some countries, this outbreak has been fueled by lack of access to the measles vaccine, while in others it has been exacerbated by opposition to vaccination. As one such example, the outbreak in the Philippines was attributed by Health Secretary Francisco Duque III to lowered trust in the government's immunization drive due to a controversy regarding administration of a dengue vaccine. The outbreak prompted President Donald Trump to shift away from his previous skepticism regarding vaccination, and to insist that parents must vaccinate their children. The Trump Administration also took a forceful position of requiring vaccination, with Trump's Surgeon General Jerome Adams calling for limitations on exemptions to vaccination.

== See also ==
- Vaccine hesitancy
