= Measles =

Viral disease affecting humans

- Other names: Morbilli, rubeola, red measles, English measles
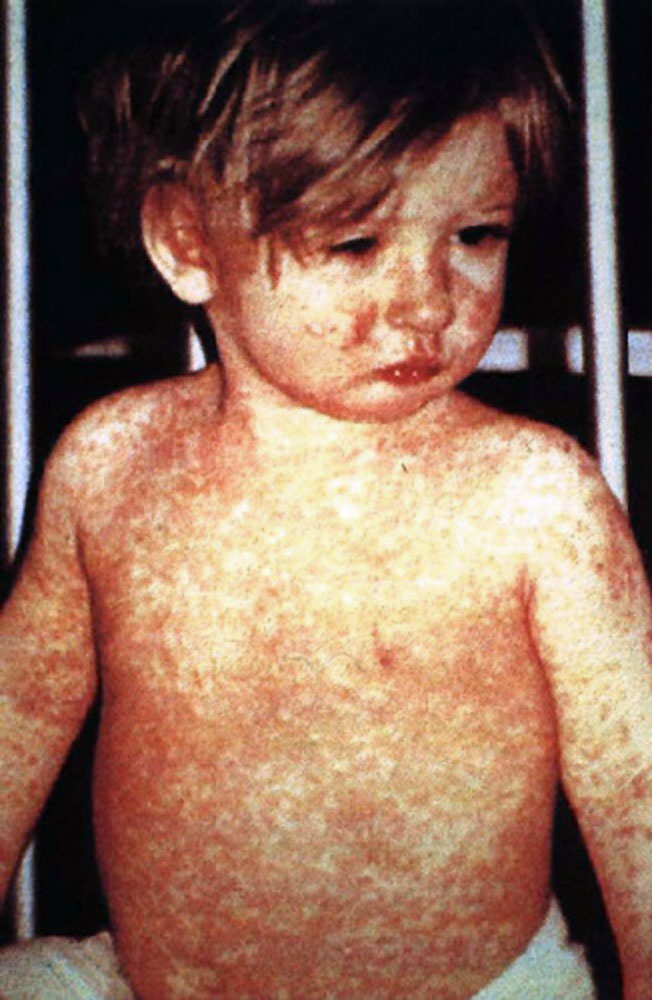
- A child showing a day-four measles rash
- Specialty: Infectious disease
- Symptoms: Fever, cough, runny nose, red eyes, rash
- Complications: Pneumonia, seizures, encephalitis, subacute sclerosing panencephalitis, immunosuppression, hearing loss, blindness
- Usual onset: 10–12 days after exposure
- Duration: 7–10 days (not including complications)
- Causes: Measles virus (Morbillivirus hominis)
- Prevention: Measles vaccine
- Treatment: Supportive care
- Frequency: 10 million per year
- Deaths: 140,000+ (2018)

Measles is a highly contagious, vaccine-preventable infectious disease caused by the measles virus. Other names include morbilli, rubeola, 9-day measles, red measles, and English measles. Symptoms usually develop 10–12 days after exposure to an infected person and last 7–10 days. Initial symptoms typically include fever, often greater than 40 °C (104 °F), cough, runny nose, and inflamed eyes. Small white spots known as Koplik spots may form inside the mouth two or three days after the start of symptoms, followed by a rash which usually starts on the face and then spreads to the rest of the body. Common complications include diarrhea (in 8% of cases), middle ear infection (7%), and pneumonia (6%). These occur in part due to measles-induced immunosuppression. Less commonly, seizures, blindness, or inflammation of the brain may occur.

Measles is caused by the measles virus, an RNA virus which is closely related to rinderpest (affecting cattle) and canine distemper. Measles is an airborne disease which spreads easily from one person to the next through the coughs and sneezes of infected people. People are infectious to others from four days before to four days after the start of the rash. Immunity is lifelong once it has been acquired, either through vaccination or after recovering from the disease. Diagnosis of measles by symptoms is difficult, as many of the symptoms can be caused by a number of diseases; laboratory tests are necessary for a conclusive diagnosis.

There is no specific antiviral treatment. Instead medications are aimed at preventing or treating secondary infections, maintaining good hydration, and pain relief. The measles vaccine is safe and effective at preventing the disease. It is generally delivered in combination with other vaccines, with the first dose administered to infants between 9 and 18 months of age, and a second dose a few months later. Due to the ease of transmission more than 95% of the community must be vaccinated in order to achieve herd immunity.

Measles is currently estimated to infect about 10 million people and cause 95,000 deaths a year, primarily in countries with low per capita income and poor health systems. It is a significant cause of death among children. Vaccination programs resulted in an 80% decrease in deaths from measles between 2000 and 2017, with about 85% of children worldwide having received their first dose as of 2017. There has been little progress since then, in part due to the COVID-19 pandemic, and in part due to the difficulty of delivering vaccination programs in poor and conflicted areas of the world. Genomic analysis indicates that measles as a human disease evolved from rinderpest, between 900 and 2,400 years ago; historical accounts of a disease closely resembling measles exist from the 7th century. Prior to the introduction of vaccination programs, measles was endemic worldwide, causing an estimated 2 million deaths every year. The word is probably from Middle Dutch or Middle High German masel(e), meaning "blemish, blood blister".

Video summary (script)

== Signs and symptoms ==
The initial symptoms of measles are non-specific, resembling a common cold – raised temperature, runny nose, sneezing, cough, and sore eyes (conjunctivitis). These symptoms begin 7–23 days (most commonly, 10–14 days) after exposure to an infected person. The fever may reach or exceed 104 °F (40 °C). After a couple more days, little white spots may appear inside the mouth (Koplik spots); they are short lived and may not be noticed. At this stage of infection a characteristic skin rash appears, initially on the face and behind the ears, spreading to the rest of the body.

Uncomplicated cases of measles typically improve within days of rash onset and resolve within 7–10 days. The virus is contagious from four days before to four days after the rash appears.

Because development of the rash and conjunctivitis requires a functional immune system, immunocompromised people may not be diagnosed as readily.

Appearance of measles in children with different skin tones

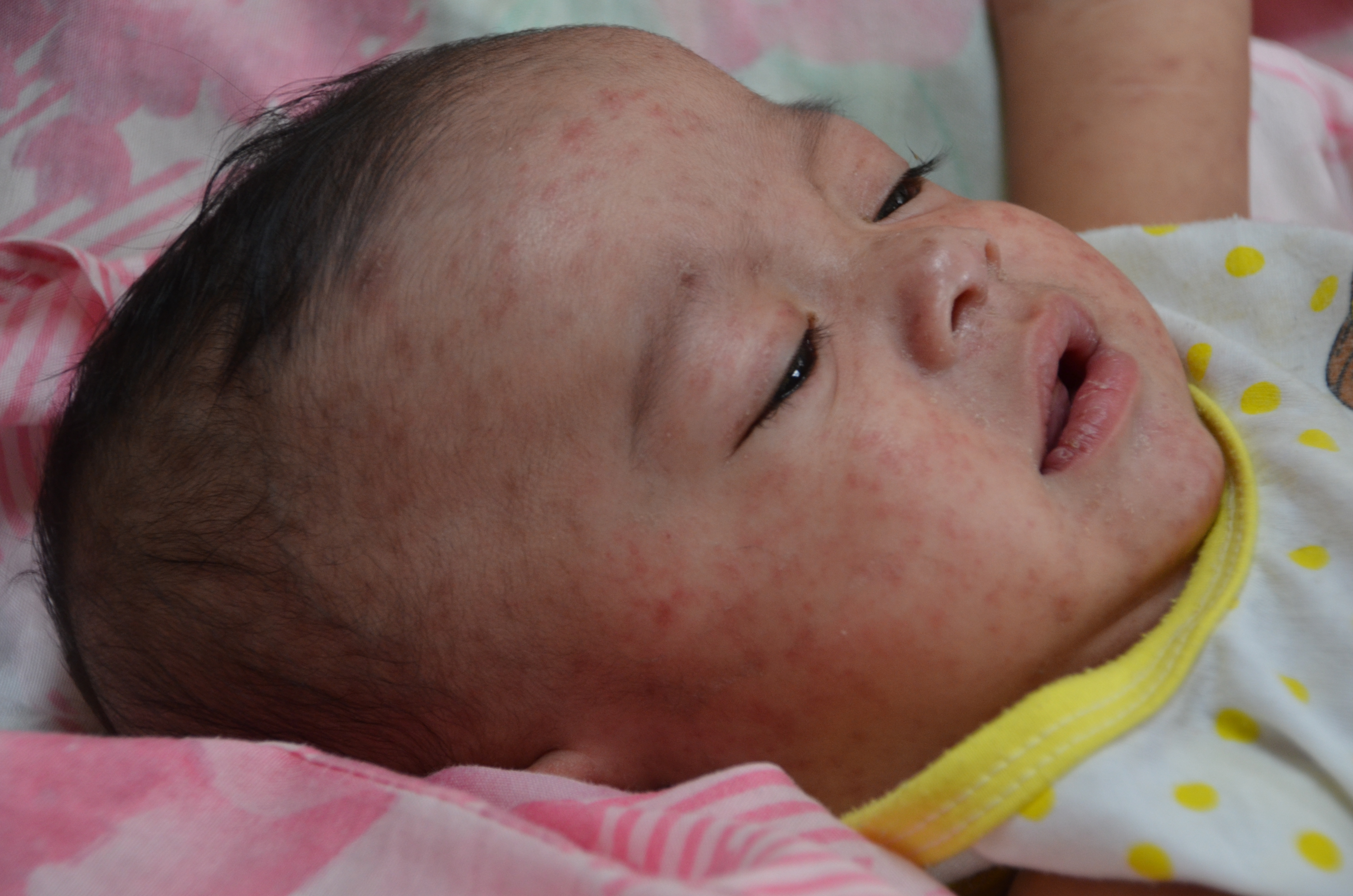
A baby with measles

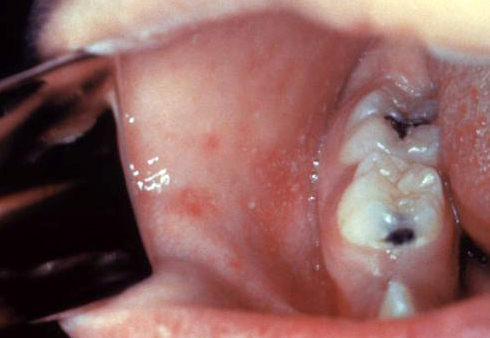
Koplik spots

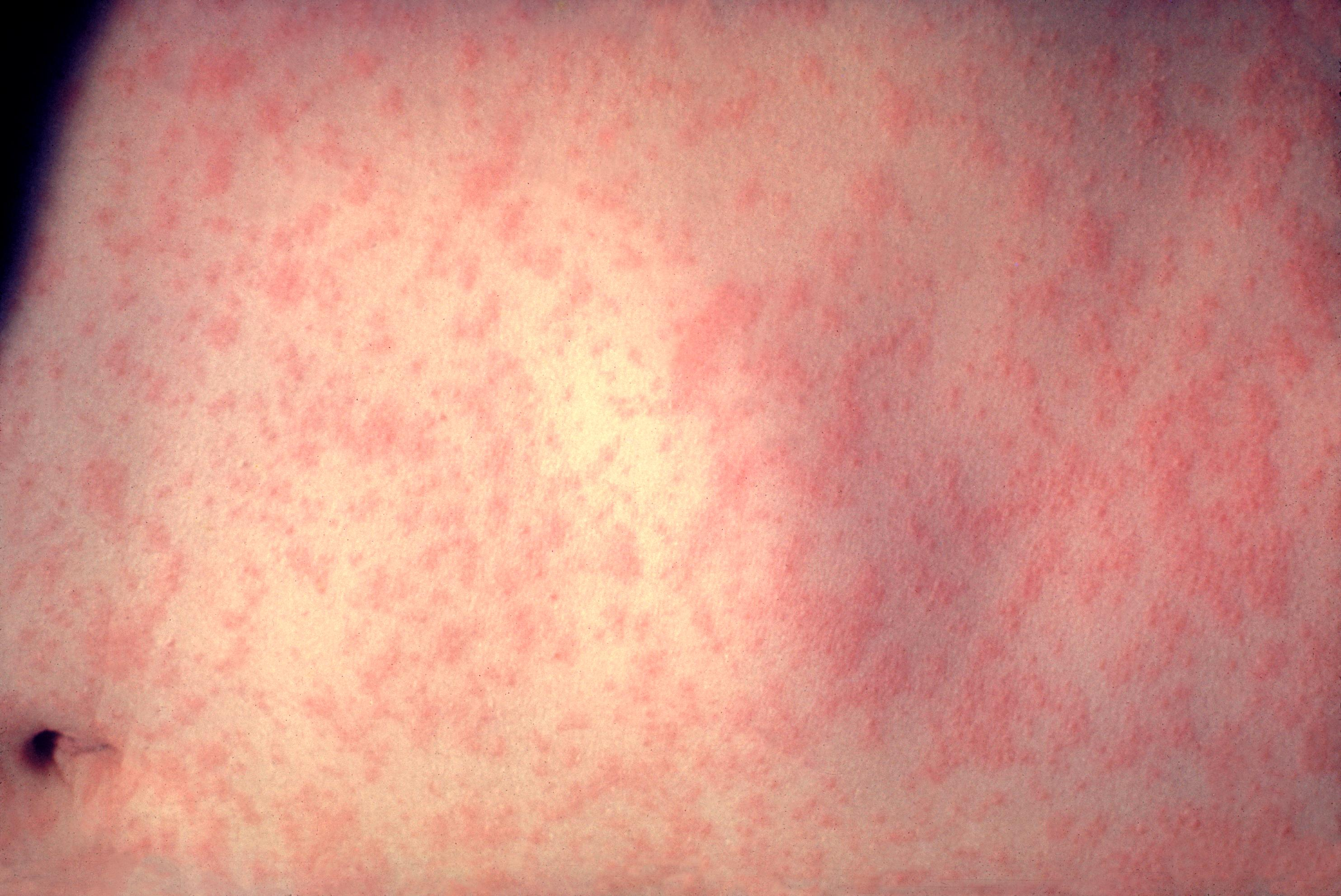
Abdominal rash

=== Complications ===
Immediate complications of measles are common, affecting approximately 30% of cases. Common complications are middle ear infections, conjunctivitis, severe diarrhea (leading to dehydration), and breathing problems such as croup and pneumonia.

Complications can be severe, such as encephalitis, deafness, blindness and rare but usually fatal subacute sclerosing panencephalitis (SSPE). In the US, the CDC estimates 1 out of every 5 unvaccinated people who get measles will need to be hospitalized; and that between 1 and 3 out of every 1,000 children with the disease will die of its complications. Mortality is worse in places with poor nutrition and poor healthcare – in parts of Africa, the case fatality rate is estimated up to 6% for settled populations, rising as high as 30% in refugee settlements. Pneumonia and encephalitis are the leading causes of death following measles.

==== Pregnancy ====
Measles during pregnancy can have serious consequences for both mother and child. Pregnant women infected with measles are significantly more likely to need hospitalisation and are at greater risk of pneumonia and death. There are also increased risks of miscarriage, premature delivery, and of babies having low birth weight.

==== Underlying mechanisms ====
Some complications are caused directly by the virus, while others are caused by viral suppression of the immune system.

The virus damages the membranes lining the respiratory tract (nose, throat and lungs), sometimes causing viral pneumonia but also making it easy for bacteria to cause secondary pneumonia and bronchitis. It can also damage the lining of the Eustachian tube, allowing bacteria to penetrate to and infect the middle ear (otitis media). Viral infection of the intestine leads to diarrhea, sometimes severe causing dehydration. In rare cases, the virus directly invades the central nervous system, triggering severe inflammatory responses or autoimmune demyelination, which can lead to post-infectious encephalitis.

A mechanism called "immune amnesia" (see below) underlies longer term consequences of measles. The virus targets the memory cells of the immune system; these are components of the adaptive immune system, providing the body with resistance to pathogens which have previously been encountered. Without these cells, the patient's body has little or no immunity to diseases which it had previously been immune to; the effect lasts for up to three years after the measles infection.

==== Risk factors ====
Those under 5 and over 20 are at higher risk for complications. Conditions which weaken or modify the immune response also increase risk for complications; these include pregnancy, malnutrition, hematologic cancer, HIV/AIDS, and use of immunosuppressive medication.

==== Immune amnesia ====
The measles virus can deplete previously acquired immune memory by killing cells that make antibodies, and thus weakens the immune system, opening the body up to potentially severe infections from other diseases. Suppression of the immune system by measles lasts up to three years and has been epidemiologically implicated in an increase in childhood mortality from other infectious diseases during this period. The measles vaccine contains an attenuated strain of the virus which does not deplete immune memory.

This suppression phenomenon, known as "immune amnesia", increases the risk of subsequent infections. Shortly after recovering from measles, there is a significant decrease in antibodies against other bacteria and viruses that patients may have acquired during their lifetimes prior to infection with the measles virus. Primate studies suggest that immune amnesia arises during infection when the virus destroys existing memory lymphocytes; after recovery, the body generates new memory lymphocytes which are specific to measles virus alone. This creates lasting immunity to measles re-infection, but destroys existing immunities to other diseases. Comparison of childhood mortality statistics from before and after the introduction of measles vaccination suggests that immune amnesia continues for 2–3 years following infection with the measles virus.

== Cause ==
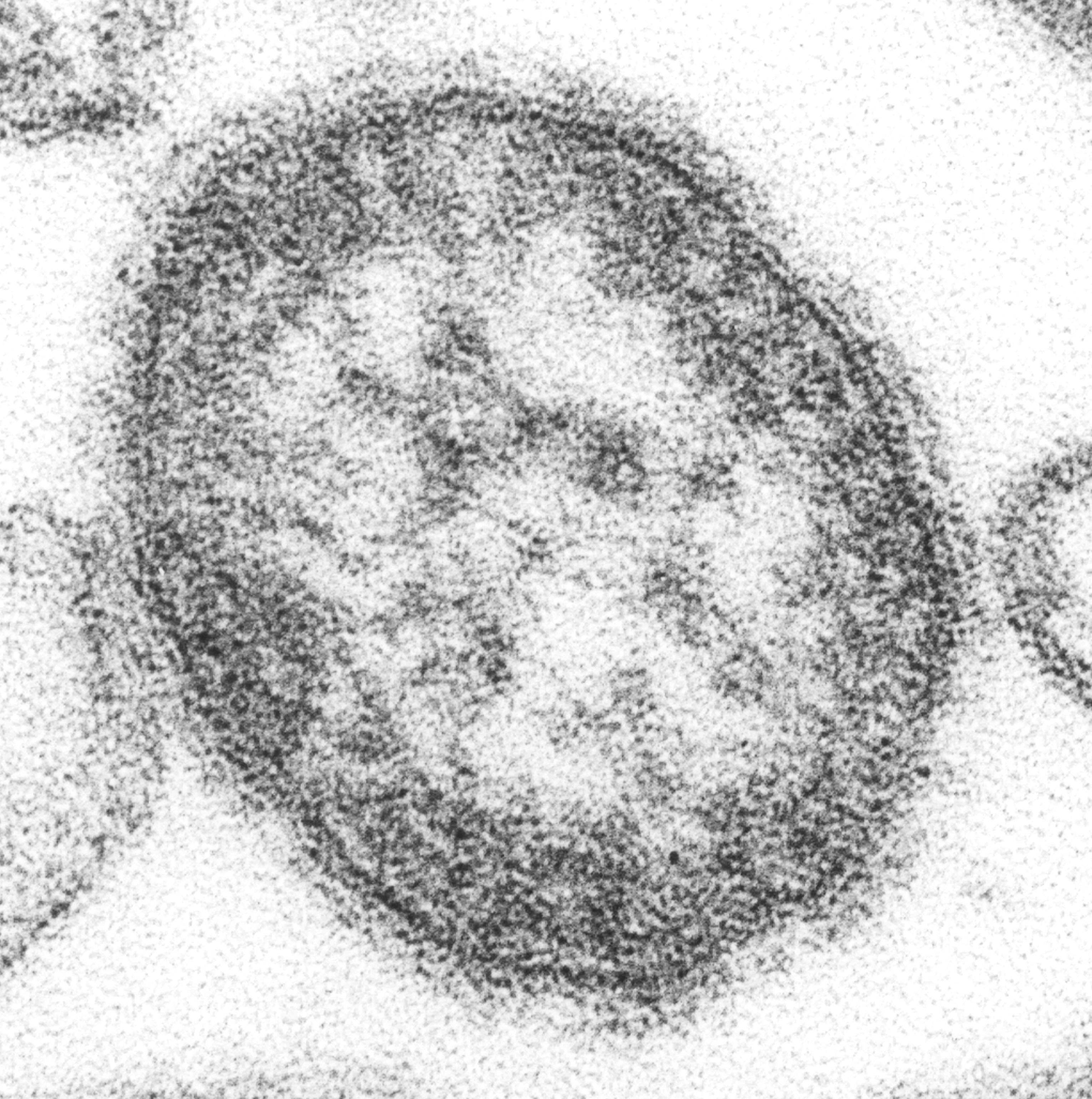
An electron micrograph of the measles virus

Measles is caused by the measles virus, a single-stranded, non-segmented, negative-sense, enveloped RNA virus of the genus Morbillivirus within the family Paramyxoviridae. It is related most closely to rinderpest, a cattle virus eradicated in 2001, and canine distemper, a mammalian disease that causes neurologic deterioration. There are 24 strains of measles virus divided into eight clades designated A-H.

Humans are the only natural hosts of the virus, and no other animal host is known to exist, although mountain gorillas are believed to be susceptible to the disease.

Risk factors for measles virus infection include immunodeficiency caused by HIV/AIDS, immunosuppression following receipt of an organ or a stem cell transplant, alkylating agents, or corticosteroid therapy, regardless of immunization status; and travel to areas where measles commonly occurs or contact with travelers from such an area. Very young children may be protected by antibodies acquired from their mother during pregnancy, but this immunity fades out a few weeks or months after birth.

== Pathophysiology ==
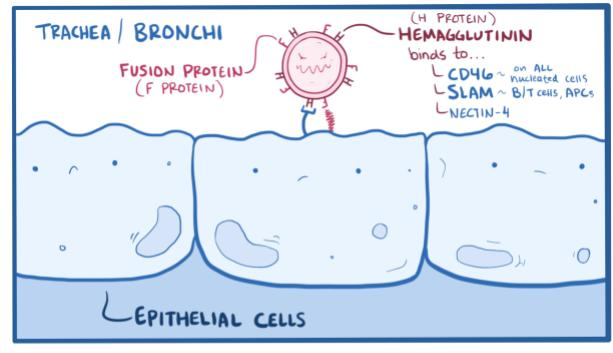
Drawing of the measles virus attaching to the lining of the trachea

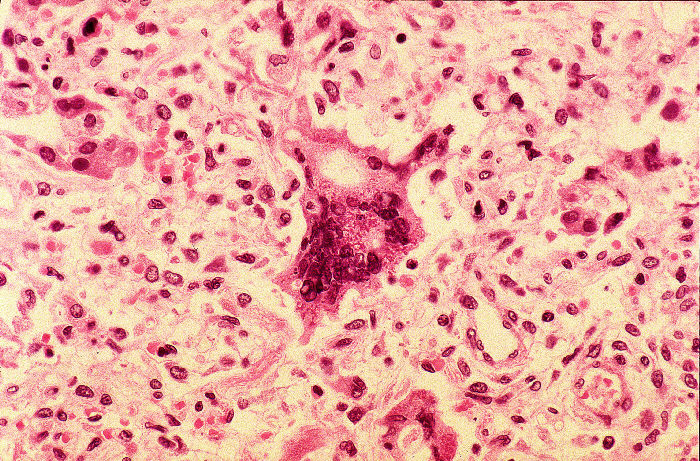
Photomicrograph of a lung tissue specimen, showing the histopathologic changes encountered in a case of measles pneumonia. Included in this view are numerous leukocytes and a multinucleated giant cell. Normal alveolar cytoarchitecture has been obliterated.

Infection begins when the virus enters the new host's airways in droplets exhaled by another infected person, and targets cells of the immune system (macrophages and dendritic cells) in the lining of the airways. The viral hemagglutinin protein (H) binds to SLAM receptors (signaling lymphocyte activation molecule, also called CD150) on the surface of these cells, and the viral fusion protein (F) then fuses the membranes of the virion and the cell, enabling the genetic material of the virus to invade the cell.

The cycle of infection within a cell covers approximately 24 hours, during this time, the infected cell generates progressively greater quantities of viral proteins and RNA. The H and F proteins are expressed on the cell's membrane and cause it to fuse with and infect neighbouring cells. New virus particles (virions) bud off until eventually the cell breaks apart and releases a payload of virions into the surrounding tissues.

Over the two to three days following initial infection, infected cells spread through the body's lymphatic system (lymph nodes and spleen) where they pass the virus on to other groups of immune cells, including B cells, T cells, thymocytes, and hematopoietic stem cells. Together with the action of the virus' V and C proteins, this compromises the body's ability to mount an immune response to the infection. Measles has been described as a "Trojan horse" infection as the immune system normally protects the body from infection. In measles, it has been infiltrated and instead becomes a conduit through which the infection grows and spreads.

Infective virions spread through the blood circulation, continuing to target cells of the immune system via SLAM receptors, as well as epithelial cells in the skin and respiratory tract by targeting nectin-4, a protein which normally binds epithelial cells together. The early symptoms of measles appear approximately 10 to 14 days after infection, driven by damage to epithelial cells and the beginning of an immune response. A persistent cough, conjunctivitis, and Koplik spots are caused by damage to epithelial cells, with the cough releasing highly infective droplets. Fever develops as the body begins to generate an immune response.

The typical measles rash which develops a few days later is caused by T-lymphocytes which recognise infected cells in the skin and destroy them.

== Transmission ==
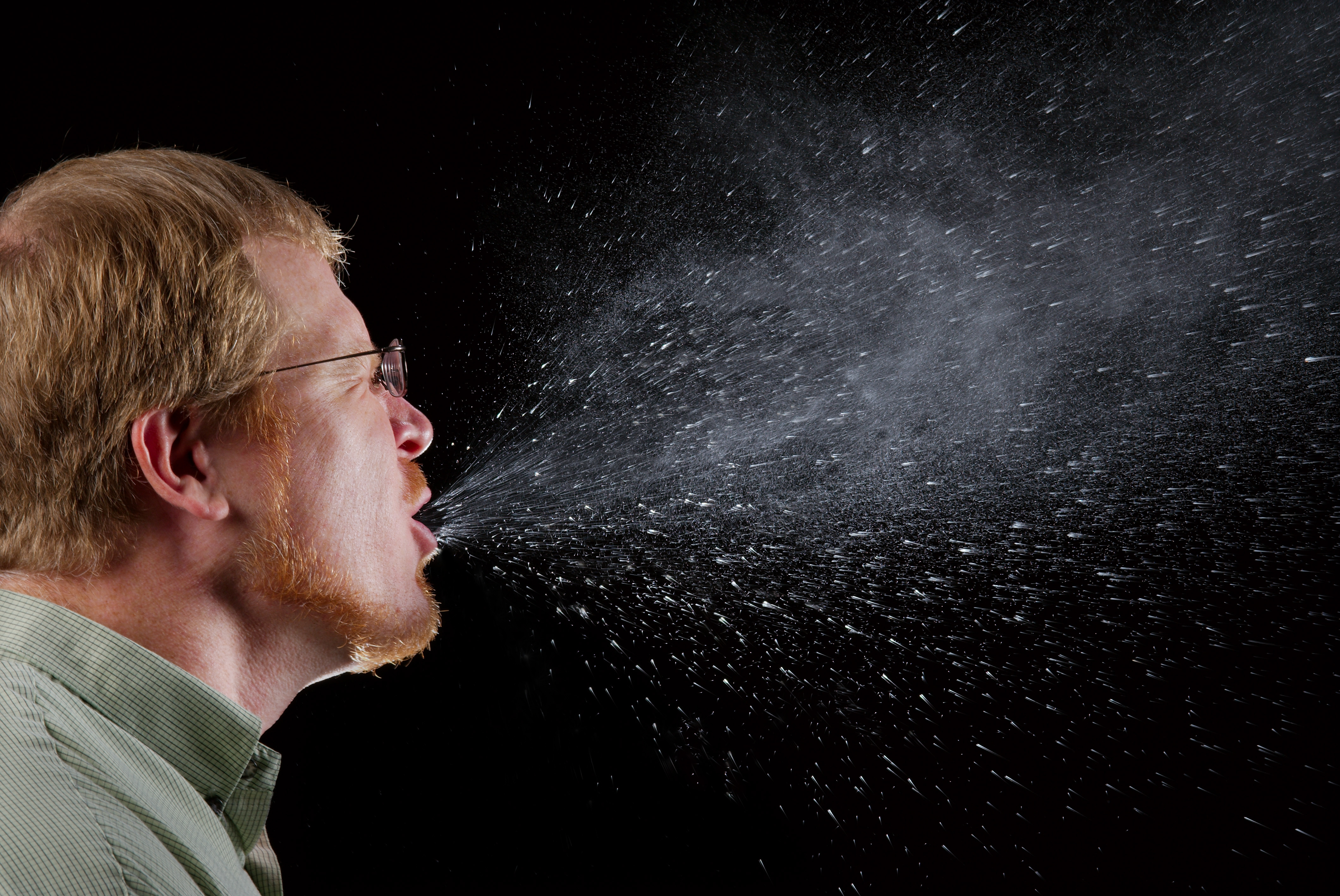
Airborne droplets expelled by a person sneezing.

Measles is spread by airborne transmission – when an infected person coughs, sneezes or talks, they exhale droplets which carry the virus. These can persist in the air for up to two hours, and be inhaled by a person who has no immunity, thus spreading the infection. It is also possible that measles can spread through contact with respiratory secretions or with infected surfaces, though this is less significant. The virus is one of the most contagious human pathogens, with a basic reproduction number of between 12 and 18 (i.e. in a community without immunity, one infected person is expected to pass the disease to this number of others). Because of this, the threshold for herd immunity is high – a minimum of 95% of the population should be vaccinated in order to prevent the disease spreading among those without immunity.

The virus is inactivated by ultraviolet radiation, heat, trypsin, acidic environments, and ether; it is not easily spread by contact with infected surfaces or objects (fomites).

== Diagnosis ==
Symptoms of measles begin after an incubation period of about 10 days after exposure to the measles virus; they comprise fever, cough, runny nose, and conjunctivitis that worsen in severity over 4 days of appearing. Other diseases that may appear similar to measles include rubella, scarlet fever, erythema infectiosum, and roseola. Koplik spots are indicative of measles, but are hard to spot, transient and easily missed. The measles rash can easily be confused with other illnesses causing rashes. Laboratory confirmation is therefore strongly recommended, especially in areas where measles is uncommon.

Laboratory tests for measles comprise either detection of measles-specific IgM antibodies in a blood sample, or detection of measles virus RNA from throat, nasal or urine specimen by using the RT-PCR (reverse transcription polymerase chain reaction) assay. Both tests are most effective if samples are collected between 1 and 3 days after the onset of the measles rash.

== Prevention ==
Share of children fully vaccinated against measles

=== Vaccination ===
Measles can be prevented in an individual by vaccination.

In places where measles is eliminated, it is generally recommended that children be immunized against measles using the MMR vaccine (measles, mumps, and rubella); the first dose at at 12–18 months of age with a second dose a few months later. In active outbreaks, an additional dose is recommended for infants between 6–11 months of age. The MMR vaccine is 95% effective for preventing measles after one dose if the vaccine is given to a child who is twelve months of age or older; if a second dose of the MMR vaccine is given, it will provide immunity in 97-99% of children. Mild reactions to the injection may include pain at the injection site, fever, and a rash; severe adverse reactions to vaccination are rare.

In places where measles is endemic, the World Health Organization recommends immunization at 9 months of age and again at 18 months of age. The vaccine is less effective when given earlier; the rate of antibody development when the initial dose is given at 9 months of age is 85-90%.

There have been false claims of an association between the MMR vaccine and autism; this incorrect concern has reduced the rate of vaccination and increased the number of cases of measles where immunization rates became too low to maintain herd immunity. Additionally, there have been false claims that measles infection protects against cancer.

=== Newborns ===
During pregnancy, antibodies to measles are able to cross the placenta into fetal circulation, providing passive immunity to the newborn. This immunity wanes over the first 6 to 12 months of life.

=== Herd immunity ===
Herd immunity at population level may provide may provide a degree of protection. Because measles is highly infective, more than 95% of the population must be vaccinated in order to provide protection to the minority who are not immune. Individuals may nevertheless become infected if they encounter a person carrying the infection.

=== Post exposure ===
There are two treatment options available if a person without immunity is exposed to possible infection (post-exposure prophylaxis, PEP). The first (and preferable) option is a dose of the MMR vaccine, given within 72 hours of exposure. If this is contraindicated, injection or infusion of measles antibodies is effective up to the seventh day after exposure, but this does not confer permanent immunity.

== Treatment ==
There is no specific antiviral treatment if measles develops. Instead the medications are generally aimed at treating secondary infections, maintaining good hydration with adequate fluids, and pain relief. Supportive treatment can include ibuprofen or paracetamol (acetaminophen) to reduce fever and pain and, if required, a fast-acting medication to dilate the airways for cough.

Vitamin A deficiency (VAD) is common in many low and middle income countries. A number of studies conducted conducted in countries where VAD is prevalent concluded that when children infected with measles were supplemented with vitamin A, there was a significant reduction in the severity of measles infection. The WHO and UNICEF recommend physician-administered vitamin A supplementation if this is a risk factor for an infected child.

== Prognosis ==
Measles most commonly affects children, who have not acquired immunity through either vaccination or prior infection. Most people recover from measles, though in some cases, serious complications can occur; about 1 in 4 individuals will be hospitalized. Complications are more likely in children under age 5, adults over age 20, and pregnant people. Pneumonia is the most common fatal complication of measles infection and accounts for a large proportion of measles-related deaths.

Mortality in developed countries is relatively low. In England and Wales from 2020 to 2025 there were 16 deaths arising from 25,000 cases (0.06%). In the United States, it is estimated that between 1 and 3 children will die per 1,000 cases (0.1–0.3%). In populations with high levels of malnutrition and a lack of adequate healthcare, mortality can be as high as 10%.

For people who have previously been infected or fully vaccinated, reinfection is rare but can occur in a milder form.

== Epidemiology ==
Reported cases of measles

Prior to the introduction of measles vaccine in 1963, measles was an endemic disease worldwide – meaning that it was constantly present, to a greater or lesser extent – in every part of the globe. It was estimated to cause approximately 135 million cases and 6 million deaths worldwide every year. With the introduction of vaccination programs, incidence of the disease was progressively reduced over the following decades, with laboratory confirmed cases reaching a low point of 159,000 in 2020, although there has been some resurgence subsequently. Because of regional under-reporting in areas with poor health systems, the estimated number of annual infections remains at 10 million.

Reported (laboratory confirmed) cases
WHO-Region	1980	1990	2000	2010	2020	2021	2022	2023
African Region	1,240,993	481,204	520,102	199,174	115,369	88,789	97,237	71,384
Region of the Americas	257,790	218,579	1,754	247	9,996	682	47	49
Eastern Mediterranean Region	341,624	59,058	38,592	10,072	6,769	26,089	56,401	79,688
European Region	492,660	185,818	37,421	30,625	10,945	99	825	22,137
South-East Asia Region	199,535	224,925	78,558	54,228	9,389	6,448	49,201	82,667
Western Pacific Region	1,319,640	155,490	177,052	49,460	6,605	1,064	1,442	4,540
Worldwide	3,852,242	1,325,074	853,479	343,806	159,073	123,171	205,153	260,465

In order to be considered measles-free, the WHO requires that a country must have no locally transmitted cases of the disease over a period of 12 months. During the 21st century, many countries achieved measles-free status; this includes much of Europe and the Western Pacific, as well as the entire region of the Americas. As of August 2026, a resurgence of measles (attributed to reduced vaccine coverage and vaccine hesitancy) has resulted in loss of measles-free status in a number of countries, including Canada (and by extension, the region of the Americas), the UK, Spain, and Austria.

=== Genetic analysis ===
Historically, genetic variants of the measles virus have been divided into 24 genotypes, grouped into 8 clades designated A to H. Despite this variation, there is only one serotype, meaning that immunity (once acquired) is effective against all clades. All vaccines are derived from laboratory cultures of Clade A. In 2003, 18 genotypes were in circulation globally; as of 2024 only two genotypes (B3 and D8) could be detected, indicating that vaccination programs had interrupted several chains of transmission.

=== COVID-19 ===
Globally, reported measles cases decreased year-on year in the 21st century, but plateaued at 132,000 in 2016. In the following years, incidence increased to 874,000 by 2019. The increase was attributed to a failure in vaccination programs, principally in the poorest countries of the world. Cases dropped again in 2020, this credited to COVID-19 pandemic emergency measures such as lockdowns and social distancing which curtailed transmission of measles.

However the COVID-19 pandemic hindered vaccination campaigns in at least 68 countries. In February 2024, the World Health Organization warned that measles cases were increasing, and that more than half of the world was at risk of a measles outbreak due to disruptions of health systems and vaccination schedules during the years of COVID-19 pandemic.

In November 2024, the WHO and CDC reported that measles cases increased by 20% in 2023, primarily due to insufficient vaccine coverage in the world's poorest and conflict-affected regions, increasing from about 8.6 to 10.3 million cases. Nearly half of the major outbreaks and 64% of the individual cases occurred in Africa.

=== Global efforts ===
In 2000, the WHO established the Global Measles and Rubella Laboratory Network (GMRLN) to provide laboratory surveillance for measles, rubella, and congenital rubella syndrome. Before this, individual countries or regions were responsible for efforts to monitor and control measles. In 2001, the American Red Cross, CDC, UNICEF, the United Nations Foundation, and the WHO joined to form the Measles Initiative, aiming to reduce deaths in developing countries. This was later expanded to include the Gates Foundation and GAVI, and renamed the Measles & Rubella Partnership with the objective of eliminating both measles and rubella. As of 2026, this partnership has supported governments to deliver more than 3.86 billion doses of measles vaccine.

=== Europe ===
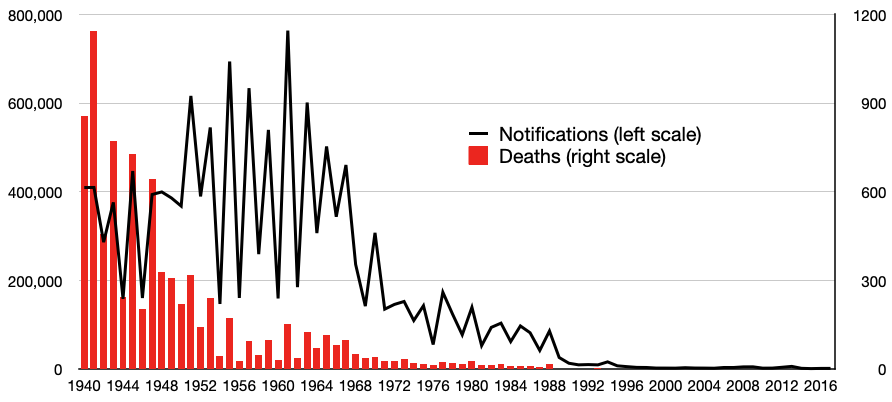
Incidence of and deaths due to measles in England and Wales between 1940 and 2017

In England and Wales, though deaths from measles were uncommon, they averaged about 500 per year in the 1940s. Deaths diminished with the improvement of medical care in the 1950s, but the incidence of the disease did not reduce until vaccination was introduced in the late 1960s. Wider coverage was achieved in the 1980s with the measles, mumps and rubella, MMR vaccine.

In 2013–14, there were almost 10,000 cases in 30 European countries. Most cases occurred in unvaccinated individuals and over 90% of cases occurred in Germany, Italy, Netherlands, Romania, and United Kingdom. Between October 2014 and March 2015, a measles outbreak in the German capital of Berlin resulted in at least 782 cases.

In 2016, a record low of 5,273 cases in Europe were reported. 2017 saw an estimated measles vaccine coverage of 95% Europe-wide for the first dose and 90% for the second dose; nevertheless, regional gaps existed in coverage. Despite this, 2017 saw 21,315 cases, with 35 deaths. In 2018, reported cases in the region increased to 82,596 with 72 deaths; WHO EpiData shows that Ukraine had the most cases (53,218).

In 2019, the United Kingdom, Albania, the Czech Republic, and Greece lost their measles-free status due to ongoing and prolonged spread of the disease in these countries. In the first 6 months of 2019, 90,000 cases occurred in Europe.

A significant increase in measles cases in Europe occurred in 2024, with 127,350 being reported. This was the highest caseload in the region since 1997, representing a third of global measles cases. The major centre of the resurgent outbreak appeared to be Romania where 30,692 cases were reported.

=== Americas ===
As a result of widespread vaccination, the disease was declared eliminated from the Americas in 2016. However, there were cases again in 2017, 2018, 2019, 2020, and 2025 in this region.

==== Brazil ====
The spread of measles had been interrupted in Brazil in 2016, with the last-known case twelve months earlier in the state of Ceará.

Brazil won a measles elimination certificate by the Pan American Health Organization in 2016, but the Ministry of Health has proclaimed that the country has struggled to keep this certificate, since two outbreaks had already been identified in 2018, one in the state of Amazonas and another one in Roraima, in addition to cases in other states (Rio de Janeiro, Rio Grande do Sul, Pará, São Paulo and Rondônia), totaling 1,053 confirmed cases until 1 August 2018. In these outbreaks, and in most other cases, the contagion was related to the importation of the virus, especially from Venezuela. This was confirmed by the genotype of the virus (D8) that was identified, which is the same that circulates in Venezuela.

==== Canada ====
In 2025, Canada lost its measles-free status, recording 5,462 cases during the year. This is attributed to a drop in vaccine coverage from 90% in 2019 to 82% in 2022 and 2023.

==== United States ====
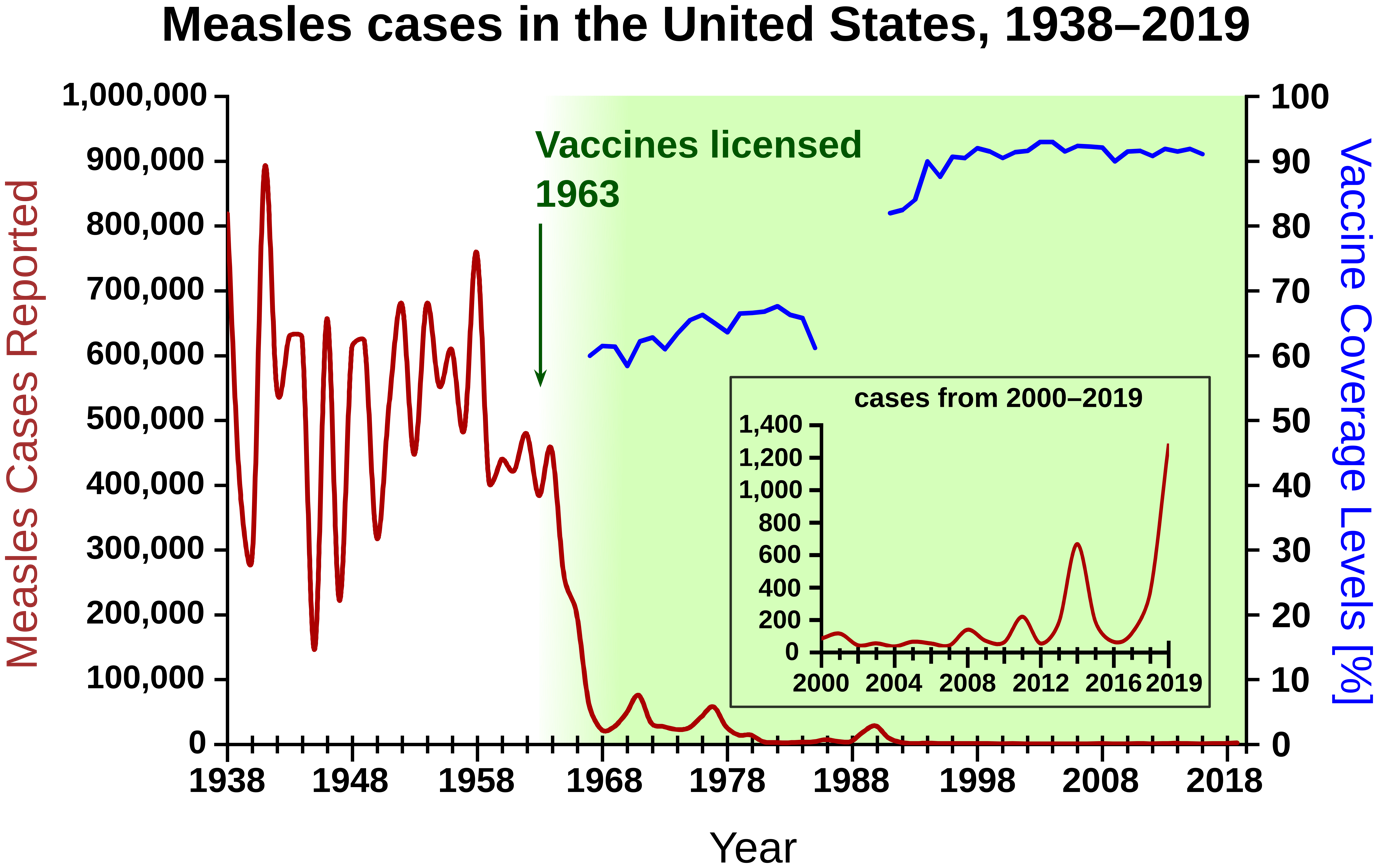
Measles cases in the U.S. from 1938 to 2019

In the United States, measles affected approximately 3,000 people per million in the 1960s before the vaccine was available. With consistent widespread childhood vaccination, this figure fell to 13 cases per million by the 1980s, and to about 1 case per million by 2000.

In 1991, an outbreak of measles in Philadelphia was centered at Faith Tabernacle Congregation, a faith-healing church that actively discouraged parishioners from vaccinating their children. Over 1,400 people were infected with measles and nine children died.

Before immunization in the United States, between three and four million cases occurred each year. The United States was declared free of circulating measles in 2000, with 911 cases from 2001 to 2011. In 2014 the CDC said endemic measles, rubella, and congenital rubella syndrome had not returned to the United States. Occasional measles outbreaks persist, however, because of cases imported from abroad, of which more than half are the result of unvaccinated U.S. residents who are infected abroad and infect others upon return to the United States. The CDC continues to recommend measles vaccination throughout the population to prevent outbreaks like these.

In 2014, an outbreak was initiated in Ohio when two unvaccinated Amish men harboring asymptomatic measles returned to the United States from missionary work in the Philippines. Their return to a community with low vaccination rates led to an outbreak that rose to include a total of 383 cases across nine counties. Of the 383 cases, 340 (89%) occurred in unvaccinated individuals.

From 4 January, to 2 April 2015, there were 159 cases of measles reported to the CDC. Of those 159 cases, 111 (70%) were determined to have come from an earlier exposure in late December 2014. This outbreak was believed to have originated from the Disneyland theme park in California. The Disneyland outbreak was held responsible for the infection of 147 people in seven U.S. states as well as Mexico and Canada, the majority of which were either unvaccinated or had unknown vaccination status. Of the cases 48% were unvaccinated and 38% were unsure of their vaccination status. The initial exposure to the virus was never identified.

In 2015, a U.S. woman in Washington state died of pneumonia, as a result of measles. She was the first fatality in the U.S. from measles since 2003. The woman had been vaccinated for measles and was taking immunosuppressive drugs for another condition. The drugs suppressed the woman's immunity to measles, and the woman became infected with measles; she did not develop a rash, but contracted pneumonia, which caused her death.

In June 2017, the Maine Health and Environmental Testing Laboratory confirmed a case of measles in Franklin County. This instance marks the first case of measles in 20 years for the state of Maine. In 2018, one case occurred in Portland, Oregon, with 500 people exposed; 40 of them lacked immunity to the virus and were being monitored by county health officials as of 2 July 2018. There were 273 cases of measles reported throughout the United States in 2018, including an outbreak in Brooklyn with more than 200 reported cases from October 2018 to February 2019. The outbreak was tied with population density of the Orthodox Jewish community, with the initial exposure from an unvaccinated child that caught measles while visiting Israel.

A resurgence of measles occurred during 2019, which has been generally tied to parents choosing not to have their children vaccinated as most of the reported cases occurred in people 19 years old or younger. Cases were first reported in Washington state in January, with an outbreak of at least 58 confirmed cases most within Clark County, which has a higher rate of vaccination exemptions compared to the rest of the state; nearly one in four kindergartners in Clark did not receive vaccinations, according to state data. This led Washington state governor Jay Inslee to declare a state of emergency, and the state's congress to introduce legislation to disallow vaccination exemption for personal or philosophical reasons. In April 2019, New York Mayor Bill de Blasio declared a public health emergency because of "a huge spike" in cases of measles where there were 285 cases centred on the Orthodox Jewish areas of Brooklyn in 2018, while there were only two cases in 2017. There were 168 more in neighboring Rockland County. Other outbreaks occurred in Santa Cruz County and Butte County in California, and the states of New Jersey and Michigan. As of April 2019, there have been 695 cases of measles reported in 22 states. As of April 2019, this is the highest number of measles cases since measles was declared eliminated in 2000. From January, to December 2019, 1,282 individual cases of measles were confirmed in 31 states. This is the greatest number of cases reported in the US since 1992. Of the 1,282 cases, 128 of the people who got measles were hospitalized, and 61 reported having complications, including pneumonia and encephalitis. Following the end of the 2019 outbreak, reported cases fell to pre-outbreak levels: 13 cases in 2020, 49 cases in 2021, and 121 cases in 2022.

As of February 2025, an outbreak of measles is ongoing amongst unvaccinated communities in Texas and New Mexico. On 26 February, the first measles death since 2015 was reported to be that of an unvaccinated school-aged child in West Texas. The confirmed number of measles cases in this outbreak is 124 as of 26 February 2025, according to the Texas Department of Health Services. Most are in children ages 5–17. As of March 2025, the CDC has recorded 483 confirmed cases across 20 states, 2 deaths and 70 hospitalized. This exceeds the entire 2024 total that was only 285.

As of November 17, 2026, the Pan American Health Organization declared that the USA was no longer measles-free. Vaccine skepticism and funding cuts contributed to this outcome, and it could take years for America to regain its measles-free status.

=== Southeast Asia ===
In the Vietnamese measles epidemic in spring of 2014, an estimated 8,500 measles cases were reported as of 19 April, with 114 fatalities; as of 30 May, 21,639 suspected measles cases had been reported, with 142 measles-related fatalities. In the Naga Self-Administered Zone in a remote northern region of Myanmar, at least 40 children died during a measles outbreak in August 2016 that was probably caused by lack of vaccination in an area of poor health infrastructure. Following the 2019 Philippines measles outbreak, 23,563 measles cases have been reported in the country with 338 fatalities. A measles outbreak also happened among the Malaysian Orang Asli sub-group of Batek people in the state of Kelantan from May 2019, causing the deaths of 15 from the tribe. In 2024, a measles outbreak was declared in the Bangsamoro region in the Philippines with at least 592 cases and 3 deaths.

=== Oceania ===
==== Australia ====
Measles is a notifiable disease, which is required to be reported to the National Notifiable Diseases Surveillance System. The NNDSS portal shows statistics on measles since 1991, showing that the high of 4,794 cases in 1994 dropped to 10 by 2005 after a significant public health campaign initiated in 1998. Numbers have varied since then, reducing to zero during the COVID-19 pandemic in Australia in 2021, but rising to 181 in 2025.

==== Samoa ====
A measles outbreak in Samoa in late 2019 has over 5,700 cases of measles and 83 deaths, out of a Samoan population of 200,000. Over three percent of the population were infected, and a state of emergency was declared from 17 November to 7 December. A vaccination campaign brought the measles vaccination rate from 31 to 34% in 2018 to an estimated 94% of the eligible population in December 2019.

=== Africa ===
The Democratic Republic of the Congo and Madagascar have reported the highest numbers of cases in 2019. However, cases have decreased in Madagascar as a result of nationwide emergency measles vaccine campaigns. As of August 2019 outbreaks were occurring in Angola, Cameroon, Chad, Nigeria, South Sudan and Sudan.

==== Madagascar ====
An outbreak of measles in 2018 has resulted in well beyond 115,000 cases and over 1,200 deaths.

==== Democratic Republic of Congo ====
An outbreak of measles with nearly 5,000 deaths and 250,000 infections occurred in 2019, after the disease spread to all the provinces in the country. Most deaths were among children under five years of age. The World Health Organization (WHO) has reported this as the world's largest and fastest-moving epidemic.

== History ==
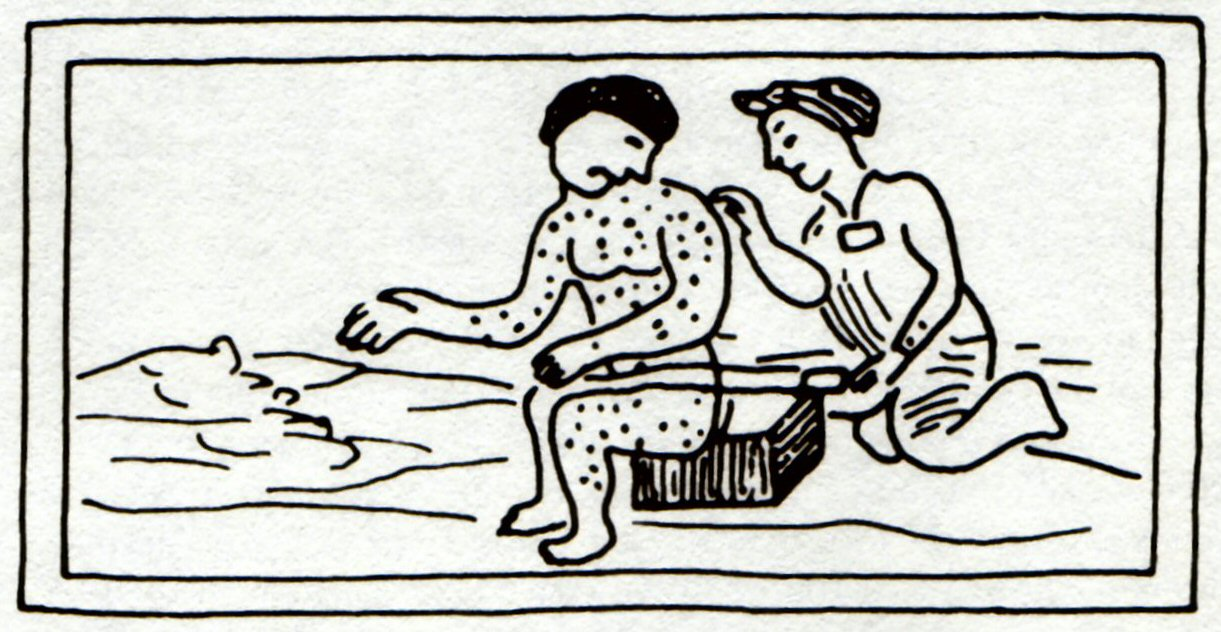
16th-century Aztec drawing of someone with measles

Measles is of zoonotic origin, having evolved from rinderpest, which infected cattle. A precursor of the measles began causing infections in humans as early as the 4th century BC or as late as after 500 AD. The Antonine Plague of 165–180 AD has been speculated to have been measles, but the actual cause of this plague is unknown and smallpox is a more likely cause. The first systematic description of measles as distinct from smallpox and chickenpox is credited to the Persian physician Muhammad ibn Zakariya al-Razi (860–932), who published The Book of Smallpox and Measles. He described it as "more to be dreaded than smallpox". It is believed that, at the time of Razi's book, outbreaks were still limited and the virus was not fully adapted to humans. Sometime between 1100 and 1200 AD, the measles virus fully diverged from rinderpest, becoming a distinct virus that infects humans. This agrees with the observation that measles requires a susceptible population of over 500,000 to sustain an epidemic, a situation that occurred in historic times following the growth of medieval European cities.

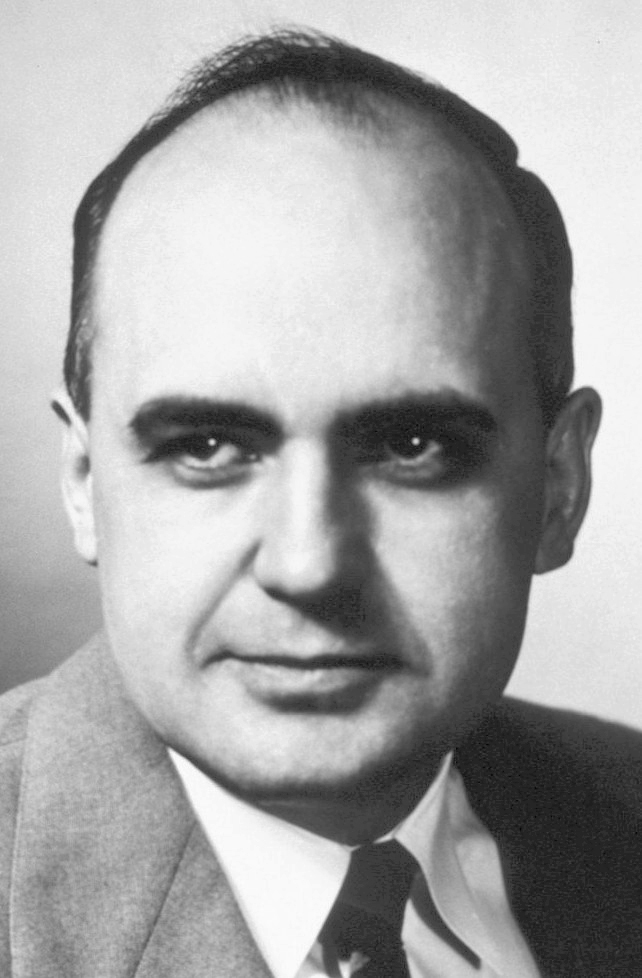
Maurice Hilleman's measles vaccine is estimated to prevent one million deaths per year.

Measles is an endemic disease, meaning it has been continually present in a community and many people develop resistance. In populations not exposed to measles, exposure to the new disease can be devastating. In 1529, a measles outbreak in Cuba killed two-thirds of those indigenous people who had previously survived smallpox. Two years later, measles was responsible for the deaths of half the population of Honduras, and it has ravaged Mexico, Central America, and the Inca civilization.

The 1846 measles outbreak in the Faroe Islands was unusual for being well studied. Measles had not been seen on the islands for 60 years, so almost no residents had any acquired immunity. Three-quarters of the residents got sick, and more than 100 (1–2%) died from it before the epidemic burned itself out. Peter Ludvig Panum observed the outbreak and determined that measles was spread through direct contact of contagious people with people who had never had measles. He elucidated the immunity conferred by illness as well as its incubation period by studying this outbreak.

Measles killed 20 percent of Hawaii's population in the 1850s. In 1875, measles killed over 40,000 Fijians, approximately one-third of the population. In the 19th century, the disease killed more than half of the Great Andamanese population.

In 1914, a statistician for the Prudential Insurance Company estimated from a survey of 22 countries that 1% of all deaths in the temperate zone were caused by measles. He observed also that 1–6% of cases of measles ended fatally, the difference depending on age (0–3 being the worst), social conditions (e.g. overcrowded tenements) and pre-existing health conditions.

=== Vaccination ===
Prior to the introduction of vaccines, more than 2 million deaths and 30 million cases were estimated to occur annually around the world. In 1954, John Enders and Thomas C. Peebles isolated the measles virus from a 13-year-old boy from the United States, David Edmonston. Enders was one of the researchers experienced with propagating poliovirus, paving the way for the Salk vaccine, and used similar techniques to grow the Edmonston strain in human kidney tissue later that year, then amniotic membrane tissue culture, and finally chick embryo culture. Their work spanned three years and created a virus capable of replicating and generating immunity, but not of causing disease, a process called attenuation. While at Merck, Maurice Hilleman further attenuated the Edmonston B strain to develop the first successful measles vaccine, which became widely available in the United States in 1963. It was associated with post-immunization reactions including fever and rash. In an effort to reduce reactions, it was further attenuated to produce the Schwartz strain (introduced in 1965, no longer used) and the Edmonston-Enders strain (introduced in 1968). Edmonston B was discontinued in 1975. A killed measles vaccine was given between 1963 and 1967 but was discontinued in favor of the live-attenuated vaccine due to the risk of atypical measles and inferior protection. The measles vaccine was combined with the mumps vaccine and rubella vaccine, which are similar live vaccines given at the same ages, to create the MMR vaccine. It was licensed for use in the United States in 1971. The MMR vaccine was combined with the varicella vaccine to create the MMRV vaccine, which was licensed in 2005.

== Society and culture ==
German anti-vaccination campaigner and HIV/AIDS denialist Stefan Lanka posed a challenge on his website in 2011, offering a sum of €100,000 for anyone who could scientifically prove that measles is caused by a virus and determine the diameter of the virus. He posited that the illness is psychosomatic and that the measles virus does not exist. When provided with overwhelming scientific evidence from various medical studies by German physician David Bardens, Lanka did not accept the findings, forcing Bardens to appeal in court. The initial legal case ended with the ruling that Lanka was to pay the prize. However, on appeal, Lanka was ultimately not required to pay the award because the submitted evidence did not meet his exact requirements. The case received wide international coverage that prompted many to comment on it, including neurologist, well-known skeptic and science-based medicine advocate Steven Novella, who called Lanka "a crank".

As outbreaks easily occur in undervaccinated populations, the disease is seen as a test of sufficient vaccination within a population. Measles outbreaks have been on the rise in the United States, especially in communities with lower rates of vaccination. A different vaccine distribution within a single territory by age or social class may define different general perceptions of vaccination efficacy. It is often introduced to a region by travelers from other countries and it typically spreads to those who have not received the measles vaccination.
