= Fitzek =

Fitzek is a surname. Notable people with the surname include:

- Peter Fitzek (born 1965), German political activist
- Sebastian Fitzek (born 1971), German writer and journalist
