= Peter Fitzek =

German political activist

- Born: 12 August 1965 (age 61); East Germany
- Criminal charges: Traffic offences, intentional bodily harm and insult
- Criminal status: Convicted

Peter Fitzek (born 12 August 1965) is a German political activist who proclaims himself "Peter I of the Kingdom of Germany". Fitzek spread antisemitic conspiracy theories and challenged the legitimacy of the German state.

Fitzek was the self-proclaimed "king" of a fantasy state he founded in Wittenberg, which he called the "Kingdom of Germany." Fitzek also operated his own bank and several insurance companies for several years without permission. In May 2025, the Federal Minister of the Interior banned the organization as a criminal gang and Fitzek was arrested for, among other things, being the suspected ringleader of a criminal organization.

== Life ==
Fitzek is a trained chef. He claims to have achieved a "vice European championship title of all martial arts" in an "open European championship" in an unknown martial art in Zurich in 1994. It is believed that this refers to Sambo, which comes from Russia. In 2000 he opened a bookstore for esoteric literature.

In 2016, Fitzek was sentenced to three months in prison for traffic offences, and his premises were searched by police in the course of a financial regulation investigation. In 2017, Fitzek was sentenced to three years and eight months in prison for operating a bank without a license and embezzling his clients' money, though the conviction was later quashed.

Fizek is networking with groups and persons of Neue Rechte, like Jürgen Elsässer as well as Anti-Corona Movement activists like Michael Ballweg.

In 2025, Fitzek was arrested for running unregulated financial systems as part of his movement, the Kingdom of Germany.

== Kingdom of Germany ==
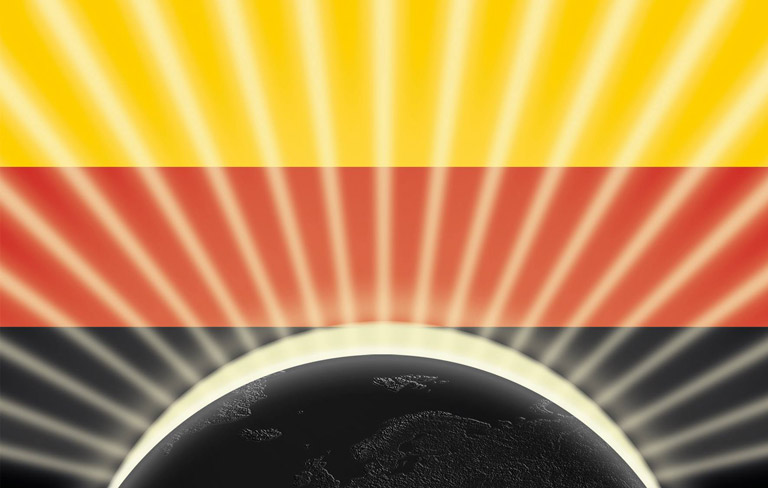
Flags used by the Kingdom of Germany of which Fitzek claims to be king

Fitzek developed a kingdom, based on a mixture of Germanic new medicine and esoteric political theories. According to its founding certificate, the Kingdom of Germany (KRD) group was founded in September 2012 in Lutherstadt Wittenberg, Saxony-Anhalt. He promotes the KRD by proclaiming that companies within KRD are tax and declaration-free. In 2023, there were a number of illegal companies nationwide that call themselves “Company in the KRD”. The claim is misleading because joining the KRD does not exempt from paying taxes to the Federal Republic of Germany.

Kingdom of Germany (Königreich Deutschland, KRD) claims to have about 5,000 members and its own currency, a bank, and social security. KRD consists of several properties around the city of Wittenberg, southwest of Berlin. There the Kingdom opened their headquarters “Wittenberg Light Center” on the site of a former meat canning factory. There KRD holds various esoteric day and weekend seminars. The content of the seminar “CANCER in the light of the latest findings” includes, among other things, the ideas of the Germanic New Medicine of the cancer miracle healer Ryke Geerd Hamer.

At the beginning of 2022, the KRD was able to acquire two properties in Saxony. The group intends to build self-sufficient structures there and create a self-governing “national territory”.

KRD representative offices were forcibly closed. KRD's illegal health insurance company GemeinwohlKasse was closed by BaFin in February 2023. Fitzek continued the unauthorized business despite administrative enforcement measures.

At the end of November 2023, the Federal Financial Supervisory Authority BaFin searched branches of the sect in 10 federal states. With 200 officers supported by officers of German Bundesbank and federal and state criminal and riot police. BaFin collected evidence of illicit financial transactions in the Kingdom of Germany as well as the connections and networks of this association, as banking and insurance transactions were carried out without permission.

The group has been under surveillance by German intelligence services, who consider the group a potential threat. BfV classifies KRD as an extremist group.

KRD aims to override the current legal system of democratic Germany and replace it with its own system in which democratic principles and laws should have no validity. In its military constitution, the kingdom writes that every German should be taught basic knowledge about self-defense with and without weapons. Since state order is not accepted, violence against it is legitimized as “self-defense” by KRD.

== Ban and trial ==
In 2025, the German government banned the Kingdom of Germany, with the Public Prosecutor General arresting Fitzek and three of his top lieutenants. The BfV describes Fitzek’s activity as a "simulation of a state" by "Reichsbürger" (Citizens of the Reich) and "Selbstverwalter" (self-governing individuals)".

In November 2026, the trial against Fitzek, Benjamin M., Martin S., and Mathias Blaul began before the Higher Regional Court (OLG) of Düsseldorf. All four have been in pre-trial detention since the organization was banned on May 13, 2025. Bleul is alleged to have taken on leadership roles within the group starting in 2016 and, in his capacity as head of the "bank," to have assisted Fitzek’s group in conducting unauthorized deposit-taking business.

Fitzek faces charges including the following: founding and leading a criminal organization; operating an illegal banking and insurance system; and issuing a private currency without official authorization. Through these activities, the group allegedly generated approximately 10 million euros between 2020 and 2025.

He is also accused of tax evasion amounting to roughly 2 million euros, stemming in part from the failure to remit payroll taxes and social security contributions.

Furthermore, he is charged with establishing a fictitious "registration office" that issued forged identification documents, as well as withholding employee wages and engaging in organized document forgery.
