= Stefan Lanka =

German conspiracy theorist and anti-vaccination activist

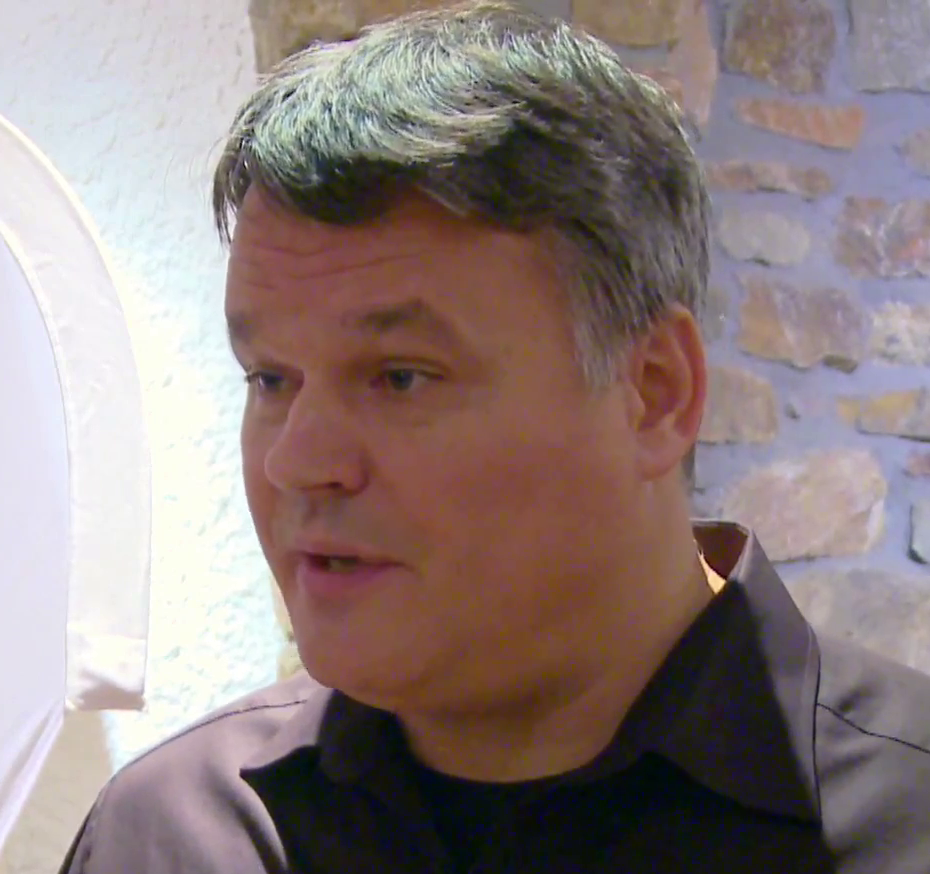
Dr. Stefan Lanka, PhD

Stefan Thomas Josef Lanka (born 1963 in Langenargen ) is a German conspiracy theorist and anti-vaccination activist who advocates for various scientifically refuted positions, such as AIDS denial. He became known to a wider public through a trial concerning his denial of the existence of the measles virus.

== Life and work ==
Stefan Lanka was born in 1963 on Lake Constance. He studied biology at the University of Konstanz, where he submitted his diploma thesis on "Investigations into virus infection in marine brown algae" in 1989. In 1994, he received his doctorate from the same institution with a dissertation on " Molecular biological studies of virus infection in Ectocarpus siliculosus (Phaeophyceae).

In 1997, Lanka, together with Karl Krafeld, founded the Association for Science, Medicine, and Human Rights (Verein für Wissenschaft, Medizin und Menschenrechte e. V.), which disseminated many highly dubious and, in some cases, dangerous hypotheses to the public. This association later became the publisher klein-klein. Since 2003, Lanka has operated the anti-vaccination website and the magazine of the same name, "Wissenschafftplus." Lanka also contacted Ryke Geerd Hamer, who also advocated very strange theories. In 2006, Lanka was fined for insulting a public prosecutor. In 2007, he was convicted again for insulting the head of the Stuttgart Health Department. In 2010, Lanka insulted employees of the Bautzen District Office, accusing them of "criminal energy and idiocy" in a fax. Lanka also received a penal order for insulting Reinhard Kurth, then president of the Robert Koch Institute.

== Conspiracy theories ==
Lanka is of the opinion that no viruses exist that cause disease. For example, Lanka hypothesizes that AIDS is not caused by an HIV virus; rather, AIDS was invented to test chemotherapy drugs like AZT on homosexual men . He also believes that the H5N1 bird flu is not caused by a virus. He describes modern medicine as the most important pillar of dictatorships and undemocratic governments. He also denies that Ebola fever is transmitted by viruses ( Ebola viruses ).

In an interview with the newspaper FAKTuell, which is close to the so-called German New Medicine, Lanka said: "Biological structures, on the other hand, which are supposed to do something negative, have never been seen. The basis of biological life is togetherness, is symbiosis, and there is no room for war and destruction. War and destruction in biological life is the creation of sick and criminal minds." In doing so, he contradicts undisputed findings in toxicology, according to which the most powerful poisons are of biological nature (e.g. snake venom, plant toxins, fungal toxins, botulinum toxin ). At the same time, his statement contradicts the fact that, for example, poisons play an important role in nature, for example in defense against predators or in hunting. Lanka's one-sided portrayal of evolution as a process of purely cooperative interactions contradicts the biological insight that competition for resources ( food, living space, sexual partners ) and "eat and be eaten" are also important driving forces of evolution.

He also expressed conspiracy-theoretical views on the measures taken against the COVID-19 pandemic, especially the SARS-CoV-2 vaccines .

Lanka spreads his unscientific theories on the Internet, in lectures, and in books.

== Measles trial ==
In 2011, Stefan Lanka offered a prize of €100,000 for proving the existence and determining the size of the measles virus, whose existence he disputes based on his theories. The physician David Bardens therefore sent Lanka six scientific publications from renowned medical journals that prove the existence of the virus. Since Lanka had repeatedly refused to pay the prize money, Bardens went to court in early 2014 to claim the prize money. On March 12, 2015, the Ravensburg Regional Court ruled against Lanka, ordering him to pay the prize money because the court found that the criteria of the competition had been met both formally and substantively. Lanka announced that he intended to appeal. In September 2015, the Tettnang District Court confirmed receipt of the payment of €121,000, thus annulling the arrest warrant issued shortly before against Lanka. David Bardens was able to claim the prize money after posting a security deposit of €110,000, despite the appeal, as the judgment was provisionally enforceable. The appeal was submitted to the Stuttgart Higher Regional Court (OLG).

In the proceedings in Stuttgart, there was a turning point in the process: the "anti-vaccination activist does not have to pay." The reason for this decision of 16 February 2016 lies in the special nature of a competition : the promoter (Lanka) had wanted a single paper with the evidence, whereas the plaintiff had submitted several publications which could only provide pieces of evidence that required further inference. Therefore, the appeal was essentially upheld. The press spokesman for the Higher Regional Court, Stefan Schüler, emphasized, however, that according to the expert reports obtained, the studies submitted by the plaintiff (Bardens), when viewed holistically, provided "both evidence of the existence of the measles viruses and information about their diameter."

Following the judgment of the Stuttgart Higher Regional Court, Bardens filed an appeal against non-admission with the Federal Court of Justice (BGH). This appeal was dismissed by the BGH on 20 January 2017. The OLG's judgment is therefore final.

== Classification by science and criticism ==
Lanka is ignored in academic discourse due to his unscientific theories. However, some physicians and scientists point out the dangers his statements could pose for laypeople: where there is no virus, there is no need to take precautions. This could lead to dangerously lax contraceptive measures, which would then also lead to an increase in sexually transmitted diseases. Because Lanka speaks out against vaccinations, he is seen as a "poster child" in the anti-vaccination scene; this contributes to the spread of preventable diseases. Lanka explains the outbreak of measles in kindergartens by the premature separation of children from their mothers.

Critics also criticize Lanka for his positive references to the so-called Germanic New Medicine of Ryke Geerd Hamer .

== Negative awards ==
In 2015, Lanka received the negative award " Goldenes Brett vorm Kopf " (Golden Board in Front of the Head).

== Selected publications ==
- Studies on virus infection in marine brown algae. Diploma thesis, University of Konstanz, 1989, (online)
- Molecular biological studies of virus infection in Ectocarpus siliculosus (Phaeophyceae) . Dissertation, University of Konstanz, 1994.
- with M. Klein, R. Knippers and DG Müller: Coat protein of the Ectocarpus siliculosus virus. In: Virology. 206(1), 10 Jan 1995, pp. 520–526. PMID 7831806
- with M. Klein, R. Knippers and D. Müller: Sum single-stranded regions in the genome of the Ectocarpus siliculosus virus. In: Virology. Volume 202, No. 2, August 1, 1994, pp. 1076–1078. PMID 8030215
- with M. Klein, U. Ramsperger, DG Müller and R. Knippers: Sum genome structure of a virus infecting the marine brown alga Ectocarpus siliculosus. In: Virology. Volume 193, No. 2, April 1993, pp. 802–811. PMID 8460486
- with Karl Krafeld: The International Criminal Code Demands the Overcoming of Conventional Medicine! With analyses of the global AIDS and vaccination crimes and a contribution on the life-affirming medicine of the future, the new medicine of Dr. Ryke Geerd Hamer. Klein-klein-Verlag, Stuttgart 2004, ISBN 3-937342-11-7
- with Veronika Widmer and Susanne Brix: The Measles Fraud: The Measles Vaccination, SSPE, School Exclusions, Compulsory Vaccination; Measles Disease from the Perspective of New Medicine and Homeopathy. Klein-klein-Verlag, Stuttgart 2006, ISBN 3-937342-16-8
- with Veronika Widmer: Everything about the flu, influenza, and vaccinations. Klein-klein-Verlag, Stuttgart 2006, ISBN 3-937342-22-2
- Avian Flu: The US War Against Humanity. Klein-Klein-Verlag, Stuttgart 2006, ISBN 3-937342-15-X
- with Karl Krafeld: Vaccination and AIDS: The New Holocaust – the German Justice System is Responsible! Klein-klein-Verlag, Stuttgart 2007, ISBN 978-3-937342-19-1
- Ursula Stoll and Stefan Lanka: Praxis Neue Medizin Verlag, Schwäbisch Hall 2020, ISBN 978-3-942689-22-9, p. 210 .
