= 2019 Pacific Northwest measles outbreak =

Measles outbreak in the Portland metropolitan area

- Date: December 31, 2018
- Location: Portland metropolitan area and Hawaii; 45°38′N 122°36′W
- Type: Outbreak
- Cause: Measles morbillivirus and vaccine hesitancy
- First reporter: Public Health Department of Clark County
- Outcome: Clark County public health emergency (January 18, 2019); Washington state of emergency (January 25, 2019)
- Website: www.clark.wa.gov/public-health/measles-investigation

In early months of 2019, a measles outbreak occurred in the Portland metropolitan area, including the Clark County, Washington suburbs, in the United States. At the time, the outbreak was the largest outbreak in more than two decades; outbreaks in 2019 in areas including Brooklyn and Rockland County, New York have since seen far greater numbers of cases.

== Background ==
In late December 2018, the Public Health Department of Clark County, Washington identified a patient with a high fever and rash, which are symptoms characteristic of measles. This was Clark County's first confirmed case of measles. The case sparked immediate concern, as measles is a highly contagious disease: the virus can spread through coughing or sneezing, and it is infectious enough that 90% of people in close proximity to the patient, if unvaccinated, will contract measles. Measles is also highly contagious because, for up to two hours, it can live on both surfaces and in airspaces. The area where the outbreak began and spread is considered an anti-vaccination hotspot. In Clark County, the measles vaccination rate was 78% at the time of the outbreak, too low for effective herd immunity. The outbreak, which has struck mostly voluntarily non-immunized children, may have started at a Vancouver, Washington church attended by largely immigrant parents "who don't trust government – or vaccination programs" after residing in the former Soviet Union. The virus was reintroduced to the Pacific Northwest in December 2018 by an "international traveler" entering Clark County.

== History and progression of outbreak ==
Through the end of December 2018 and into January 2019, the number of measles cases in Clark County continued to increase, even after patients were placed in quarantine environments. Clark County public health officials identified that one of the measles patients from Oregon had been previously traveling through the Portland International Airport on January 7, which may have been related to more recent measles cases identified in the following weeks located in the states of California, Colorado, Connecticut, Georgia, Illinois, New Jersey, New York, Oregon, Texas, and Washington that emerged throughout January 2019.

On January 4, 2019, the Clark County health department advised the public that one case had been detected, and on January 15, two more were confirmed. On January 18, 2019, with 19 known cases of measles, Clark County officials declared a health emergency. On January 25, with 30 cases reported, Washington governor Jay Inslee declared a statewide medical state of emergency in response to the "extreme public health risk" and called on the Washington Military Department to assist. By January 28, 36 cases had been reported, one of which was in the Seattle area. Two children visiting Hawaii from the outbreak area, who had not been vaccinated and developed the disease, were quarantined on the Big Island in late January. By January 30, 40 cases had been confirmed. By January 31, there were 43 confirmed cases and the state of North Dakota sent a medical response team to aid the Northwest. By February 15, 53 cases had been identified, 47 in non-immunized individuals. By February 24, 65 cases had been confirmed in Clark County. By March 18, the number of confirmed cases reached 73.

=== County public health emergency and statewide state of emergency ===
On January 18, once 19 measles cases had been identified, a public health emergency was declared throughout Clark County, Washington by Eileen Quiring, the Clark County Council Chair. This public health emergency was declared to allow the county to access public health resources outside of those available in Clark County, as well as to raise public awareness about the outbreak to encourage citizens to take necessary health precautions.

On January 25, a state of emergency was declared throughout the entire state of Washington by Governor Jay Inslee. In the official proclamation, Governor Inslee stated that "the existence of 26 confirmed cases in the state of Washington creates an extreme public health risk that may quickly spread to other counties". Inslee's concluding point discussed the implications of the outbreak for the well-being of the state itself: "The measles outbreak and its effects impact the life and health of our people, as well as the economy of Washington State, and is a public disaster that affects life, health, property or the public peace."

== Personal belief exemptions ==
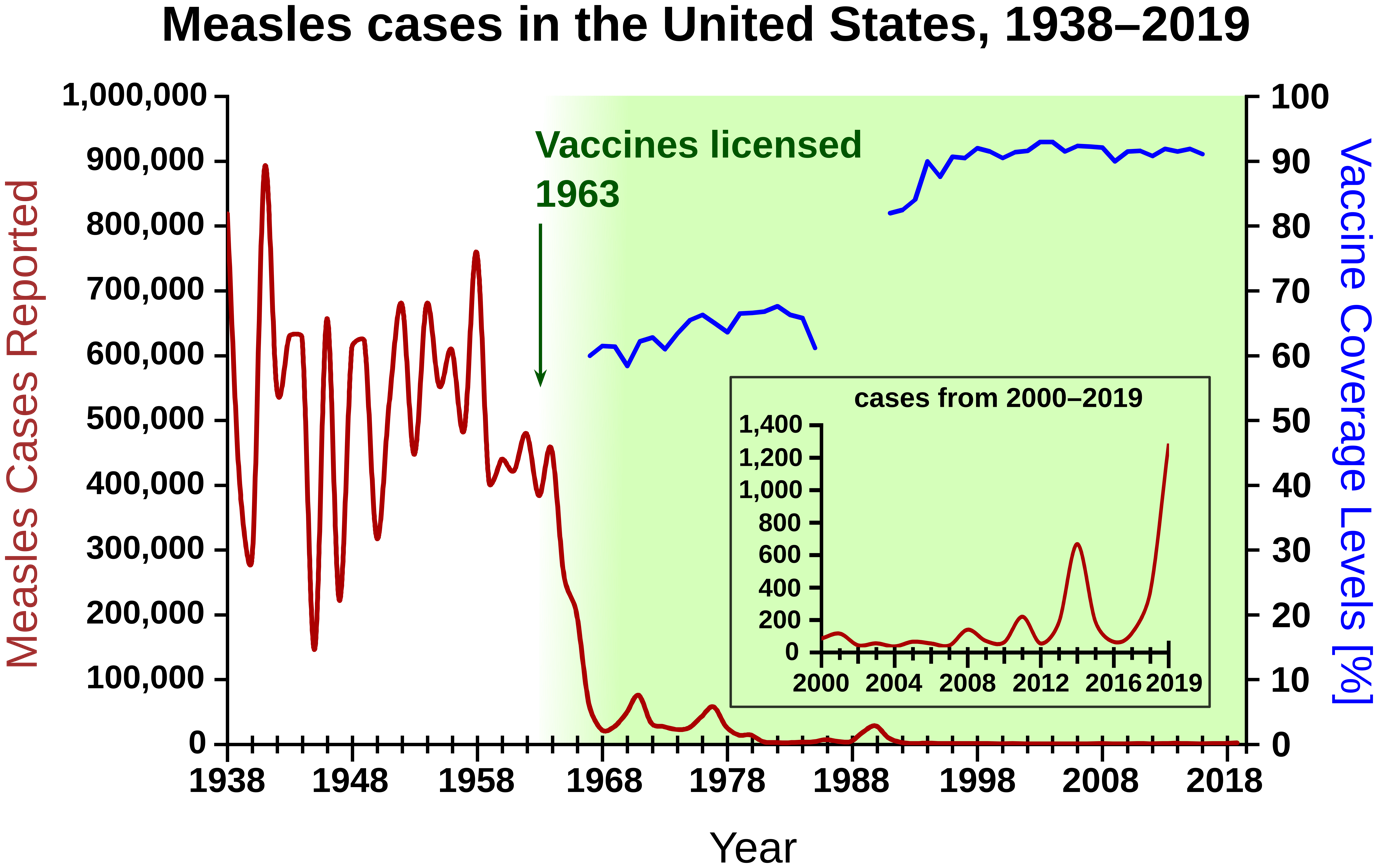
Incidence of measles has decreased drastically since the introduction of the MMR vaccine.

None of the 59 patients identified as of February 16, 2019 had received their complete set of two MMR (measles, mumps, rubella) vaccinations. Proper protection against measles, mumps, and rubella is best secured when children receive their first of two vaccine doses at 12 to 15 months of age, and their second dose between ages 4 to 6 years old. According to the Center for Disease Control, 91.9% of children aged 19 to 35 months had received at least one dose of the MMR vaccine in the year 2017. For the 2017–2018 academic year in Clark County, personal belief exemptions were filed on behalf of 7.9% children enrolled in school (kindergarten through grade 12). Personal belief exemptions (PBE) are forms that can be filled out by parents that excuse children from school-wide immunization requirements on the premise of moral, philosophical, or religious opposition. Only four of the 50 United States prohibit the utilization of PBEs entirely: Mississippi, West Virginia, California, and most recently in June 2019, New York. 18 states, including Oregon and Washington, however, allow individuals to opt out of vaccinations for themselves and/or their children on the premise of conflicting religious, moral, or personal beliefs. There is a direct positive correlation between strictness of state vaccination laws and rates of vaccination among states.

== Public response ==
CDC MMR Vaccine Information Statement.

As the measles outbreak grew, news coverage expanded across the country about not just the outbreak itself, but whether or not state or government mandated vaccination policies could have prevented its spread. According to Peter Hotez, dean of the National School of Tropical Medicine at Baylor College of Medicine, the Pacific Northwest is home to an outspoken population of anti-vaccination lobbyists that are likely in part responsible for the increased prevalence of personal belief exemptions throughout the region. Despite the area's relatively low immunization rates, health officials have observed a recent spike in the number of people throughout Washington and Oregon interested in receiving a measles vaccine. Public health administrator Shawn Brennan, an employee at Sea Mar Community Health Center in Vancouver, Washington explained that the increased public concern had pushed the clinic to order nearly 10 times as many vaccine doses than average.

Press coverage regarding the Pacific Northwest measles outbreak fostered nationwide interest in the spread of the disease. With the identification of more cases, public outrage continued to grow as the Washington Department of Health disclosed that, as of February 21, 2019, over one million dollars had been spent on the outbreak, largely to cover the costs of medical supplies and staff. “This is taxpayer money for something that could have been completely, utterly preventable in the first place,” explains Clark County public health director Alan Melnick, in reference to the MMR vaccine designed to prevent the spread of measles.

In the past decade, epidemiologists have linked decreased immunization rates to the increasing prevalence of social media. The Internet is the primary vessel in which misinformation about health consequences of vaccinations is spread, most of which is in relation to Andrew Wakefield’s study linking the MMR vaccine to the development of autism that has since been discredited by the CDC.

Social media platforms have taken their own individual efforts to prevent the dissemination of false information. As of September 2018, Pinterest had banned users from searching for content about vaccines. In January 2019, Facebook announced that it will be banning posts promoting anti-vaccination propaganda, and the website will no longer be suggesting anti-vaccination pages or groups for users to join. In February 2019, YouTube stated that any user or channel endorsing anti-vaccination content will be demonetized entirely, and not receive any funding for advertisements played before videos.

== See also ==
- Vaccine hesitancy
