= David Bardens =

German physician

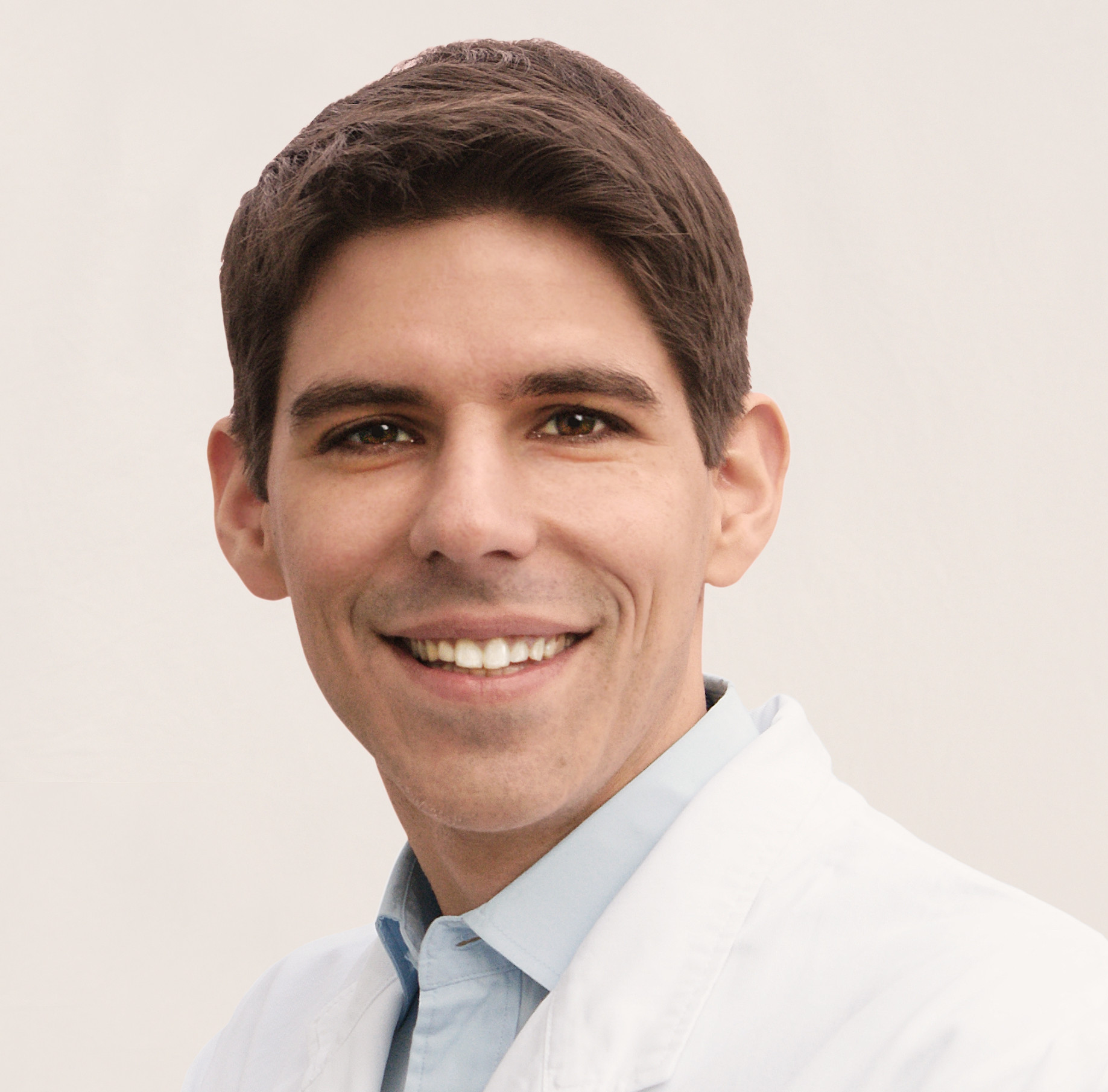
David Bardens

David Bardens (born 27 April 1984) is a German doctor whose case was reported internationally in 2015 after the district court of Ravensburg had ruled that he should get the €100,000 prize money that biologist Stefan Lanka had promised to anyone who could provide information about the existence and size of the measles virus. This award was overturned by the Higher Regional Court (Oberlandesgericht) Stuttgart in 2016. Although six scientific publications were submitted that collectively demonstrated the existence and size of the virus, they failed to meet the exact contest requirements as set by Lanka.

== Life ==
Bardens was born in Homburg, Saarland. After his service as a conscientious objector, Bardens trained as a paramedic in Mainz. In 2014, he pursued medicine at the Saarland University in Homburg with a dissertation on laparoscopic hysterectomy: new findings on surgical techniques, influencing factors and postoperative course of pain. During his studies, he worked as a teacher at a school of midwifery and as a perfusionist at the German Foundation for Organ Transplantation. Bardens also founded a food company in 2011 in Bremen to sell the anti-hangover lemonade freigeist. He worked after graduation for a short time as an assistant physician at the university's Women's Hospital in Homburg before moving to Sweden where he is currently a general practitioner. Bardens is also the grandson of the former German Member of Parliament Dr. Hans Bardens.

== The David Bardens vs. Stefan Lanka lawsuit ==
In November 2011, the anti-vaccine activist Stefan Lanka guaranteed a prize of €100,000 for proof of the existence of the measles virus, specifically the determination of its diameter. Lanka claims that measles is basically a skin irritation caused by a mixture of psychosomatic triggers and poisoning. Bardens contacted Lanka on 30 January 2012 for confirmation of the contest and eventually provided six publications as an answer to the questions.

Legal proceedings began on 29 September 2013, when Lanka declared that he would not accept the papers as the desired proof. A first court session took place in April 2014 and ended with the court's decision to halt procedures, to support its judgment with the scientific expertise of Andreas Podbielsky, virologist at the University of Rostock. The case was continued in March 2015 and ended with a decision in support of Bardens' statements.

The court's ruling received global press attention in light of the heavy campaigning of anti-vaccination protesters on web forums and in books. Bardens told the press weeks after the court's ruling that he could no longer appear as a public speaker without the protection of bodyguards.

Lanka eventually appealed the judgment. The case was re-evaluated at the Higher Regional Court (Oberlandesgericht) Stuttgart on 16 February 2016, where the original judgment was reversed. Six publications were submitted that collectively demonstrated the existence of measles virus and its diameter; however they failed to meet the contest requirements as set by Lanka who had stipulated that both details be covered in a single publication, something that would be unlikely to occur given the narrow focus of individual publications. Bardens commented on the case in an extensive interview on 5 May 2016 and announced his decision to appeal to Germany's Federal Court BGH. In December 2016, Bardens tried to get this ruling revised, but the court saw no reason to do so.

== Publications by Bardens ==
- Inhibition of hemoxygenase-1 improves survival after liver resection in jaundiced rats. Epub 2009.
- Bardens; et al. (November 2013). "Five minutes of extended assisted ventilation with an open umbilical trocar valve significantly reduces postoperative abdominal and shoulder pain in patients undergoing laparoscopic hysterectom". Eur J Obstet Gynecol Reprod Biol. 171 (1): 122–7. doi:10.1016/j.ejogrb.2013.08.014. PMID 23998556.
- Bardens; et al. (April 2014). "The impact of the body mass index (BMI) on laparoscopic hysterectomy for benign disease". Arch Gynecol Obstet. 289 (4): 803–7. doi:10.1007/s00404-013-3050-2. PMID 24113992. S2CID 22719852.
- Bardens; et al. (2012). "Comparison of Total and Supracervical Laparoscopic Hysterectomy for Benign Disease in a Collective of 200 Patients". Journal of Gynecologic Surgery. 28 (5): 333–337. doi:10.1089/gyn.2012.0016.
