= 2019 Kuala Koh measles outbreak =

Disease outbreak in Malaysia

- The site of the outbreak in 2019.
- Disease: Measles
- Pathogen: Measles virus
- Index case: 2 May 2019
- Confirmed cases: 43
- Suspected cases^{‡}: 113
- Deaths: 15 (total deaths) (Note: Since before the announcement of outbreak, including from complications of pneumonia but not acknowledged by the Health Ministry.); 4 (according to MOH) (Note: Since the announcement of outbreak, acknowledged by the Health Ministry.)

The 2019 Kuala Koh measles outbreak was a measles outbreak that occurred among the Orang Asli sub-group of Batek people in Kuala Koh Village in the state of Kelantan, Malaysia, from May until July. Following the sudden deaths of several villagers, the disease became a mystery among the villagers and public for nearly a month until it was identified by the Malaysian Health Ministry in mid-June as measles.

== Background of the disease ==
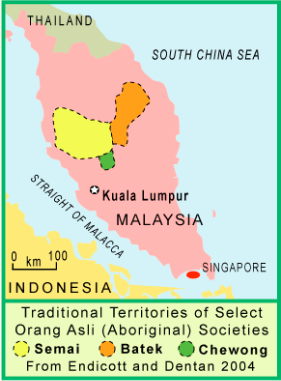
The range of the traditional territories of the Batek people in orange.

The sudden deaths of 14 Orang Asli villagers in Kuala Koh Village was at first considered a mystery with two people dying from pneumonia complications between 2 May and 7 June, while the remaining people's causes of death remain unknown as their bodies were buried by locals prior to reports of the outbreak. On 8 June, a further 83 villagers presented pneumonia with two of them, a 36-year-old woman and three-year-old baby, in critical condition. Thirty-seven of the villagers received outpatient treatment with 32 treated at Gua Musang Hospital, 11 at Kuala Krai Hospital, and another three at the Orang Asli Health Homestay. Another died on 16 June, bringing the total death toll to 15.

=== Villager claims ===
One of the villagers claimed that the deaths are caused by mining activity that is situated near the village. He revealed that his two daughters have been experiencing breathing difficulty for days and could not sleep at night; some of his neighbours died of the same disease. Despite knowing the nearby mining activities causing pollution to their water source, another villager claimed they have no other choice than to use the water for their daily activities.

== Official response, investigation, and conclusion ==
On 9 June, the Malaysian federal government through Deputy Prime Minister Wan Azizah Wan Ismail said they are investigating the cause as well the allegations of water pollution and promised stern action will be taken against the culprits if it is indeed found the deaths were caused by contamination on their water source. A similar statement was echoed by Water, Land and Natural Resources Minister Tengku Zulpuri Shah Raja Puji during his visit to the affected community. On 11 June, Deputy Prime Minister Wan Azizah called an emergency meeting for the unexplained deaths which was attended by a minister in the Prime Minister's Department, Waytha Moorthy Ponnusamy, Health Minister Dzulkefly Ahmad and Energy, Technology, Science, Climatic Change and Environment Minister Yeo Bee Yin.

Based on samples taken by the Environment Department from the manganese mine and water catchment areas close to the villagers settlement, the results on 12 June showed the water is free of hazardous contaminants and meet the standards for raw water. On the same day, the affected area was declared by police as a "red zone". Through further laboratory tests on 37 villagers in the area with similar symptoms of illness, the disease was finally confirmed to be measles on 15 June. Until 20 June, a further 43 measles cases are confirmed among the community with three more respiratory illnesses also being reported in the area.

The Malaysian Health Ministry said the cause of the spread among the Orang Asli community is due to low coverage of MMR immunisation which is attributed to the relatively low immunisation rate among the community with their nomadic lifestyle. Health Minister Dzulkefly Ahmad explained that although 61.5% of the villagers received their first measles, mumps, and rubella (MMR) shots, only 30% of them had their follow-up shots. Since the outbreak was announced, 113 cases has been reported in the affected area with a total 43 confirmed cases. Despite the relatively low deaths reported by the findings of Health Ministry, the latter was unable to confirm the post-mortems results on the skeletal remains of several more cases. The "red zone" declaration was lifted on 8 July after the area was declared safe for the public.

== See also ==
- Epidemiology of measles
