= Ryke Geerd Hamer =

German quack physician (1935–2017)

Ryke Geerd Hamer (17 May 1935 – 2 July 2017) was a German former physician and the originator of Germanic New Medicine (GNM), also formerly known as German New Medicine and New Medicine, a system of pseudo-medicine that purports to be able to cure cancer. The Swiss Cancer League described Hamer's approach as "dangerous, especially as it lulls the patients into a false sense of security, so that they are deprived of effective treatments."

Hamer held a licence to practice medicine from 1963 until 1986, when it was revoked for malpractice. His system came to public attention in 1995, when the parents of a child suffering from cancer refused medical treatment (chemical therapy or chemotherapy) in favour of Hamer's methods. Hamer was charged with malpractice and imprisoned in several European countries.

Hamer claimed that his method was a "Germanic" alternative to mainstream clinical medicine, which he claimed is part of a Jewish conspiracy to decimate non-Jews. He is the father of Dirk Hamer, who died of gunshot wounds allegedly inflicted by Vittorio Emanuele di Savoia. Former model and actress Birgit Hamer is his daughter.

== Biography ==
Ryke Geerd Hamer was born in Mettmann, North Rhine-Westphalia, Germany, in 1935. He received his high school diploma at age 18 and started medical and theological studies in Tübingen, where he met Sigrid Oldenburg, a medical student who later became his wife. At age 20, Hamer passed the preliminary examination in medicine, and in April 1962 passed his medical state examination in Marburg, Hesse. He was granted a professional license as a doctor of medicine in 1963. After having spent several years at the University Clinics of Tübingen and Heidelberg, Hamer completed his specialization in internal medicine in 1972. He also worked in several practices with his wife.

Hamer's license to practice medicine in Germany was revoked in 1986 by a court judgment, which was reconfirmed in 2003. As he continued to practice illegally, Hamer was investigated several times over allegations of malpractice and causing the deaths of patients. By 1997, Hamer owned clinics in Germany, Belgium, Italy, Austria, and the Netherlands. Hamer was arrested and jailed for twelve months in Germany from 1997 to 1998, and served a prison term from September 2004 to February 2006 in Fleury-Mérogis, France, on counts of fraud and unlicensed practice of medicine.

Hamer's habilitation thesis about the GNM at the University of Tübingen in 1986 was rejected after multiple examinations by several members of the medical faculty, who concluded that his work lacked scientific methods and reproducibility and his arguments did not support his theories. Hamer claimed that his system was verifiable and that the University of Trnava in Slovakia had already confirmed some of his theories. In fact, the University of Trnava has no real medical faculty and the documents which allegedly confirmed his view are neither available nor registered at the university. In 1999, that university also rejected his habilitation thesis.

Hamer lived in voluntary exile in Spain until March 2007, when Spanish medical authorities held him responsible for dozens of preventable deaths. He resided in Norway until his death from a stroke on 2 July 2017, age 82. The French news magazine L'Express reported that Hamer left a legacy of followers and imitators.

== Germanic new medicine ==
On 8 August 1978, Hamer's son, Dirk, was shot by the son of the last king of Italy, Vittorio Emanuele of Savoy, while asleep on a yacht off Cavallo and died on 7 December of that year. Sometime after Dirk's death, Hamer developed testicular cancer and thought there was a link between the two events, so he began to develop Germanic new medicine (GNM), which can be summarized in its "five biological laws":

- 1st law ("iron rule"): Severe diseases originate from a shock event which is experienced by the individual as very difficult, highly acute, dramatic, and isolating. The shock's psychological conflict content determines the location of the appearance of a focus of activity in the brain that can be seen in a CT scan as a set of concentric rings, called Hamer focus or HH (from German: Hamerscher Herd), which correspond to the location of the disease in the body. The subsequent development of the conflict determines the development of both the brain focus and the disease.
- 2nd law (two-phased nature of disease): A patient who has not solved their conflict is in the first, active conflict phase, where the sympathetic nervous system predominates and which manifests as a "cold disease" accompanied by cold skin and extremities, stress, weight loss and sleep disorders. If they manage to resolve the conflict, they enter a second, post-resolution healing phase, in which the parasympathetic nervous system predominates, commonly diagnosed as a separate "warm" (rheumatic, infectious, allergic, etc.) disease. This second phase is the one that usually entails more risks, and a complete cure only comes upon its completion. In some circumstances, not solving the conflict but downgrading it to a reasonably livable level may be preferable to facing the second phase.
- 3rd law (ontogenetic system of diseases): Hamer proposes that disease progression is primarily controlled by the brain, either by the "old brain" (brainstem and cerebellum) or the "new brain" (cerebrum). The old brain controls more primitive processes, having to do with basic survival, such as breathing, eating, and reproduction, whereas the new brain manages more advanced personal and social issues, such as territorial conflicts, separation conflicts, and self-devaluation and identity conflicts. Hamer's research is tied to the science of embryology because he links the type of disease progression—whether involving tissue augmentation (tumor growth), tissue loss (necrosis or ulceration), or functional impairment—with the embryonic germ layer (endoderm, mesoderm or ectoderm) from which both the organ tissues and the corresponding brain regions originate. Conflicts which have their focus either in the brain stem (which controls body tissues that derive from the endoderm) or the cerebellum (which controls tissues that derive from the mesoderm) show cell multiplication in the conflict active phase, and destruction of the resulting tumors in the healing phase. Cerebrum directed conflicts (affecting the rest of mesoderm-derived tissues and all ectoderm-derived ones) show either cell decrease (necroses, ulcers) or function impairment or interruption in the active phase, and the replenishment of the damaged tissues in the healing phase (which can also be diagnosed as a tumor).
- 4th law (ontogenetic system of microbes): Microbes do not cause diseases but are used by the body, coordinated by the brain, to optimize the healing phase, provided that the required microbes are available when needed. Fungi and mycobacteria work on tissues that originated in the endoderm, as well as on some of the tissues originating in the mesoderm. Bacteria work on all mesoderm-derived tissues and viruses on ectoderm-derived ones. Hamer maintains that these microbes, rather than being antagonistic to the body, actually perform a necessary role in healing, and that some of the interventions of conventional medicine are counterproductive, by interfering with these natural processes.
- 5th law ("quintessence"): The conflict active phase and the healing phase of diseases, as described above, constitute "special meaningful programs of nature," developed during the evolution of the species, to allow organisms to override everyday functioning in order to deal with particular emergency situations.

Therefore, according to Hamer, no real diseases exist; rather, what established medicine calls a "disease" is actually a "special meaningful program of nature" (sinnvolles biologisches Sonderprogramm) to which bacteria, viruses and fungi belong. Hamer's GNM claims to explain every disease and treatment according to those premises, and to thereby obviate traditional medicine. The cure is always the resolving of the conflict. Some treatments like chemotherapy or pain relieving drugs like morphine are deadly according to Hamer. These "laws" are dogmas of GNM, not laws of nature or medicine, and are at odds with scientific understanding of human physiology.

== Olivia Pilhar case ==
In 1995, Hamer was associated with the case of Olivia Pilhar, a six-year-old Austrian girl who suffered from a Wilms' tumor. Pilhar's parents were members of Fiat Lux, a new religious movement whose leader, Uriella, referred them to Hamer. He diagnosed the girl as having several "conflicts" rather than cancer. When the parents refused conventional medical therapy for Pilhar, the Austrian government removed their rights of care and control. The parents fled with their daughter to Spain, which was Hamer's place of residence at the time. After negotiations, including the intervention of the Austrian President Thomas Klestil, the parents were persuaded to return to Austria. By then, Pilhar's health had deteriorated. The tumor had grown very large, weighing four kilograms, filling most of her abdominal cavity and was pressing against her lungs. The lack of treatment had reduced the estimate of survival probability from 90% to 10%. After a court ordered conventional cancer treatment with surgery, chemotherapy and radiation therapy, Pilhar recovered completely and was still alive in 2010. Her parents received an eight-month suspended jail sentence in Austria.

== Jewish conspiracy theory ==
Hamer purported that his method is a "Germanic" alternative to mainstream clinical medicine, which he claimed is part of a Jewish conspiracy to decimate non-Jews. In this, Hamer repeated the antisemitic claims of Nazi physician Gerhard Wagner. More precisely, Hamer asserted that chemotherapy and morphine are used to "mass murder" Western civilization, while falsely alleging that such treatments are not used in Israel. Hamer promoted the idea that most German oncologists are Jewish and that "no Jew is treated with chemotherapy in Germany." According to him, hypodermic needles are used during chemotherapy to implant "chips" containing "chambers of poison" that can be activated by satellite to specifically kill patients. He proposed that the swine flu vaccination campaign of 2009 was also used to mark people with those "chips" and denied the existence of HIV. Hamer also believed that the denial of recognition of his theories and the revocation of his practitioner's licence were due to a Jewish conspiracy.

In 2008, Hamer presented a document where a supposed rabbi, "Esra" Iwan Götz, confirmed the existence of a conspiracy among Jewish oncologists to use the "torture" of chemotherapy on all non-Jewish patients, while Jewish patients were to receive the "correct" treatment of GNM. Götz, a German holocaust denier active in the German Reich revivalism scene, has been repeatedly convicted by German courts for fraud, defamation, misuse of academic titles (the title "Chief Rabbi" is not legally protected in Germany), and the falsification of documents, among others.

== Response by medical authorities ==
The Swiss Cancer League of the Swiss Society for Oncology, Swiss Society for Medical Oncology, and Swiss Institute for Applied Cancer Research say that no case of a cancer cure by Hamer has been published in the medical literature, nor any studies in specialised journals. Reports in his books "lack the additional data that are essential for medical assessment" and the presentations of his investigations, at medical conferences are "scientifically unconvincing". Additionally, scientific organisation, such as the German Cancer Research Center, the German Cancer Society, the German Medical Association, and the German Consumer Councils, strongly disagree with Hamer. Proponents of alternative cancer treatments also regard Hamer's theory skeptically and argue for supportive evidence and proven patient cases.

The Hamer foci that Hamer saw in the brain CTs are identified by radiologists as common ring artifacts. The medical establishment in Germany and the European Union warns of the threat posed to patients by Hamer's therapies. If effective treatment is neglected, the applying of Hamer's theories is punishable in some countries as malpractice. There are ongoing press reports of victims of Hamer's practice throughout Europe. (Note: Sources for 'victims')

== Publications ==
- Ryke Geerd Hamer (1998). Vermächtnis einer Neuen Medizin. Amici di Dirk. ISBN 978-3-926755-00-1.
- Ryke Geerd Hamer (2000). Summary of the New Medicine. Amici di Dirk. ISBN 84-930091-9-9.
- Ryke Geerd Hamer (2005). Einer gegen alle. Amici di Dirk. ISBN 84-96127-15-X.
- Ryke Geerd Hamer (2004). Krebs und alle sog. Krankheiten. Amici di Dirk. ISBN 84-96127-12-5.

== See also ==
- List of unproven and disproven cancer treatments
