= 2009 swine flu pandemic tables =

CDC statistics on swine flu

This page summarises the figures from the WHO Influenza A Situation Updates issued roughly once every other day, and since 6 July from ECDC. For each country or territory, the table lists the number of confirmed cases of swine flu on the first reported day each month, and the latest figure. The number of countries affected is shown, and the number of days it has taken for the number of cases to double. The table can be sorted by country, date of first confirmed case or date of first confirmed case by continent.

As no global reports have been issued by WHO since 6 July 2009, data since then is taken from the reports of ECDC. ECDC stopped reporting cases outside Europe in August, and only reported deaths from 30 September.

== Tables by month ==
The full figures for each month can be found in the following tables:

- 2009 flu pandemic table April 2009
- 2009 flu pandemic table May 2009
- 2009 flu pandemic table June 2009
- 2009 flu pandemic table July 2009
- 2009 flu pandemic table August 2009
- 2009 flu pandemic table September 2009
- 2009 flu pandemic table October 2009
- 2009 flu pandemic table November 2009
- 2009 flu pandemic table December 2009

== Confirmed cases ==
Swine flu cases to date
| By date | By cont. | Country or territory | First case | April | May | June | July | August | Latest (9 August) |
|---|---|---|---|---|---|---|---|---|---|
| 0 | 0 | World | 2009-04-24 | 25 | 367 | 17,398 | 77,201 | 188,333 | 208,269 |
| 0 | 0 | Days to double (approx) | | | 2 | 15 | 15 | 28 | 29 |
| 0 | 0 | Countries and territories | | 2 | 13 | 63 | 121 | 168 | 175 |
| 1 | 1.01 | Mexico | 2009-04-24 | 18 | 156 | 5,029 | 8,680 | 16,442 | 17,530 |
| 2 | 1.02 | United States of America | 2009-04-24 | 7 | 141 | 8,975 | 27,717 | 43,771 | 43,771 |
| 3 | 1.03 | Canada | 2009-04-27 | | 34 | 1,336 | 7,983 | 10,449 | 10,449 |
| 16 | 1.04 | Costa Rica | 2009-05-02 | | | 37 | 279 | 668 | 798 |
| 19 | 1.05 | El Salvador | 2009-05-04 | | | 27 | 226 | 556 | 595 |
| 22 | 1.06 | Guatemala | 2009-05-06 | | | 12 | 254 | 558 | 558 |
| 27 | 1.07 | Panama | 2009-05-09 | | | 107 | 417 | 588 | 600 |
| 33 | 1.08 | Cuba | 2009-05-13 | | | 4 | 46 | 234 | 264 |
| 46 | 1.09 | Honduras | 2009-05-25 | | | 2 | 118 | 169 | 254 |
| 52 | 1.1 | Dominican Republic | 2009-05-29 | | | 2 | 108 | 154 | 182 |
| 59 | 1.11 | Bahamas | 2009-06-01 | | | 1 | 6 | 29 | 29 |
| 57 | 1.12 | Jamaica | 2009-06-01 | | | 2 | 32 | 62 | 64 |
| 67 | 1.13 | Nicaragua | 2009-06-03 | | | | 293 | 432 | 510 |
| 68 | 1.14 | Barbados | 2009-06-05 | | | | 10 | 23 | 39 |
| 72 | 1.15 | Cayman Islands | 2009-06-08 | | | | 13 | 60 | 88 |
| 73 | 1.16 | Dominica | 2009-06-08 | | | | 1 | 1 | 1 |
| 71 | 1.17 | Trinidad and Tobago | 2009-06-08 | | | | 53 | 97 | 106 |
| 80 | 1.18 | Bermuda | 2009-06-17 | | | | 1 | 4 | 8 |
| 81 | 1.19 | British Virgin Islands | 2009-06-17 | | | | 1 | 5 | 8 |
| 83 | 1.2 | Martinique | 2009-06-17 | | | | 2 | 3 | 3 |
| 84 | 1.21 | Netherlands Antilles | 2009-06-17 | | | | 14 | 19 | 19 |
| 101 | 1.22 | Antigua and Barbuda | 2009-06-24 | | | | 2 | 3 | 4 |
| 119 | 1.23 | Saint Lucia | 2009-07-01 | | | | 1 | 3 | 6 |
| 122 | 1.24 | Aruba | 2009-06-03 | | | | | 13 | 13 |
| 127 | 1.25 | Puerto Rico | 2009-07-06 | | | | | 18 | 18 |
| 128 | 1.26 | Guadeloupe | 2009-07-06 | | | | | 2 | 2 |
| 131 | 1.27 | Saint Martin | 2009-07-06 | | | | | 1 | 1 |
| 132 | 1.28 | (United States Virgin Islands) US Virgin Islands | 2009-07-06 | | | | | 1 | 1 |
| 143 | 1.29 | Saint Vincent and the Grenadines | 2009-07-10 | | | | | 1 | 1 |
| 147 | 1.30 | Belize | 2009-07-16 | | | | | 23 | 27 |
| 148 | 1.31 | Haiti | 2009-07-16 | | | | | 3 | 5 |
| 149 | 1.32 | Saint Kitts and Nevis | 2009-07-16 | | | | | 3 | 4 |
| 160 | 1.33 | Grenada | 2009-06-29 | | | | | 1 | 2 |
| 167 | 1.34 | Turks and Caicos Islands | 2009-08-03 | | | | | 12 | 12 |
| 170 | 1.35 | Anguilla | 2009-08-05 | | | | | | 1 |
| 4 | 2.01 | Spain | 2009-04-27 | | 13 | 178 | 717 | 1,538 | 1,538 |
| 7 | 2.02 | United Kingdom | 2009-04-28 | | 8 | 229 | 6,538 | 11,912 | 12,470 |
| 9 | 2.03 | Austria | 2009-04-29 | | 1 | 1 | 15 | 153 | 192 |
| 8 | 2.04 | Germany | 2009-04-29 | | 4 | 28 | 417 | 6,800 | 9,213 |
| 10 | 2.05 | Netherlands | 2009-04-30 | | 1 | 3 | 128 | 517 | 912 |
| 11 | 2.06 | Switzerland | 2009-04-30 | | 1 | 8 | 56 | 484 | 609 |
| 13 | 2.07 | Denmark | 2009-05-01 | | 1 | 1 | 55 | 254 | 354 |
| 14 | 2.08 | France | 2009-05-02 | | | 24 | 277 | 719 | 880 |
| 17 | 2.09 | Ireland | 2009-04-30 | | | 4 | 41 | 276 | 475 |
| 18 | 2.1 | Italy | 2009-05-03 | | | 29 | 123 | 975 | 1,238 |
| 21 | 2.11 | Portugal | 2009-05-04 | | | 1 | 17 | 866 | 546 |
| 23 | 2.12 | Sweden | 2009-05-06 | | | 4 | 69 | 526 | 574 |
| 24 | 2.13 | Poland | 2009-05-07 | | | 4 | 15 | 93 | 114 |
| 30 | 2.14 | Norway | 2009-05-11 | | | 4 | 32 | 471 | 738 |
| 31 | 2.15 | Finland | 2009-05-13 | | | 3 | 26 | 189 | 189 |
| 34 | 2.16 | Belgium | 2009-05-15 | | | 12 | 707 | 1,586 | 1,586 |
| 41 | 2.17 | Greece | 2009-05-20 | | | 4 | 92 | 730 | 1,002 |
| 43 | 2.18 | Russia | 2009-05-23 | | | 3 | 3 | 41 | 55 |
| 47 | 2.19 | Iceland | 2009-05-25 | | | 1 | 4 | 51 | 72 |
| 50 | 2.2 | Romania | 2009-05-29 | | | 3 | 28 | 178 | 216 |
| 53 | 2.21 | Czech Republic | 2009-05-29 | | | 1 | 9 | 116 | 162 |
| 54 | 2.22 | Slovakia | 2009-05-29 | | | 2 | 13 | 58 | 78 |
| 60 | 2.23 | Cyprus | 2009-06-01 | | | 1 | 48 | 297 | 297 |
| 61 | 2.24 | Estonia | 2009-06-01 | | | 1 | 13 | 42 | 50 |
| 62 | 2.25 | Hungary | 2009-06-01 | | | 1 | 10 | 99 | 115 |
| 65 | 2.26 | Bulgaria | 2009-06-03 | | | | 67 | 36 | 40 |
| 69 | 2.27 | Luxembourg | 2009-06-05 | | | | 4 | 61 | 87 |
| 75 | 2.28 | Ukraine | 2009-06-10 | | | | 1 | 1 | 1 |
| 87 | 2.29 | Isle of Man | 2009-06-17 | | | | 1 | 11 | 11 |
| 88 | 2.3 | Jersey | 2009-06-17 | | | | 8 | 37 | 55 |
| 95 | 2.31 | Slovenia | 2009-06-22 | | | | 4 | 136 | 174 |
| 105 | 2.32 | Latvia | 2009-06-24 | | | | 1 | 19 | 19 |
| 106 | 2.33 | Montenegro | 2009-06-24 | | | | 4 | 18 | 18 |
| 109 | 2.34 | Serbia | 2009-06-26 | | | | 12 | 115 | 120 |
| 111 | 2.35 | Guernsey | 2009-06-26 | | | | 5 | 18 | 18 |
| 115 | 2.36 | Lithuania | 2009-06-29 | | | | 1 | 22 | 29 |
| 116 | 2.37 | Monaco | 2009-06-29 | | | | | 1 | 1 |
| 123 | 2.38 | Malta | 2009-06-03 | | | | | 157 | 176 |
| 124 | 2.39 | Bosnia and Herzegovina | 2009-06-03 | | | | | 2 | 10 |
| 129 | 2.40 | Macedonia | 2009-07-06 | | | | | 21 | 29 |
| 133 | 2.41 | Croatia | 2009-07-06 | | | | | 55 | 69 |
| 152 | 2.42 | Georgia | 2009-07-20 | | | | | 6 | 13 |
| 154 | 2.43 | Albania | 2009-07-22 | | | | | 3 | 13 |
| 161 | 2.44 | Andorra | 2009-06-29 | | | | | 1 | 1 |
| 162 | 2.45 | Kosovo | 2009-06-29 | | | | | 1 | 2 |
| 163 | 2.46 | Azerbaijan | 2009-07-31 | | | | | 2 | 2 |
| 164 | 2.47 | Moldova | 2009-07-31 | | | | | 1 | 2 |
| 166 | 2.48 | (United Kingdom) Cyprus UK bases | 2009-08-03 | | | | | 30 | 30 |
| 173 | 2.49 | Liechtenstein | 2009-08-09 | | | | | | 5 |
| 6 | 3.01 | Israel | 2009-04-28 | | 2 | 19 | 506 | 1,719 | 2,000 |
| 12 | 3.02 | China | 2009-05-01 | | 1 | 52 | 1518 | 6628 | 7931 |
| 15 | 3.03 | Korea, Republic of | 2009-05-02 | | | 33 | 202 | 1,466 | 1,754 |
| 26 | 3.04 | Japan | 2009-05-09 | | | 370 | 1,266 | 5,022 | 5,022 |
| 32 | 3.05 | Thailand | 2009-05-13 | | | 2 | 1,414 | 8,879 | 10,043 |
| 38 | 3.06 | India | 2009-05-17 | | | 1 | 104 | 551 | 615 |
| 37 | 3.07 | Malaysia | 2009-05-17 | | | 2 | 112 | 1,446 | 1,780 |
| 39 | 3.08 | Turkey | 2009-05-17 | | | 4 | 32 | 199 | 199 |
| 42 | 3.09 | Philippines | 2009-05-22 | | | 16 | 861 | 3,207 | 3,207 |
| 44 | 3.1 | Taiwan | 2009-05-23 | | | 12 | 61 | 1,280 | 1,280 |
| 45 | 3.11 | Kuwait | 2009-05-25 | | | 18 | 34 | 203 | 498 |
| 48 | 3.12 | Bahrain | 2009-05-27 | | | 1 | 15 | 123 | 148 |
| 49 | 3.13 | Singapore | 2009-05-27 | | | 5 | 701 | 1,217 | 1,217 |
| 63 | 3.14 | Viet Nam | 2009-06-01 | | | 1 | 123 | 971 | 1,115 |
| 66 | 3.15 | Lebanon | 2009-06-03 | | | | 39 | 210 | 210 |
| 70 | 3.16 | Saudi Arabia | 2009-06-05 | | | | 81 | 595 | 595 |
| 74 | 3.17 | United Arab Emirates | 2009-06-08 | | | | 8 | 110 | 125 |
| 76 | 3.18 | (Palestinian Authority) West Bank and Gaza Strip | 2009-06-15 | | | | 13 | 104 | 181 |
| 78 | 3.19 | Qatar | 2009-06-17 | | | | 10 | 43 | 43 |
| 79 | 3.2 | Jordan | 2009-06-17 | | | | 20 | 79 | 99 |
| 86 | 3.21 | Sri Lanka | 2009-06-17 | | | | 15 | 55 | 60 |
| 89 | 3.22 | Yemen | 2009-06-17 | | | | 7 | 11 | 13 |
| 91 | 3.23 | Oman | 2009-06-19 | | | | 3 | 123 | 125 |
| 92 | 3.24 | Laos | 2009-06-19 | | | | 3 | 51 | 156 |
| 93 | 3.25 | Papua New Guinea | 2009-06-19 | | | | 1 | 1 | 5 |
| 96 | 3.26 | Bangladesh | 2009-06-22 | | | | 1 | 30 | 32 |
| 97 | 3.27 | Brunei | 2009-06-22 | | | | 29 | 786 | 850 |
| 107 | 3.28 | Cambodia | 2009-06-24 | | | | 6 | 17 | 24 |
| 110 | 3.29 | Indonesia | 2009-06-26 | | | | 8 | 561 | 691 |
| 112 | 3.3 | Iran | 2009-06-26 | | | | 1 | 105 | 144 |
| 113 | 3.31 | Iraq | 2009-06-29 | | | | 1 | 58 | 67 |
| 114 | 3.32 | Nepal | 2009-06-29 | | | | 11 | 17 | 17 |
| 120 | 3.33 | Myanmar | 2009-07-01 | | | | 1 | 10 | 15 |
| 134 | 3.34 | Syria | 2009-07-06 | | | | | 5 | 16 |
| 137 | 3.35 | Afghanistan | 2009-07-08 | | | | | 32 | 32 |
| 156 | 3.36 | Bhutan | 2009-06-27 | | | | | 2 | 3 |
| 157 | 3.37 | Maldives | 2009-06-27 | | | | | 1 | 1 |
| 158 | 3.38 | Kazakhstan | 2009-06-29 | | | | | 14 | 17 |
| 168 | 3.39 | Pakistan | 2009-08-03 | | | | | 1 | 1 |
| 5 | 4.01 | New Zealand | 2009-04-28 | | 4 | 9 | 711 | 2,855 | 2,935 |
| 29 | 4.02 | Australia | 2009-05-09 | | | 297 | 4,090 | 22,109 | 24,949 |
| 82 | 4.03 | French Polynesia | 2009-06-17 | | | | 2 | 16 | 16 |
| 85 | 4.04 | Samoa | 2009-06-17 | | | | 1 | 37 | 100 |
| 98 | 4.05 | Fiji | 2009-06-22 | | | | 2 | 97 | 97 |
| 108 | 4.06 | Vanuatu | 2009-06-24 | | | | 2 | 3 | 3 |
| 118 | 4.07 | New Caledonia | 2009-07-01 | | | | 6 | 112 | 112 |
| 125 | 4.08 | Palau | 2009-06-03 | | | | | 1 | 13 |
| 135 | 4.09 | Cook Islands | 2009-07-06 | | | | | 1 | 18 |
| 142 | 4.10 | Guam | 2009-07-10 | | | | | 1 | 1 |
| 144 | 4.11 | Tonga | 2009-07-15 | | | | | 9 | 9 |
| 153 | 4.12 | Solomon Islands | 2009-07-22 | | | | | 2 | 3 |
| 155 | 4.13 | Federated States of Micronesia | 2009-07-22 | | | | | 1 | 1 |
| 171 | 4.14 | Marshall Islands | 2009-08-09 | | | | | | 27 |
| 172 | 4.15 | Nauru | 2009-08-09 | | | | | | 7 |
| 174 | 4.16 | Kiribati | 2009-08-09 | | | | | | 3 |
| 20 | 5.01 | Colombia | 2009-05-04 | | | 20 | 93 | 270 | 275 |
| 25 | 5.02 | Brazil | 2009-05-08 | | | 20 | 680 | 1,958 | 2,959 |
| 28 | 5.03 | Argentina | 2009-05-09 | | | 100 | 1,587 | 3,056 | 5,710 |
| 35 | 5.04 | Ecuador | 2009-05-16 | | | 39 | 163 | 696 | 881 |
| 36 | 5.05 | Peru | 2009-05-16 | | | 36 | 538 | 4,104 | 5,304 |
| 40 | 5.06 | Chile | 2009-05-18 | | | 250 | 6,211 | 11,860 | 12,030 |
| 51 | 5.07 | Uruguay | 2009-05-29 | | | 11 | 195 | 550 | 550 |
| 55 | 5.08 | Paraguay | 2009-06-01 | | | 5 | 205 | 223 | 244 |
| 56 | 5.09 | Bolivia | 2009-06-01 | | | 3 | 96 | 946 | 973 |
| 58 | 5.1 | Venezuela | 2009-06-01 | | | 2 | 193 | 454 | 476 |
| 90 | 5.11 | Suriname | 2009-06-19 | | | | 11 | 14 | 18 |
| 130 | 5.12 | Guyana | 2009-07-06 | | | | | 5 | 8 |
| 146 | 5.13 | French Guiana | 2009-07-13 | | | | | 9 | 9 |
| 169 | 5.14 | Falkland Islands | 2009-08-05 | | | | | | 5 |
| 66 | 6.01 | Egypt | 2009-06-03 | | | | 39 | 283 | 314 |
| 77 | 6.02 | Morocco | 2009-06-15 | | | | 17 | 66 | 75 |
| 94 | 6.03 | South Africa | 2009-06-19 | | | | 1 | 480 | 700 |
| 99 | 6.04 | Algeria | 2009-06-22 | | | | 2 | 16 | 19 |
| 100 | 6.05 | Cape Verde | 2009-06-24 | | | | 3 | 6 | 6 |
| 102 | 6.06 | Cote d'Ivoire | 2009-06-24 | | | | 2 | 2 | 2 |
| 103 | 6.07 | Tunisia | 2009-06-24 | | | | 3 | 10 | 19 |
| 104 | 6.08 | Ethiopia | 2009-06-24 | | | | 2 | 4 | 4 |
| 117 | 6.09 | Mauritius | 2009-07-01 | | | | 7 | 2 | 6 |
| 121 | 6.1 | Kenya | 2009-07-01 | | | | 1 | 26 | 26 |
| 126 | 6.11 | Uganda | 2009-06-03 | | | | | 9 | 9 |
| 136 | 6.12 | Libya | 2009-07-06 | | | | | 9 | 9 |
| 138 | 6.13 | Réunion | 2009-07-08 | | | | | 26 | 26 |
| 139 | 6.14 | Seychelles | 2009-07-08 | | | | | 3 | 3 |
| 140 | 6.15 | Tanzania | 2009-07-09 | | | | | 8 | 10 |
| 145 | 6.16 | Botswana | 2009-07-13 | | | | | 13 | 23 |
| 150 | 6.17 | Sudan | 2009-07-17 | | | | | 2 | 2 |
| 151 | 6.18 | Namibia | 2009-07-20 | | | | | 4 | 7 |
| 159 | 6.19 | Swaziland | 2009-06-29 | | | | | 2 | 2 |
| 165 | 6.20 | Gabon | 2009-07-31 | | | | | 1 | 1 |
| 175 | 6.21 | Ghana | 2009-08-09 | | | | | | 2 |

== Deaths ==
Swine flu deaths
| By date | By cont. | Country | First death | Apr | May | Jun | Jul | Aug | Sep | Oct | Nov | Dec |
|---|---|---|---|---|---|---|---|---|---|---|---|---|
| 0 | 0 | World | 2009-04-27 | | 10 | 115 | 332 | 1,265 | 3,097 | 4,433 | 6,153 | 8,748 |
| 0 | 0 | Countries | | 0 | 2 | 4 | 17 | 45 | 69 | 83 | 99 | 124 |
| 1 | 1.01 | Mexico | 2009-04-27 | | 9 | 97 | 116 | 146 | 193 | 231 | 354 | 656 |
| 2 | 1.02 | USA | 2009-04-30 | | 1 | 15 | 127 | 353 | 556 | 593 | 1,004 | 1,265 |
| 3 | 1.03 | Canada | 2009-05-09 | | | 2 | 25 | 59 | 72 | 78 | 95 | 309 |
| 4 | 1.04 | Costa Rica | 2009-05-10 | | | 1 | 2 | 22 | 33 | 37 | 38 | 40 |
| 6 | 1.05 | Dominican Republic | 2009-06-08 | | | | 2 | 5 | 8 | 21 | 22 | 22 |
| 8 | 1.06 | Guatemala | 2009-06-12 | | | | 2 | 10 | 12 | 13 | 18 | 18 |
| 13 | 1.07 | Honduras | 2009-06-26 | | | | 1 | 4 | 8 | 15 | 16 | 16 |
| 21 | 1.08 | El Salvador | 2009-07-08 | | | | | 9 | 17 | 19 | 22 | 27 |
| 22 | 1.09 | Jamaica | 2009-07-08 | | | | | 3 | 4 | 4 | 5 | 6 |
| 30 | 1.10 | Panama | 2009-07-22 | | | | | 2 | 7 | 11 | 11 | 11 |
| 37 | 1.11 | Cayman Islands | 2009-07-29 | | | | | 1 | 1 | 1 | 1 | 1 |
| 38 | 1.12 | Saint Kitts and Nevis | 2009-07-29 | | | | | 1 | 1 | 1 | 1 | 1 |
| 55 | 1.13 | Nicaragua | 2009-08-14 | | | | | | 4 | 11 | 11 | 11 |
| 81 | 1.14 | Barbados | 2009-10-02 | | | | | | | 1 | 3 | 3 |
| 84 | 1.15 | Cuba | 2009-10-05 | | | | | | | | 7 | 7 |
| 86 | 1.16 | Bahamas | 2009-10-16 | | | | | | | | 4 | 4 |
| 87 | 1.17 | Trinidad and Tobago | 2009-10-16 | | | | | | | | 5 | 5 |
| 104 | 1.18 | Saint Lucia | 2009-11-11 | | | | | | | | | 1 |
| 5 | 2.01 | Chile | 2009-06-05 | | | | 12 | 87 | 130 | 132 | 136 | 148 |
| 7 | 2.02 | Colombia | 2009-06-11 | | | | 2 | 17 | 35 | 91 | 131 | 160 |
| 9 | 2.03 | Argentina | 2009-06-15 | | | | 26 | 165 | 465 | 538 | 593 | 613 |
| 15 | 2.04 | Brazil | 2009-07-01 | | | | 1 | 56 | 557 | 899 | 1,368 | 1,528 |
| 16 | 2.05 | Uruguay | 2009-07-01 | | | | 1 | 22 | 32 | 33 | 33 | 33 |
| 19 | 2.06 | Paraguay | 2009-07-06 | | | | | 19 | 41 | 52 | 52 | 52 |
| 20 | 2.07 | Peru | 2009-07-08 | | | | | 30 | 98 | 143 | 162 | 190 |
| 24 | 2.08 | Ecuador | 2009-07-10 | | | | | 18 | 40 | 60 | 75 | 82 |
| 25 | 2.09 | Bolivia | 2009-07-19 | | | | | 9 | 19 | 54 | 56 | 58 |
| 27 | 2.10 | Venezuela | 2009-07-20 | | | | | 2 | 24 | 83 | 95 | 114 |
| 73 | 2.11 | Suriname | 2009-09-09 | | | | | | | 2 | 2 | 2 |
| 10 | 3.01 | United Kingdom | 2009-06-17 | | | | 3 | 30 | 65 | 82 | 137 | 250 |
| 17 | 3.02 | Spain | 2009-07-01 | | | | 1 | 7 | 21 | 42 | 63 | 135 |
| 33 | 3.03 | Hungary | 2009-07-24 | | | | | 1 | 1 | 2 | 4 | 8 |
| 40 | 3.04 | Belgium | 2009-07-31 | | | | | 1 | 1 | 2 | 7 | 13 |
| 43 | 3.05 | France | 2009-07-31 | | | | | 1 | 10 | 30 | 44 | 114 |
| 47 | 3.06 | Netherlands | 2009-08-05 | | | | | | 2 | 4 | 10 | 36 |
| 50 | 3.07 | Ireland | 2009-08-09 | | | | | | 2 | 2 | 10 | 17 |
| 50 | 3.08 | Malta | 2009-08-19 | | | | | | 1 | 3 | 5 | 3 |
| 64 | 3.09 | Greece | 2009-08-24 | | | | | | 1 | 3 | 3 | 12 |
| 69 | 3.10 | Sweden | 2009-09-02 | | | | | | 1 | 2 | 2 | 15 |
| 70 | 3.11 | Italy | 2009-09-04 | | | | | | | 3 | 4 | 95 |
| 71 | 3.12 | Norway | 2009-09-04 | | | | | | | 11 | 13 | 25 |
| 77 | 3.13 | Luxembourg | 2009-09-18 | | | | | | | 1 | 1 | 1 |
| 78 | 3.14 | Portugal | 2009-09-25 | | | | | | | 2 | 4 | 21 |
| 82 | 3.15 | Bulgaria | 2009-10-02 | | | | | | | 1 | 2 | 5 |
| 83 | 3.16 | Germany | 2009-10-02 | | | | | | | 1 | 5 | 60 |
| 89 | 3.17 | Iceland | 2009-10-21 | | | | | | | | 1 | 2 |
| 91 | 3.18 | Serbia | 2009-11-05 | | | | | | | | 3 | 22 |
| 93 | 3.19 | Moldova | 2009-10-26 | | | | | | | | 1 | 12 |
| 94 | 3.20 | Turkey | 2009-10-26 | | | | | | | | 3 | 195 |
| 96 | 3.21 | Russia | 2009-10-28 | | | | | | | | 5 | 19 |
| 97 | 3.22 | Czech Republic | 2009-10-28 | | | | | | | | 1 | 8 |
| 98 | 3.23 | Finland | 2009-10-28 | | | | | | | | 1 | 16 |
| 100 | 3.24 | Austria | 2009-11-04 | | | | | | | | | 3 |
| 101 | 3.25 | Croatia | 2009-11-04 | | | | | | | | | 11 |
| 102 | 3.26 | Belarus | 2009-11-06 | | | | | | | | | 20 |
| 103 | 3.27 | Ukraine | 2009-11-06 | | | | | | | | | 41 |
| 105 | 3.28 | Latvia | 2009-11-11 | | | | | | | | | 8 |
| 106 | 3.29 | Slovakia | 2009-11-11 | | | | | | | | | 1 |
| 108 | 3.30 | Azerbaijan | 2009-11-13 | | | | | | | | | 2 |
| 109 | 3.31 | Kosovo | 2009-11-15 | | | | | | | | | 7 |
| 110 | 3.32 | Poland | 2009-11-15 | | | | | | | | | 24 |
| 114 | 3.33 | Bosnia and Herzegovina | 2009-11-20 | | | | | | | | | 1 |
| 115 | 3.33 | Macedonia | 2009-11-20 | | | | | | | | | 4 |
| 116 | 3.34 | Lithuania | 2009-11-20 | | | | | | | | | 5 |
| 117 | 3.35 | Switzerland | 2009-11-20 | | | | | | | | | 3 |
| 118 | 3.36 | Denmark | 2009-11-23 | | | | | | | | | 6 |
| 120 | 3.37 | Romania | 2009-11-25 | | | | | | | | | 3 |
| 121 | 3.38 | Slovenia | 2009-11-25 | | | | | | | | | 7 |
| 122 | 3.39 | Estonia | 2009-11-27 | | | | | | | | | 1 |
| 11 | 4.01 | Australia | 2009-06-19 | | | | 7 | 67 | 155 | 180 | 186 | 190 |
| 18 | 4.02 | New Zealand | 2009-07-06 | | | | | 14 | 17 | 18 | 19 | 20 |
| 31 | 4.03 | Tonga | 2009-07-22 | | | | | 1 | 1 | 1 | 1 | 1 |
| 49 | 4.04 | Samoa | 2009-08-09 | | | | | | 2 | 2 | 2 | 2 |
| 59 | 4.05 | Cook Islands | 2009-08-19 | | | | | | 1 | 1 | 1 | 1 |
| 67 | 4.06 | Marshall Islands | 2009-09-02 | | | | | | 1 | 1 | 1 | 1 |
| 79 | 4.07 | Solomon Islands | 2009-09-30 | | | | | | | 1 | 1 | 1 |
| 12 | 5.01 | Philippines | 2009-06-24 | | | | 1 | 8 | 8 | 28 | 30 | 30 |
| 14 | 5.02 | Thailand | 2009-07-01 | | | | 3 | 65 | 130 | 165 | 182 | 187 |
| 23 | 5.03 | Brunei | 2009-07-08 | | | | | 1 | 1 | 1 | 1 | 1 |
| 26 | 5.04 | China | 2009-07-16 | | | | | 3 | 9 | 23 | 43 | 147 |
| 28 | 5.05 | Singapore | 2009-07-20 | | | | | 6 | 16 | 18 | 18 | 19 |
| 32 | 5.06 | Laos | 2009-07-22 | | | | | 1 | 1 | 1 | 1 | 1 |
| 34 | 5.07 | Indonesia | 2009-07-27 | | | | | 1 | 8 | 10 | 10 | 10 |
| 35 | 5.08 | Malaysia | 2009-07-29 | | | | | 7 | 72 | 77 | 77 | 77 |
| 36 | 5.09 | Saudi Arabia | 2009-07-29 | | | | | 4 | 19 | 30 | 62 | 81 |
| 39 | 5.10 | Israel | 2009-07-29 | | | | | 2 | 16 | 28 | 35 | 63 |
| 42 | 5.11 | Taiwan | 2009-07-31 | | | | | 1 | 5 | 19 | 27 | 30 |
| 44 | 5.12 | Qatar | 2009-08-03 | | | | | 1 | 1 | 3 | 4 | 8 |
| 45 | 5.13 | Lebanon | 2009-07-30 | | | | | 1 | 1 | 2 | 3 | 3 |
| 47 | 5.14 | India | 2009-08-04 | | | | | | 101 | 315 | 472 | 575 |
| 48 | 5.15 | Vietnam | 2009-08-05 | | | | | | 2 | 16 | 36 | 44 |
| 51 | 5.16 | Iraq | 2009-08-09 | | | | | | 1 | 1 | 4 | 15 |
| 52 | 5.17 | Mauritius | 2009-08-09 | | | | | | 7 | 8 | 8 | 8 |
| 53 | 5.18 | (Palestine) West Bank and Gaza Strip | 2009-08-09 | | | | | | 1 | 1 | 1 | 9 |
| 56 | 5.19 | South Korea | 2009-08-17 | | | | | | 4 | 11 | 34 | 104 |
| 57 | 5.20 | Japan | 2009-08-17 | | | | | 8 | 9 | 18 | 27 | 28 |
| 60 | 5.21 | Yemen | 2009-08-19 | | | | | | 1 | 6 | 16 | 22 |
| 61 | 5.22 | Kuwait | 2009-08-21 | | | | | | 5 | 8 | 16 | 27 |
| 62 | 5.23 | United Arab Emirates | 2009-08-21 | | | | | | 2 | 6 | 6 | 6 |
| 63 | 5.24 | Oman | 2009-08-24 | | | | | | 10 | 21 | 24 | 27 |
| 65 | 5.25 | Iran | 2009-09-02 | | | | | | 2 | 4 | 22 | 140 |
| 66 | 5.26 | Syria | 2009-09-02 | | | | | | 2 | 2 | 7 | 50 |
| 68 | 5.27 | Bahrain | 2009-09-02 | | | | | | 1 | 3 | 6 | 7 |
| 72 | 5.28 | Bangladesh | 2009-09-04 | | | | | | | 4 | 6 | 6 |
| 80 | 5.29 | Cambodia | 2009-09-30 | | | | | | | 1 | 4 | 5 |
| 85 | 5.30 | Jordan | 2009-10-14 | | | | | | | | 4 | 14 |
| 95 | 5.31 | Mongolia | 2009-10-26 | | | | | | | | 4 | 18 |
| 99 | 5.32 | Afghanistan | 2009-10-30 | | | | | | | | 1 | 16 |
| 107 | 5.33 | Sri Lanka | 2009-11-11 | | | | | | | | | 5 |
| 113 | 5.34 | Pakistan | 2009-11-18 | | | | | | | | | 1 |
| 119 | 5.35 | Maldives | 2009-11-23 | | | | | | | | | 1 |
| 29 | 6.01 | Egypt | 2009-07-20 | | | | | 1 | 1 | 2 | 4 | 21 |
| 44 | 6.02 | South Africa | 2009-08-03 | | | | | 1 | 27 | 84 | 91 | 92 |
| 54 | 6.03 | Ghana | 2009-08-09 | | | | | | 1 | 1 | 1 | 1 |
| 74 | 6.04 | Namibia | 2009-09-09 | | | | | | | 1 | 1 | 1 |
| 75 | 6.05 | Madagascar | 2009-09-11 | | | | | | | 1 | 1 | 1 |
| 76 | 6.06 | Mozambique | 2009-09-16 | | | | | | | 2 | 2 | 2 |
| 88 | 6.07 | Tanzania | 2009-10-16 | | | | | | | | 1 | 1 |
| 90 | 6.08 | Sudan | 2009-10-21 | | | | | | | | 1 | 1 |
| 92 | 6.09 | São Tomé and Príncipe | 2009-10-26 | | | | | | | | 2 | 2 |
| 111 | 6.10 | Tunisia | 2009-11-18 | | | | | | | | | 2 |
| 112 | 6.11 | Morocco | 2009-11-18 | | | | | | | | | 4 |
| 123 | 6.12 | Algeria | 2009-11-30 | | | | | | | | | 3 |
