= 2009 flu pandemic table July 2009 =

This is a table containing the figures from the WHO Influenza A Situation Updates issued in July 2009 roughly three times a week, and, since 15 July, figures from ECDC. The table can by sorted by country, date of first confirmed case or date of first confirmed case by continent.

This presentation of the data in this and other tables may show the progression, peaks, and, eventually, decline of the epidemic in each country and continent.

Note that no global report has been issued by WHO since 6 July - the data on 8 July was compiled from the reports of each of WHO's six regions, and since 15 July has been taken from ECDC.

Summary tables | Previous month | Next month

== Confirmed cases ==
Swine flu cases, July 2009
By date	By cont.	Country or territory	1	3	6	8	15	16	17	20	22	24	27	29	31
0	0	World	77201	89921	94512	101922	125993	128325	130727	141962	164541	159294	163859	175769	183590
0	0	Days to double (approx)	15	14	16	18	20	19	19	19	20	21	22	24	25
0	0	Countries	121	126	136	139	146	149	150	152	155	155	157	162	165
1	1.01	Mexico	8680	10262	10262	11271	12645	12645	12645	13646	14229	14861	15383	16019	16442
2	1.02	United States of America	27717	33902	33902	33902	37246	37246	37246	40617	40617	43771	43771	43771	43771
3	1.03	Canada	7983	7983	7983	9066	985	10156	10156	10156	10156	10156	10156	10449	10449
16	1.04	Costa Rica	279	227	277	277	428	428	428	428	560	560	606	606	668
19	1.05	El Salvador	226	253	319	319	404	404	404	404	453	500	500	545	556
22	1.06	Guatemala	254	254	286	286	339	339	339	374	395	395	395	458	558
27	1.07	Panama	417	417	417	457	507	507	507	524	524	541	541	553	571
33	1.08	Cuba	46	73	85	109	144	144	144	144	144	186	186	186	234
46	1.09	Honduras	118	123	123	123	123	123	123	123	123	169	169	169	169
52	1.1	Dominican Republic	108	108	108	108	108	108	108	108	108	108	108	131	131
59	1.11	Bahamas	6	6	7	10	21	21	23	23	23	23	23	29	29
57	1.12	Jamaica	32	32	32	33	39	39	44	44	44	53	53	53	53
67	1.13	Nicaragua	293	308	321	335	368	384	387	387	403	414	414	432	432
68	1.14	Barbados	10	12	12	17	20	22	22	23	23	23	23	23	23
72	1.15	Cayman Islands	13	14	14	14	14	22	22	22	22	22	22	43	43
73	1.16	Dominica	1	1	1	1	1	1	1	1	1	1	1	1	1
71	1.17	Trinidad and Tobago	53	53	65	65	65	65	65	65	65	97	97	97	97
80	1.18	Bermuda	1	1	1	1	2	4	4	4	4	4	4	4	4
81	1.19	British Virgin Islands	1	2	2	2	2	2	2	2	2	2	2	2	2
83	1.20	Martinique	2	2	3	3	3	3	3	3	3	3	3	3	3
84	1.21	Netherlands Antilles	14	15	15	17	19	19	19	19	19	19	19	19	19
101	1.22	Antigua and Barbuda	2	2	2	2	3	3	3	3	3	3	3	3	3
119	1.23	Saint Lucia	1	1	1	1	1	1	1	1	1	3	3	3	3
122	1.24	Aruba		5	5	13	13	13	13	13	13	13	13	13	13
127	1.25	Puerto Rico			18	18	18	18	18	18	18	18	18	18	18
128	1.26	Guadeloupe			2	2	2	2	2	2	2	2	2	2	2
131	1.27	Saint Martin			1	1	1	1	1	1	1	1	1	1	1
132	1.28	U.S. Virgin Islands			1	1	1	1	1	1	1	1	1	1	1
143	1.29	Saint Vincent and the Grenadines					1	1	1	1	1	1	1	1	1
147	1.30	Belize						15	15	15	15	15	15	15	23
148	1.31	Haiti						3	3	3	3	3	3	3	3
149	1.32	Saint Kitts and Nevis						1	1	1	1	1	1	3	3
160	1.33	Grenada												1	1
4	2.01	Spain	717	760	776	870	1099	1099	1222	1309	1486	1538	1538	1538	1538
7	2.02	United Kingdom	6538	7447	7447	7447	9718	9718	10649	10649	10649	11159	11159	11159	11864
9	2.03	Austria	15	15	19	19	35	48	51	57	73	97	97	131	153
8	2.04	Germany	417	470	505	548	763	834	834	1469	1818	2844	2844	4445	6062
10	2.05	Netherlands	128	134	135	143	131	164	147	179	192	273	273	364	517
11	2.06	Switzerland	56	72	76	104	178	184	205	220	272	349	349	397	462
13	2.07	Denmark	55	63	66	69	77	86	98	98	143	180	180	213	254
14	2.08	France	277	300	310	347	412	429	423	558	558	558	558	558	719
17	2.09	Ireland	41	51	74	84	144	146	148	153	172	205	205	276	276
18	2.1	Italy	123	130	146	174	224	224	258	258	258	618	618	618	975
21	2.11	Portugal	17	27	42	57	102	111	116	149	161	212	232	248	291
23	2.12	Sweden	69	74	84	100	200	238	274	322	326	390	390	453	511
24	2.13	Poland	15	19	25	27	35	35	35	38	42	49	58	71	87
30	2.14	Norway	32	41	41	47	8	105	120	133	145	245	294	399	471
31	2.15	Finland	26	43	47	67	111	125	133	155	159	167	176	176	189
34	2.16	Belgium	47	49	54	59	124	124	124	126	126	126	126	126	126
41	2.17	Greece	92	109	151	165	323	323	323	323	323	520	520	520	730
43	2.18	Russia	3	3	3	3	3	4	4	9	12	18	18	28	28
47	2.19	Iceland	4	4	4	4	7	7	7	11	15	23	34	46	51
50	2.2	Romania	28	36	41	47	56	56	59	61	71	103	114	125	164
53	2.21	Czech Republic	9	15	15	17	21	21	21	28	29	38	63	66	95
54	2.22	Slovakia	13	18	18	22	30	31	31	31	32	40	41	47	52
60	2.23	Cyprus	48	70	109	135	297	297	297	297	297	297	297	297	297
61	2.24	Estonia	13	13	13	13	17	19	22	22	23	30	35	39	40
62	2.25	Hungary	10	11	11	21	26	26	27	29	29	47	65	77	86
64	2.26	Bulgaria	10	10	10	14	17	17	17	19	24	29	33	35	36
69	2.27	Luxembourg	4	4	6	6	13	13	13	19	19	19	38	52	52
75	2.28	Ukraine	1	1	1	1	1	1	1	1	1	1	1	1	1
87	2.29	Isle of Man	1	1	1	1	5	7	7	7	13	11	11	11	11
88	2.30	Jersey	8	11	11	11	11	11	11	11	11	11	11	11	11
95	2.31	Slovenia	4	5	14	14	28	32	40	64	72	92	102	115	128
105	2.32	Latvia	1	1	1	1	6	6	9	10	12	12	14	18	19
106	2.33	Montenegro	4	9	10	10	10	10	10	10	10	10	10	18	18
109	2.34	Serbia	12	15	15	21	54	54	81	81	109	109	115	115	115
111	2.35	Guernsey	5	5	5	5	5	5	5	5	5	5	5	5	5
112	2.36	Lithuania	1	3	3	5	5	5	5	7	7	10	10	15	22
115	2.37	Monaco	0	0	0	0	1	1	1	1	1	1	1	1	1
123	2.38	Malta		2	24	39	84	84	92	105	111	123	123	123	157
124	2.39	Bosnia and Herzegovina		1	1	2	2	2	2	2	2	2	2	2	2
129	2.40	Macedonia			2	2	7	9	9	13	7	14	14	14	14
133	2.41	Croatia			1	3	3	3	3	26	26	44	47	50	52
152	2.42	Georgia								1	1	1	1	1	6
154	2.43	Albania									1	1	1	3	3
161	2.44	Andorra												1	1
162	2.45	Kosovo												1	1
163	2.46	Azerbaijan													2
164	2.47	Moldova													1
6	3.01	Israel	506	577	681	727	890	890	890	1004	1094	1094	1094	1520	1520
12	3.02	China	1518	1814	2040	2173	2838	3086	3086	5926	3767	4267	4712	5440	5944
15	3.03	Korea, Republic of	202	202	202	286	446	446	446	448	448	448	1166	1327	1399
26	3.04	Japan	1266	1446	1790	1878	3124	3441	3663	3663	4462	5022	5022	5022	5022
32	3.05	Thailand	1414	1414	2076	2428	4057	4057	4057	4057	5120	5120	6776	8879	8879
38	3.06	India	104	104	129	153	229	229	229	229	308	371	429	475	509
37	3.07	Malaysia	112	112	112	112	772	772	772	835	921	978	1124	1266	1371
39	3.08	Turkey	32	40	40	40	40	40	40	116	116	116	116	116	116
42	3.09	Philippines	861	1709	1709	1709	2668	2668	2668	2668	2668	2668	2668	2668	3207
44	3.1	Taiwan	61	61	61	61	72	72	93	93	1280	1280	1280	1280	1280
45	3.11	Kuwait	34	35	35	39	44	44	44	44	67	68	91	112	145
48	3.12	Bahrain	15	15	15	19	29	29	29	39	44	57	77	77	98
49	3.13	Singapore	701	878	1055	1111	1217	1217	1217	1217	1217	1217	1217	1217	1217
63	3.14	Viet Nam	123	131	181	248	309	320	320	383	408	408	567	703	794
66	3.15	Lebanon	39	47	49	53	53	72	72	79	79	79	90	128	154
70	3.16	Saudi Arabia	81	89	114	149	216	232	232	285	285	294	294	294	294
74	3.17	United Arab Emirates	8	8	8	8	8	8	8	8	79	110	110	110	110
76	3.18	(Palestine) West Bank and Gaza Strip	13	30	60	60	104	104	104	104	104	104	104	104	104
78	3.19	Qatar	10	10	23	23	23	23	23	23	23	23	23	42	42
79	3.20	Jordan	20	22	23	25	32	34	34	36	43	43	66	75	79
86	3.21	Sri Lanka	15	17	19	22	37	37	37	37	40	44	44	53	53
89	3.22	Yemen	7	7	8	8	8	8	8	8	8	8	10	10	10
91	3.23	Oman	3	3	4	5	10	10	10	13	13	19	19	19	19
92	3.24	Laos	3	3	5	5	7	7	7	7	51	51	51	51	51
93	3.25	Papua New Guinea	1	1	1	1	1	1	1	1	1	1	1	1	1
96	3.26	Bangladesh	1	12	18	19	22	22	22	22	24	24	24	30	30
97	3.27	Brunei	29	85	124	174	334	334	334	334	334	334	334	334	786
107	3.28	Cambodia	6	7	7	7	9	9	9	9	9	9	9	17	17
110	3.29	Indonesia	8	8	20	28	112	112	112	172	172	343	400	444	495
112	3.30	Iran	1	1	1	1	1	1	1	3	16	16	23	50	61
113	3.31	Iraq	11	11	12	16	20	20	20	26	26	26	36	36	49
116	3.32	Nepal	3	5	5	6	14	14	14	14	16	16	17	17	17
120	3.33	Myanmar	1	1	1	1	2	2	2	2	4	4	7	9	10
134	3.34	Syria			1	1	3	3	3	5	5	5	5	5	5
137	3.35	Afghanistan				14	15	15	15	15	15	15	15	15	15
156	3.36	Bhutan											2	2	2
157	3.37	Maldives											1	1	1
158	3.38	Kazakhstan												13	14
5	4.01	New Zealand	711	912	1059	1272	1984	2107	2230	2368	2443	2585	2585	2748	2797
29	4.02	Australia	4090	4568	5298	6353	10389	11194	11962	13178	14037	16768	17061	21109	21668
82	4.03	French Polynesia	2	2	4	4	5	5	5	5	5	5	5	5	16
85	4.04	Samoa	1	1	1	1	1	1	1	1	1	1	1	37	37
98	4.05	Fiji	2	2	2	5	73	73	73	73	73	73	73	97	97
108	4.06	Vanuatu	2	2	2	3	3	3	3	3	3	3	3	3	3
118	4.07	New Caledonia	6	6	12	12	34	34	34	46	46	46	46	46	112
125	4.08	Palau		1	1	1	1	1	1	1	1	1	1	1	1
135	4.09	Cook Islands			1	1	1	1	1	1	1	1	1	1	1
142	4.10	Guam					1	1	1	1	1	1	1	1	1
144	4.11	Tonga					2	2	2	2	2	2	2	9	9
153	4.12	Solomon Islands									2	2	2	2	2
155	4.13	Federated States of Micronesia									1	1	1	1	1
20	5.01	Colombia	93	101	118	138	175	185	190	202	221	245	245	259	270
25	5.02	Brazil	680	737	737	977	1027	1175	1175	1175	1175	1566	1566	1566	1566
28	5.03	Argentina	1587	1587	2485	2485	3056	3056	3056	3056	3056	3056	3056	3056	3056
35	5.04	Ecuador	163	163	204	204	277	277	277	374	394	455	477	696	696
36	5.05	Peru	538	538	916	1071	2082	2082	2082	2503	2796	3292	3292	3292	4029
40	5.06	Chile	6211	7376	7376	9024	10491	10491	10491	10926	11293	11641	11641	11641	11641
51	5.07	Uruguay	195	195	195	520	550	550	550	550	550	550	550	550	550
55	5.08	Paraguay	96	103	416	114	125	125	150	164	175	175	192	195	195
56	5.09	Bolivia	205	283	106	537	585	585	585	585	735	843	843	921	946
58	5.1	Venezuela	193	204	206	222	234	234	260	281	281	281	351	426	426
90	5.11	Suriname	11	11	11	11	11	11	11	11	11	11	11	14	14
130	5.12	Guyana			2	2	2	2	2	2	2	2	2	3	5
146	5.13	French Guiana					1	1	1	2	2	9	9	9	9
65	6.01	Egypt	67	67	78	79	102	108	108	130	157	157	185	226	226
77	6.02	Morocco	17	17	17	20	20	20	20	26	34	35	43	47	53
94	6.03	South Africa	1	12	18	31	93	103	103	103	103	119	119	151	151
99	6.04	Algeria	2	5	5	7	8	8	8	9	9	9	14	14	14
100	6.05	Cape Verde	3	3	3	3	3	3	3	3	3	4	6	6	6
102	6.06	Côte d'Ivoire	2	2	2	2	2	2	2	2	2	2	2	2	2
103	6.07	Tunisia	3	3	5	5	5	5	5	5	5	5	10	10	10
104	6.08	Ethiopia	2	3	3	3	3	3	3	3	3	3	4	4	4
117	6.09	Mauritius	7	1	1	1	1	1	1	1	1	2	2	2	2
121	6.10	Kenya	1	12	15	21	22	22	22	22	22	22	22	22	22
126	6.11	Uganda		1	1	1	5	6	6	7	7	7	7	8	8
136	6.12	Libya			1	1	1	4	4	6	9	9	9	9	9
138	6.13	Réunion				1	5	5	5	10	10	10	10	10	26
139	6.14	Seychelles				1	1	1	1	2	2	2	2	3	3
140	6.15	Tanzania					1	1	1	1	1	1	1	1	8
145	6.16	Botswana					2	2	2	2	4	4	4	4	4
150	6.17	Sudan							2	2	2	2	2	2	2
151	6.18	Namibia								2	2	2	4	4	4
159	6.19	Swaziland												2	2
165	6.20	Gabon													1

== Deaths ==
Swine flu deaths, July 2009
By date	By cont.	Country	1	3	6	15	16	17	20	22	24	27	29	31
0	0	World	332	382	429	667	679	702	781	883	917	998	1116	1152
0	0	Countries	17	17	19	25	26	26	29	32	33	34	39	43
1	1.01	Mexico	116	119	119	124	124	124	125	128	138	140	142	146
2	1.02	USA	127	170	170	211	211	211	263	263	263	302	302	302
3	1.03	Canada	25	25	25	39	45	45	45	50	55	55	58	59
4	1.04	Costa Rica	2	2	3	7	7	7	7	12	12	16	21	21
6	1.05	Dominican Republic	2	2	2	2	2	2	2	2	2	2	3	3
8	1.06	Guatemala	2	2	2	2	2	2	2	2	2	2	9	10
13	1.07	Honduras	1	1	1	1	1	1	1	1	1	1	1	4
21	1.08	El Salvador				3	3	3	3	5	5	6	9	9
22	1.09	Jamaica				2	2	2	2	2	2	2	2	2
30	1.10	Panama								1	1	1	2	2
37	1.11	Cayman Islands											1	1
38	1.12	Saint Kitts and Nevis											1	1
5	2.01	Chile	12	14	14	33	33	33	40	68	68	79	79	79
7	2.02	Colombia	2	2	2	7	7	7	8	8	9	9	13	17
9	2.03	Argentina	26	26	60	137	137	137	137	137	137	137	165	165
15	2.04	Brazil	1	1	1	3	4	4	4	4	34	34	34	34
16	2.05	Uruguay	1	1	4	9	9	9	9	20	20	21	22	22
19	2.06	Paraguay			1	3	3	3	8	10	10	14	14	14
20	2.07	Peru				5	5	5	11	14	20	23	24	29
24	2.08	Ecuador				3	3	3	5	5	7	14	17	17
25	2.09	Bolivia				2	2	2	2	3	4	6	7	7
27	2.10	Venezuela							1	1	1	1	2	2
10	3.01	UK	3	3	3	14	14	28	29	29	30	30	30	30
17	3.02	Spain	1	1	1	2	2	4	4	4	4	4	6	6
33	3.03	Hungary									1	1	1	1
40	3.04	Belgium												1
41	3.05	France												1
11	4.01	Australia	7	9	10	21	24	31	32	37	46	50	53	61
18	4.02	New Zealand			3	9	10	10	10	11	11	11	13	13
31	4.03	Tonga								1	1	1	1	1
12	5.01	Philippines	1	1	1	3	3	3	3	3	3	3	3	8
14	5.02	Thailand	3	3	7	24	24	24	24	24	24	24	65	65
23	5.03	Brunei				1	1	1	1	1	1	1	1	1
26	5.04	China					1	1	1	1	1	1	1	1
28	5.05	Singapore							1	1	2	4	5	5
32	5.06	Laos								1	1	1	1	1
34	5.07	Indonesia										1	1	1
35	5.08	Malaysia											4	4
39	5.09	Israel											1	1
36	5.10	Saudi Arabia											1	2
42	5.11	Lebanon												1
43	5.12	Taiwan												1
29	6.01	Egypt							1	1	1	1	1	1
