= 2009 flu pandemic table October 2009 =

This is a table containing the figures from the ECDC Influenza A Situation Updates issued in October 2009 roughly three times a week. From 30 September, ECDC only published deaths totals, and so the world cases table has not been maintained. The table can be sorted by country, date of first confirmed case or date of first confirmed case by continent.

This presentation of the data in this and other tables may show the progression, peaks, and, eventually, decline of the epidemic in each country and continent.

Summary tables | Previous month | Next month

== Deaths ==
Swine flu deaths, October 2009
By date	By cont.	Country or territory	2	5	7	9	12	14	16	19	21	23	26	28	30
0	0	World	4433	4495	4525	4579	4675	4703	4774	4804	5303	5382	5850	5938	6051
0	0	Countries	83	84	84	84	84	85	88	88	90	91	95	98	99
1	1.01	Mexico	231	236	242	245	248	248	255	260	260	271	278	314	328
2	1.02	United States	593	593	593	593	593	593	593	593	593	593	1004	1004	1004
3	1.03	Canada	78	78	78	78	79	79	80	80	80	83	86	86	89
4	1.04	Costa Rica	37	37	37	37	37	38	38	38	38	38	38	38	38
6	1.05	Dominican Republic	21	22	22	22	22	22	22	22	22	22	22	22	22
8	1.06	Guatemala	13	13	13	13	13	13	13	13	13	13	13	13	18
13	1.07	Honduras	15	16	16	16	16	16	16	16	16	16	16	16	16
21	1.08	El Salvador	19	19	20	20	20	20	20	20	22	22	22	22	22
22	1.09	Jamaica	4	4	4	4	4	5	5	5	5	5	5	5	5
30	1.10	Panama	11	11	11	11	11	11	11	11	11	11	11	11	11
37	1.11	(Cayman Islands) Cayman Is.	1	1	1	1	1	1	1	1	1	1	1	1	1
38	1.12	(Saint Kitts and Nevis) St Kitts and Nevis	1	1	1	1	1	1	1	1	1	1	1	1	1
55	1.13	Nicaragua	11	11	11	11	11	11	11	11	11	11	11	11	11
81	1.14	Barbados	1	1	2	2	2	2	2	3	3	3	3	3	3
84	1.15	Cuba		1	1	1	1	7	7	7	7	7	7	7	7
86	1.16	(The Bahamas) Bahamas							4	4	4	4	4	4	4
87	1.17	Trinidad and Tobago							2	2	4	4	5	5	5
5	2.01	Chile	132	132	132	132	134	134	134	134	134	134	136	136	136
7	2.02	Colombia	91	91	91	101	101	101	111	111	111	111	118	118	131
9	2.03	Argentina	538	539	539	539	580	580	580	580	580	580	585	585	585
15	2.04	Brazil	899	899	899	899	899	899	899	899	1368	1368	1368	1368	1368
16	2.05	Uruguay	33	33	33	33	33	33	33	33	33	33	33	33	33
19	2.06	Paraguay	52	52	52	52	52	52	52	52	52	52	52	52	52
20	2.07	Peru	143	143	143	143	153	153	153	162	162	162	162	162	162
24	2.08	Ecuador	60	64	64	64	67	67	67	70	70	70	70	70	75
25	2.09	Bolivia	54	55	55	56	56	56	56	56	56	56	56	56	56
27	2.10	Venezuela	83	84	85	87	89	89	91	91	91	93	93	95	95
73	2.11	Suriname	2	2	2	2	2	2	2	2	2	2	2	2	2
10	3.01	(United Kingdom) UK	82	85	85	89	91	93	106	106	108	128	128	130	137
17	3.02	Spain	42	42	42	43	43	43	45	45	45	54	54	54	54
33	3.03	Hungary	2	2	2	2	2	3	3	4	4	4	4	4	4
40	3.04	Belgium	2	2	2	2	2	2	3	5	5	5	5	5	7
41	3.05	France	30	30	30	31	31	31	32	32	32	36	36	36	44
46	3.06	Netherlands	4	4	4	4	4	4	4	4	4	4	6	6	6
50	3.07	(Republic of Ireland) Ireland	2	4	4	4	4	4	4	4	5	8	8	9	10
58	3.08	Malta	3	3	3	3	3	3	3	3	3	5	5	5	5
64	3.09	Greece	3	3	3	3	3	3	3	3	3	3	3	3	3
69	3.10	Sweden	2	2	2	2	2	2	2	2	2	2	2	2	2
70	3.11	Italy	3	3	3	3	4	4	4	4	4	4	4	4	4
71	3.12	Norway	4	4	4	6	6	6	6	6	7	8	10	11	13
77	3.13	Luxembourg	1	1	1	1	1	1	1	1	1	1	1	1	1
78	3.14	Portugal	2	2	2	2	2	2	2	3	3	3	3	3	4
82	3.15	Bulgaria	1	1	1	1	1	1	1	1	1	1	1	1	2
83	3.16	Germany	1	1	1	2	2	2	2	2	2	2	3	3	3
89	3.17	Iceland									1	1	1	1	1
91	3.18	Serbia										1	1	1	1
93	3.19	Moldova											1	1	1
94	3.20	Turkey											1	1	1
96	3.21	Russia												3	5
97	3.22	Czech Republic												1	1
98	3.23	Finland												1	1
11	4.01	Australia	180	183	183	185	185	185	185	185	185	186	186	186	186
18	4.02	New Zealand	18	18	18	18	18	18	18	18	18	19	19	19	19
31	4.03	Tonga	1	1	1	1	1	1	1	1	1	1	1	1	1
49	4.04	Samoa	2	2	2	2	2	2	2	2	2	2	2	2	2
59	4.05	Cook Islands	1	1	1	1	1	1	1	1	1	1	1	1	1
67	4.06	(Marshall Islands) Marshall Is.	1	1	1	1	1	1	1	1	1	1	1	1	1
79	4.07	(Solomon Islands) Solomon Is.	1	1	1	1	1	1	1	1	1	1	1	1	1
12	5.01	Philippines	28	28	28	28	28	28	28	28	28	28	28	30	30
14	5.02	Thailand	165	165	165	165	165	165	170	170	170	176	176	176	182
23	5.03	Brunei	1	1	1	1	1	1	1	1	1	1	1	1	1
26	5.04	China	23	24	25	25	31	31	34	35	35	36	36	37	43
28	5.05	Singapore	18	18	18	18	18	18	18	18	18	18	18	18	18
32	5.06	Laos	1	1	1	1	1	1	1	1	1	1	1	1	1
34	5.07	Indonesia	10	10	10	10	10	10	10	10	10	10	10	10	10
35	5.08	Malaysia	77	77	77	77	77	77	77	77	77	77	77	77	77
36	5.09	Saudi Arabia	30	35	35	36	36	36	36	36	36	36	39	39	39
39	5.10	Israel	28	28	30	31	31	31	32	32	32	32	32	35	35
43	5.11	Taiwan	19	19	21	22	22	22	24	24	24	25	25	25	27
44	5.12	Qatar	3	3	3	3	3	3	3	3	3	3	3	3	3
45	5.13	Lebanon	2	2	2	2	2	2	2	2	2	2	2	3	3
47	5.14	India	315	340	351	366	385	389	399	405	415	427	430	447	457
48	5.15	Vietnam	16	18	20	20	22	23	23	24	24	24	31	32	36
51	5.16	Iraq	1	1	2	2	2	2	2	2	2	2	3	4	4
52	5.17	Mauritius	8	8	8	8	8	8	8	8	8	8	8	8	8
53	5.18	(Palestine) West Bank and Gaza Strip	1	1	1	1	1	1	1	1	1	1	1	1	1
56	5.19	South Korea	11	11	11	11	12	15	15	15	20	20	20	28	33
57	5.20	Japan	18	20	20	20	20	20	23	23	27	27	27	27	27
60	5.21	Yemen	6	6	6	6	6	13	13	13	13	13	13	13	16
61	5.22	Kuwait	8	9	9	9	9	10	10	10	10	10	10	13	13
62	5.23	(United Arab Emirates) UAE	6	6	6	6	6	6	6	6	6	6	6	6	6
63	5.24	Oman	21	21	21	21	23	23	23	23	23	23	23	24	24
65	5.25	Iran	4	6	6	7	7	7	10	10	10	10	16	16	22
66	5.26	Syria	2	2	2	2	2	2	2	2	2	2	2	2	6
68	5.27	Bahrain	3	4	4	6	6	6	6	6	6	6	6	6	6
72	5.28	Bangladesh	4	4	4	4	4	4	4	4	5	5	6	6	6
80	5.29	Cambodia	1	1	3	3	3	3	3	3	3	3	3	3	4
85	5.30	Jordan						1	1	1	1	2	3	3	4
95	5.31	Mongolia											1	4	4
99	5.32	Afghanistan													1
29	6.01	Egypt	2	2	2	2	3	3	3	3	3	3	3	3	3
42	6.02	South Africa	84	84	84	91	91	91	91	91	91	91	91	91	91
54	6.03	Ghana	1	1	1	1	1	1	1	1	1	1	1	1	1
74	6.04	Namibia	1	1	1	1	1	1	1	1	1	1	1	1	1
75	6.05	Madagascar	1	1	1	1	1	1	1	1	1	1	1	1	1
76	6.06	Mozambique	2	2	2	2	2	2	2	2	2	2	2	2	2
88	6.07	Tanzania							1	1	1	1	1	1	1
90	6.08	Sudan									1	1	1	1	1
92	6.09	São Tomé and Príncipe											2	2	2
