= 2009 flu pandemic table June 2009 =

This is a table containing the figures from the WHO Influenza A Situation Updates issued in June 2009 roughly three times a week. The table can by sorted by country, date of first confirmed case or date of first confirmed case by continent.

This presentation of the data in this and other tables shows the progression, peaks, and, eventually, decline of the epidemic in each country and continent.

Summary tables | Previous month | Next month

== Confirmed cases ==
Swine flu cases, June 2009
By date	By cont.	Country	1	3	5	8	10	11	12	15	17	19	22	24	26	29
0	0	World	17398	19259	21924	25272	27713	28738	29633	35891	39620	44287	52160	55867	59814	70893
0	0	Days to double (approx)	15	16	16	14	14	15	15	14	14	14	14	14	14	15
0	0	Countries	63	67	70	74	75	75	75	77	89	94	99	108	112	116
1	1.01	Mexico	5029	5029	5563	5717	5717	6241	6241	6241	6241	7624	7624	7847	8279	8279
2	1.02	United States	8975	10053	11054	13217	13217	13217	13217	17855	17855	17855	21449	21449	21449	27717
3	1.03	Canada	1336	1530	1795	2115	2446	2446	2978	2978	4049	4905	5710	6457	6732	7775
16	1.04	Costa Rica	37	50	68	68	93	104	104	104	149	149	149	189	222	255
19	1.05	El Salvador	27	41	49	69	69	69	69	95	125	160	160	160	160	226
22	1.06	Guatemala	12	14	23	30	60	60	74	119	128	153	208	235	254	254
27	1.07	Panama	107	155	173	179	221	221	221	272	272	272	330	330	358	403
33	1.08	Cuba	4	4	4	5	5	5	6	6	7	15	15	15	34	34
46	1.09	Honduras	2	2	34	34	89	89	89	89	100	108	108	118	118	118
52	1.1	Dominican Republic	2	11	33	44	91	91	91	93	93	93	93	108	108	108
59	1.11	Bahamas	1	1	1	1	2	1	1	1	2	2	2	4	4	4
57	1.12	Jamaica	2	2	2	4	7	10	11	11	12	14	19	19	19	21
67	1.13	Nicaragua		1	5	18	29	45	56	56	118	144	189	220	265	277
68	1.14	Barbados			1	2	2	3	3	3	3	4	4	5	10	10
72	1.15	Cayman Islands				1	1	2	2	2	4	4	4	7	9	9
73	1.16	Dominica				1	1	1	1	1	1	1	1	1	1	1
71	1.17	Trinidad and Tobago				2	2	2	4	5	5	18	18	25	25	53
80	1.18	Bermuda									1	1	1	1	1	1
81	1.19	British Virgin Islands									1	1	1	1	1	1
83	1.20	Martinique									1	1	1	2	2	2
84	1.21	Netherlands Antilles									1	4	4	4	4	4
101	1.22	Antigua and Barbuda												2	2	2
4	2.01	Spain	178	180	218	291	331	357	488	488	499	512	522	539	541	541
7	2.02	United Kingdom	229	339	428	557	666	822	822	1226	1461	1752	2506	3254	3597	4250
9	2.03	Austria	1	1	2	5	5	7	7	7	7	8	9	12	12	12
8	2.04	Germany	28	28	43	63	78	95	95	170	195	238	275	301	333	366
10	2.05	Netherlands	3	4	4	10	22	30	35	61	68	87	91	110	116	118
11	2.06	Switzerland	8	10	10	16	16	20	20	22	27	27	31	33	47	49
13	2.07	Denmark	1	1	4	7	8	10	11	12	15	22	23	34	41	44
14	2.08	France	24	26	47	58	71	73	73	80	118	131	147	171	191	235
17	2.09	Ireland	4	4	8	11	12	12	12	12	12	16	23	23	29	39
18	2.1	Italy	29	30	38	50	50	54	56	67	72	88	88	96	102	112
21	2.11	Portugal	1	2	2	2	2	2	2	3	3	5	6	6	7	11
23	2.12	Sweden	4	7	13	14	16	19	19	32	37	43	48	55	61	67
24	2.13	Poland	4	4	4	5	6	7	7	7	7	7	13	13	13	14
30	2.14	Norway	4	4	9	9	9	13	13	13	13	17	17	23	22	31
31	2.15	Finland	3	4	4	4	4	4	4	4	12	13	13	26	26	26
34	2.16	Belgium	12	13	13	14	14	14	14	17	19	19	29	30	36	43
41	2.17	Greece	4	5	5	5	5	7	7	19	23	31	48	58	73	86
43	2.18	Russia	3	3	3	3	3	3	3	3	3	3	3	3	3	3
47	2.19	Iceland	1	1	1	1	2	3	4	4	4	4	4	4	4	4
50	2.2	Romania	3	5	8	9	9	11	11	13	16	18	18	19	19	24
53	2.21	Czech Republic	1	1	2	2	2	4	4	4	4	5	7	7	9	9
54	2.22	Slovakia	2	2	3	3	3	3	3	3	3	3	3	4	7	9
60	2.23	Cyprus	1	1	1	1	1	1	1	1	1	1	4	5	9	25
61	2.24	Estonia	1	1	3	3	4	4	4	4	4	5	5	5	8	13
62	2.25	Hungary	1	1	3	3	3	4	4	4	4	7	7	7	8	8
65	2.26	Bulgaria		1	1	2	2	2	2	2	2	2	2	5	7	7
69	2.27	Luxembourg			1	1	1	1	1	1	2	2	3	3	3	4
75	2.28	Ukraine					1	1	1	1	1	1	1	1	1	1
87	2.29	Isle of Man									1	1	1	1	1	1
88	2.30	Jersey									1	1	1	3	8	8
95	2.31	Slovenia											1	1	3	4
105	2.32	Latvia												1	1	1
106	2.33	Montenegro												1	1	1
109	2.34	Serbia													2	5
111	2.35	Guernsey													1	1
115	2.36	Lithuania														1
116	2.37	Monaco														1
6	3.01	Israel	19	33	39	54	63	68	68	117	152	219	291	375	405	469
12	3.02	China	52	69	89	108	142	174	188	318	382	519	739	906	1089	1442
15	3.03	Korea, Republic of	33	41	41	47	48	53	53	65	65	84	105	115	142	202
26	3.04	Japan	370	385	410	410	485	518	549	605	666	690	850	893	1049	1212
32	3.05	Thailand	2	2	8	8	8	8	8	29	310	518	589	774	774	774
38	3.06	India	1	1	4	4	4	9	9	16	30	30	44	64	64	64
37	3.07	Malaysia	2	2	2	5	5	5	5	5	17	23	23	68	68	112
39	3.08	Turkey	4	4	8	10	10	10	10	10	16	20	20	26	26	27
42	3.09	Philippines	16	16	29	33	54	77	77	77	193	311	344	445	445	861
44	3.1	Taiwan	12	14	16	16	24	36	36	37	58	60	61	61	61	61
45	3.11	Kuwait	18	18	18	18	18	18	18	18	18	18	26	26	30	30
48	3.12	Bahrain	1	1	1	1	1	1	1	1	12	12	15	15	15	15
49	3.13	Singapore	5	9	12	15	18	18	18	47	49	77	142	194	315	599
63	3.14	Viet Nam	1	3	3	9	15	16	23	25	27	27	35	56	63	84
64	3.15	Lebanon		3	3	3	8	8	8	8	11	12	12	25	25	25
70	3.16	Saudi Arabia			1	1	1	1	1	11	17	22	35	45	48	69
74	3.17	United Arab Emirates				1	1	1	1	1	1	2	2	2	7	8
76	3.18	(Palestine) West Bank and Gaza Strip								2	2	5	8	8	9	9
78	3.19	Qatar									3	3	8	10	10	10
79	3.20	Jordan									2	2	13	15	15	18
86	3.21	Sri Lanka									1	1	4	5	7	9
89	3.22	Yemen									1	4	5	6	6	6
91	3.23	Oman										3	3	3	3	3
92	3.24	Laos										1	2	3	3	3
93	3.25	Papua New Guinea										1	1	1	1	1
96	3.26	Bangladesh											1	1	1	1
97	3.27	Brunei											1	4	11	29
107	3.28	Cambodia												1	5	6
110	3.29	Indonesia													2	8
112	3.30	Iran													1	1
113	3.31	Iraq														10
114	3.32	Nepal														3
5	4.01	New Zealand	9	10	11	14	23	23	27	86	127	216	258	386	453	587
29	4.02	Australia	297	501	876	1051	1224	1307	1307	1823	2112	2199	2436	2857	3280	4038
82	4.03	French Polynesia									1	1	1	1	1	3
85	4.04	Samoa									1	1	1	1	1	1
98	4.05	Fiji											1	2	2	2
108	4.06	Vanuatu												1	2	2
20	5.01	Colombia	20	20	24	25	35	35	35	42	53	60	71	71	72	88
25	5.02	Brazil	20	25	31	38	43	52	55	74	96	131	240	399	522	625
28	5.03	Argentina	100	131	147	202	235	256	343	343	733	918	1010	1213	1391	1488
35	5.04	Ecuador	39	39	43	60	60	67	67	80	86	86	95	115	125	125
36	5.05	Peru	36	40	47	61	64	64	79	91	112	141	185	217	252	360
40	5.06	Chile	250	313	369	411	1694	1694	1694	1694	2335	3125	4315	4315	5186	5186
51	5.07	Uruguay	11	15	15	17	24	24	36	36	36	36	36	195	195	195
55	5.08	Paraguay	5	5	5	5	16	25	25	25	25	27	48	58	79	85
56	5.09	Bolivia	3	3	3	3	3	5	5	7	11	11	25	44	47	126
58	5.1	Venezuela	2	3	4	4	12	13	25	25	45	60	71	135	153	172
90	5.11	Suriname										11	11	11	11	11
66	6.01	Egypt		1	1	1	8	10	10	18	26	29	39	40	43	50
77	6.02	Morocco								1	3	8	6	9	11	11
94	6.03	South Africa										1	1	1	1	1
99	6.04	Algeria											1	2	2	2
100	6.05	Cape Verde												3	3	3
102	6.06	Côte d'Ivoire												2	2	2
103	6.07	Tunisia												2	2	2
104	6.08	Ethiopia												2	2	2

== Deaths ==
Swine flu deaths, June 2009
By date	By cont.	Country	1	3	5	8	10	11	12	15	17	19	22	24	26	29
0	0	World	115	117	125	139	141	144	145	163	167	180	231	238	263	311
0	0	Countries	4	4	5	6	6	7	8	9	10	11	11	12	13	13
1	1.01	Mexico	97	97	103	106	106	108	108	108	108	113	113	115	116	116
2	1.02	United States	15	17	17	27	27	27	27	45	44*	44	87	87	87	127
3	1.03	Canada	2	2	3	3	4	4	4	4	7	12	13	15	19	21
4	1.04	Costa Rica	1	1	1	1	1	1	1	1	1	1	1	1	1	1
6	1.05	Dominican Republic				1	1	1	1	1	1	1	1	2	2	2
8	1.06	Guatemala							1	1	1	1	1	1	2	2
13	1.07	Honduras													1	1
5	2.01	Chile			1	1	2	2	2	2	2	2	4	4	7	7
7	2.02	Colombia						1	1	1	1	1	2	2	2	2
9	2.03	Argentina								1	4	7	7	7	21	23
10	3.01	United Kingdom									1	1	1	1	1	1
11	4.01	Australia										1	1	2	3	7
12	5.01	Philippines												1	1	1
