= 2009 flu pandemic table November 2009 =

This is a table containing the figures from the ECDC Influenza A Situation Updates issued in November 2009 roughly three times a week. From 30 September, ECDC only published deaths totals, and so the world cases table has not been maintained. The table can be sorted by country, date of first confirmed case or date of first confirmed case by continent.

This presentation of the data in this and other tables may show the progression, peaks, and, eventually, decline of the epidemic in each country and continent.

Summary tables | Previous month | Next month

== Deaths ==
Swine flu deaths, November 2009
By date	By cont.	Country or territory	2	4	6	9	11	13	15	18	20	23	25	27	30
0	0	World	6,153	6,255	6,394	6,483	6,592	6,768	7,051	7,167	7,056	7,455	7,909	8,452	8,568
0	0	Countries	99	101	103	103	107	108	110	113	114	117	121	122	123
1	1.01	Mexico	354	377	377	398	433	452	482	482	520	573	573	589	610
2	1.02	United States	1,004	1,004	1,004	1,004	1,004	1,004	1,123	1,123	1,123	1,123	1,265	1,265	1,265
3	1.03	Canada	95	95	101	115	115	135	161	161	198	250	250	279	309
4	1.04	Costa Rica	38	38	38	38	38	38	38	38	38	38	40	40	40
6	1.05	Dominican Republic	22	22	22	22	22	22	22	22	22	22	22	22	22
8	1.06	Guatemala	18	18	18	18	18	18	18	18	18	18	18	18	18
13	1.07	Honduras	16	16	16	16	16	16	16	16	16	16	16	16	16
21	1.08	El Salvador	22	22	23	23	23	23	25	25	26	26	26	26	27
22	1.09	Jamaica	5	5	5	5	5	5	5	5	6	6	6	6	6
30	1.10	Panama	11	11	11	11	11	11	11	11	11	11	11	11	11
37	1.11	(Cayman Islands) Cayman Is.	1	1	1	1	1	1	1	1	1	1	1	1	1
38	1.12	Saint Kitts and Nevis	1	1	1	1	1	1	1	1	1	1	1	1	1
55	1.13	Nicaragua	11	11	11	11	11	11	11	11	11	11	11	11	11
81	1.14	Barbados	3	3	3	3	3	3	3	3	3	3	3	3	3
84	1.15	Cuba	7	7	7	7	7	7	7	7	7	7	7	7	7
86	1.16	(The Bahamas) Bahamas	4	4	4	4	4	4	4	4	4	4	4	4	4
87	1.17	Trinidad and Tobago	5	5	5	5	5	5	5	5	5	5	5	5	5
104	1.18	Saint Lucia					1	1	1	1	1	1	1	1	1
5	2.01	Chile	136	136	136	140	140	140	140	140	140	140	140	148	148
7	2.02	Colombia	131	131	136	136	136	141	141	141	151	151	151	160	160
9	2.03	Argentina	593	593	593	600	600	600	600	600	600	600	600	610	613
15	2.04	Brazil	1,368	1,368	1,368	1,368	1,368	1,368	1,368	1,368	1,368	1,368	1,368	1,528	1,528
16	2.05	Uruguay	33	33	33	33	33	33	33	33	33	33	33	33	33
19	2.06	Paraguay	52	52	52	52	52	52	52	52	52	52	52	52	52
20	2.07	Peru	162	162	180	180	180	183	183	183	190	190	190	190	190
24	2.08	Ecuador	75	75	80	80	80	82	82	82	82	82	82	82	82
25	2.09	Bolivia	56	56	56	56	56	56	57	57	57	57	57	57	58
27	2.10	Venezuela	95	95	95	97	97	103	103	104	104	107	107	113	114
73	2.11	Suriname	2	2	2	2	2	2	2	2	2	2	2	2	2
10	3.01	United Kingdom	137	142	154	155	155	180	185	187	215	216	216	245	246
17	3.02	Spain	63	63	73	73	73	88	88	88	115	115	115	135	135
33	3.03	Hungary	4	4	5	5	5	5	5	5	7	7	7	7	8
40	3.04	Belgium	7	7	8	8	8	8	11	11	12	12	12	13	13
41	3.05	France	44	44	49	49	57	59	59	70	76	84	85	96	104
46	3.06	Netherlands	10	10	10	17	17	17	22	22	22	28	28	28	36
50	3.07	(Republic of Ireland) Ireland	10	10	14	14	14	15	15	15	16	16	16	17	17
58	3.08	Malta	5	3	3	3	3	3	3	3	3	3	3	3	3
64	3.09	Greece	3	3	5	5	5	5	5	5	8	8	8	12	12
69	3.10	Sweden	2	2	3	3	3	5	5	5	11	11	11	15	15
70	3.11	Italy	4	17	25	29	34	38	44	58	62	70	82	91	93
71	3.12	Norway	13	15	15	15	16	16	18	21	23	23	23	25	25
77	3.13	Luxembourg	1	1	1	1	1	1	1	2	2	2	2	2	2
78	3.14	Portugal	4	5	5	5	5	5	6	7	8	11	14	17	18
82	3.15	Bulgaria	2	4	5	5	5	5	5	5	5	5	5	5	5
83	3.16	Germany	5	6	9	9	12	13	16	21	27	30	41	52	59
89	3.17	Iceland	1	1	1	1	1	1	1	1	1	1	1	2	2
91	3.18	Serbia	1	1	3	4	7	8	9	11	16	16	16	17	17
93	3.19	Moldova	1	1	2	3	4	4	6	7	7	8	10	11	11
94	3.20	Turkey	3	11	19	23	30	40	60	73	73	93	112	161	161
96	3.21	Russia	5	14	14	15	15	16	19	19	19	19	19	19	19
97	3.22	Czech Republic	1	1	1	1	1	1	1	1	2	2	3	6	8
98	3.23	Finland	1	1	2	2	5	6	7	9	9	12	12	16	16
100	3.24	Austria		1	1	1	1	1	1	1	3	3	3	3	3
101	3.25	Croatia		1	1	1	2	3	4	5	5	5	5	11	11
102	3.26	Belarus			7	7	7	7	7	7	7	7	20	20	20
103	3.27	Ukraine			1	1	1	14	14	15	15	15	15	18	18
105	3.28	Latvia					1	1	1	1	1	1	1	3	5
106	3.29	Slovakia					1	1	1	1	1	1	1	1	1
108	3.30	Azerbaijan						2	2	2	2	2	2	2	2
109	3.31	Kosovo							1	1	1	2	2	2	7
110	3.32	Poland							1	4	5	5	13	16	16
114	3.33	Bosnia and Herzegovina									1	1	1	1	1
115	3.33	(North Macedonia) Macedonia									1	1	1	1	3
116	3.34	Lithuania									1	1	2	2	2
117	3.35	Switzerland									1	1	1	3	3
118	3.36	Denmark										2	5	5	5
120	3.37	Romania											2	2	3
121	3.38	Slovenia											2	2	2
122	3.39	Estonia												1	1
11	4.01	Australia	186	186	186	187	187	187	189	189	189	189	189	190	190
18	4.02	New Zealand	19	19	19	19	19	19	19	19	20	20	20	20	20
31	4.03	Tonga	1	1	1	1	1	1	1	1	1	1	1	1	1
49	4.04	Samoa	2	2	2	2	2	2	2	2	2	2	2	2	2
59	4.05	Cook Islands	1	1	1	1	1	1	1	1	1	1	1	1	1
67	4.06	(Marshall Islands) Marshall Is.	1	1	1	1	1	1	1	1	1	1	1	1	1
79	4.07	(Solomon Islands) Solomon Is.	1	1	1	1	1	1	1	1	1	1	1	1	1
12	5.01	Philippines	30	30	30	30	30	30	30	30	30	30	30	30	30
14	5.02	Thailand	182	182	184	184	184	184	184	184	185	185	185	187	187
23	5.03	Brunei	1	1	1	1	1	1	1	1	1	1	1	1	1
26	5.04	China	43	46	49	57	71	77	85	95	95	95	95	147	147
28	5.05	Singapore	18	18	18	18	18	18	18	18	18	18	18	19	19
32	5.06	Laos	1	1	1	1	1	1	1	1	1	1	1	1	1
34	5.07	Indonesia	10	10	10	10	10	10	10	10	10	10	10	10	10
35	5.08	Malaysia	77	77	77	77	77	77	77	77	77	77	77	77	77
36	5.09	Saudi Arabia	62	62	66	66	66	66	66	66	66	70	81	81	81
39	5.10	Israel	35	39	39	39	39	39	41	48	48	48	52	55	55
43	5.11	Taiwan	27	27	27	27	27	27	27	29	29	29	29	30	30
44	5.12	Qatar	4	4	5	5	5	5	5	5	5	7	8	8	8
45	5.13	Lebanon	3	3	3	3	3	3	3	3	3	3	3	3	3
47	5.14	India	472	475	478	484	502	508	514	526	534	553	555	560	569
48	5.15	Vietnam	36	37	39	39	39	40	41	41	41	41	41	41	41
51	5.16	Iraq	4	7	7	7	7	7	7	9	9	9	10	10	10
52	5.17	Mauritius	8	8	8	8	8	8	8	8	8	8	8	8	8
53	5.18	(Palestine) West Bank and Gaza Strip	1	1	1	2	2	2	2	5	5	7	9	9	9
56	5.19	South Korea	34	42	45	48	52	52	64	64	82	82	82	104	104
57	5.20	Japan	27	27	28	28	28	28	28	28	28	28	28	28	28
60	5.21	Yemen	16	16	17	17	17	17	17	18	18	18	22	22	22
61	5.22	Kuwait	16	21	21	22	22	26	26	26	26	26	27	27	27
62	5.23	United Arab Emirates	6	6	6	6	6	6	6	6	6	6	6	6	6
63	5.24	Oman	24	25	25	25	25	25	27	27	27	27	27	27	27
65	5.25	Iran	22	28	33	33	33	58	58	58	100	100	100	140	140
66	5.26	Syria	7	7	7	7	7	7	13	22	22	22	50	50	50
68	5.27	Bahrain	6	6	6	6	6	6	6	7	7	7	7	7	7
72	5.28	Bangladesh	6	6	6	6	6	6	6	6	6	6	6	6	6
80	5.29	Cambodia	4	4	4	4	4	4	4	4	4	4	4	5	5
85	5.30	Jordan	4	7	7	7	7	7	10	11	11	11	11	14	14
95	5.31	Mongolia	4	4	6	8	8	8	15	15	15	17	17	18	18
99	5.32	Afghanistan	1	1	9	9	11	11	11	14	14	14	14	14	14
107	5.33	Sri Lanka					1	1	1	1	1	5	5	5	5
113	5.34	Pakistan								1	1	1	1	1	1
119	5.35	Maldives										1	1	1	1
29	6.01	Egypt	4	5	6	6	6	6	7	7	7	10	11	13	20
42	6.02	South Africa	91	91	91	91	91	91	91	91	91	91	91	91	91
54	6.03	Ghana	1	1	1	1	1	1	1	1	1	1	1	1	1
74	6.04	Namibia	1	1	1	1	1	1	1	1	1	1	1	1	1
75	6.05	Madagascar	1	1	1	1	1	1	1	1	1	1	1	1	1
76	6.06	Mozambique	2	2	2	2	2	2	2	2	2	2	2	2	2
88	6.07	Tanzania	1	1	1	1	1	1	1	1	1	1	1	1	1
90	6.08	Sudan	1	1	1	1	1	1	1	1	1	1	1	1	1
92	6.09	São Tomé and Príncipe	2	2	2	2	2	2	2	2	2	2	2	2	2
111	6.10	Tunisia								2	2	2	2	2	2
112	6.11	Morocco								1	1	1	1	1	1
123	6.12	Algeria													3
