= 2009 flu pandemic table December 2009 =

This is a table containing the figures from the ECDC Influenza A Situation Updates issued in December 2009 roughly three times a week. From 30 September, ECDC only published deaths totals, and so the world cases table has not been maintained. The table can be sorted by country, date of first confirmed case or date of first confirmed case by continent.

This presentation of the data in this and other tables may show the progression, peaks, and, eventually, decline of the epidemic in each country and continent.

Summary tables | Previous month | Next month

== Deaths ==
Swine flu deaths, December 2009 to date
| By date | By cont. | Country or territory | 2 | 4 | 7 | 9 | 11 | 14 | 16 | 18 | 21 |
|---|---|---|---|---|---|---|---|---|---|---|---|
| 0 | 0 | World | 8,748 | 9,634 | 9,797 | 10,074 | 10,567 | 10,863 | 11,188 | 11,877 | 12,040 |
| 0 | 0 | Countries | 124 | 124 | 125 | 126 | 126 | 127 | 128 | 128 | 128 |
| 1 | 1.01 | Mexico | 656 | 656 | 671 | 671 | 713 | 732 | 732 | 770 | 780 |
| 2 | 1.02 | United States | 1,265 | 1,817 | 1,817 | 1,817 | 1,929 | 1,929 | 1,929 | 2,038 | 2,038 |
| 3 | 1.03 | Canada | 309 | 329 | 357 | 357 | 363 | 373 | 373 | 390 | 397 |
| 4 | 1.04 | Costa Rica | 40 | 40 | 40 | 41 | 41 | 41 | 41 | 41 | 47 |
| 6 | 1.05 | Dominican Republic | 22 | 23 | 23 | 23 | 23 | 23 | 23 | 23 | 23 |
| 8 | 1.06 | Guatemala | 18 | 18 | 18 | 18 | 18 | 18 | 18 | 18 | 18 |
| 13 | 1.07 | Honduras | 16 | 16 | 16 | 16 | 16 | 16 | 16 | 16 | 16 |
| 21 | 1.08 | El Salvador | 27 | 27 | 27 | 30 | 30 | 31 | 31 | 31 | 31 |
| 22 | 1.09 | Jamaica | 6 | 6 | 6 | 6 | 6 | 6 | 6 | 6 | 6 |
| 30 | 1.10 | Panama | 11 | 11 | 11 | 11 | 11 | 11 | 11 | 11 | 11 |
| 37 | 1.11 | Cayman Islands | 1 | 1 | 1 | 1 | 1 | 1 | 1 | 1 | 1 |
| 38 | 1.12 | Saint Kitts and Nevis | 1 | 1 | 1 | 1 | 1 | 1 | 2 | 2 | 2 |
| 55 | 1.13 | Nicaragua | 11 | 11 | 11 | 11 | 11 | 11 | 11 | 11 | 11 |
| 81 | 1.14 | Barbados | 3 | 3 | 3 | 3 | 3 | 3 | 3 | 3 | 3 |
| 84 | 1.15 | Cuba | 7 | 27 | 27 | 27 | 32 | 32 | 32 | 32 | 32 |
| 86 | 1.16 | Bahamas | 4 | 4 | 4 | 4 | 4 | 4 | 4 | 4 | 4 |
| 87 | 1.17 | Trinidad and Tobago | 5 | 5 | 5 | 5 | 5 | 5 | 5 | 5 | 5 |
| 104 | 1.18 | Saint Lucia | 1 | 1 | 1 | 1 | 1 | 1 | 1 | 1 | 1 |
| 5 | 2.01 | Chile | 148 | 148 | 148 | 150 | 150 | 150 | 150 | 150 | 150 |
| 7 | 2.02 | Colombia | 160 | 163 | 163 | 183 | 183 | 183 | 183 | 190 | 190 |
| 9 | 2.03 | Argentina | 613 | 613 | 613 | 613 | 613 | 616 | 616 | 616 | 617 |
| 15 | 2.04 | Brazil | 1,528 | 1,528 | 1,528 | 1,528 | 1,528 | 1,632 | 1,632 | 1,632 | 1,632 |
| 16 | 2.05 | Uruguay | 33 | 33 | 33 | 33 | 33 | 33 | 33 | 33 | 33 |
| 19 | 2.06 | Paraguay | 52 | 52 | 52 | 52 | 52 | 52 | 52 | 52 | 52 |
| 20 | 2.07 | Peru | 190 | 200 | 200 | 200 | 200 | 200 | 200 | 203 | 203 |
| 24 | 2.08 | Ecuador | 82 | 88 | 88 | 88 | 96 | 96 | 96 | 96 | 96 |
| 25 | 2.09 | Bolivia | 58 | 58 | 58 | 58 | 58 | 58 | 58 | 58 | 58 |
| 27 | 2.10 | Venezuela | 114 | 115 | 115 | 115 | 116 | 116 | 116 | 116 | 116 |
| 73 | 2.11 | Suriname | 2 | 2 | 2 | 2 | 2 | 2 | 2 | 2 | 2 |
| 10 | 3.01 | United Kingdom | 250 | 270 | 270 | 270 | 283 | 283 | 284 | 298 | 298 |
| 17 | 3.02 | Spain | 135 | 169 | 169 | 169 | 169 | 208 | 208 | 232 | 232 |
| 33 | 3.03 | Hungary | 8 | 8 | 8 | 8 | 23 | 23 | 23 | 36 | 36 |
| 40 | 3.04 | Belgium | 13 | 14 | 14 | 14 | 14 | 14 | 14 | 17 | 17 |
| 41 | 3.05 | France | 114 | 124 | 143 | 150 | 158 | 171 | 177 | 182 | 196 |
| 46 | 3.06 | Netherlands | 36 | 36 | 42 | 42 | 42 | 50 | 50 | 50 | 51 |
| 50 | 3.07 | Ireland | 17 | 18 | 18 | 18 | 20 | 20 | 20 | 22 | 22 |
| 58 | 3.08 | Malta | 3 | 3 | 3 | 3 | 3 | 3 | 3 | 3 | 3 |
| 64 | 3.09 | Greece | 12 | 21 | 21 | 21 | 36 | 36 | 36 | 51 | 51 |
| 69 | 3.10 | Sweden | 15 | 16 | 16 | 16 | 18 | 18 | 19 | 20 | 20 |
| 70 | 3.11 | Italy | 95 | 111 | 111 | 114 | 137 | 137 | 149 | 149 | 178 |
| 71 | 3.12 | Norway | 25 | 25 | 25 | 25 | 27 | 27 | 27 | 29 | 29 |
| 77 | 3.13 | Luxembourg | 2 | 2 | 2 | 2 | 2 | 2 | 2 | 2 | 2 |
| 78 | 3.14 | Portugal | 21 | 23 | 23 | 23 | 35 | 35 | 44 | 46 | 46 |
| 82 | 3.15 | Bulgaria | 5 | 5 | 5 | 5 | 5 | 5 | 5 | 35 | 35 |
| 83 | 3.16 | Germany | 60 | 66 | 66 | 66 | 94 | 94 | 94 | 119 | 119 |
| 89 | 3.17 | Iceland | 2 | 2 | 2 | 2 | 2 | 2 | 2 | 2 | 2 |
| 91 | 3.18 | Serbia | 22 | 22 | 22 | 26 | 32 | 33 | 34 | 37 | 38 |
| 93 | 3.19 | Moldova | 12 | 13 | 13 | 13 | 13 | 13 | 15 | 16 | 16 |
| 94 | 3.20 | Turkey | 195 | 195 | 241 | 296 | 353 | 353 | 415 | 415 | 415 |
| 96 | 3.21 | Russia | 19 | 19 | 19 | 19 | 19 | 19 | 19 | 19 | 19 |
| 97 | 3.22 | Czech Republic | 8 | 22 | 22 | 22 | 34 | 34 | 34 | 38 | 38 |
| 98 | 3.23 | Finland | 16 | 17 | 17 | 17 | 17 | 17 | 36 | 36 | 36 |
| 100 | 3.24 | Austria | 3 | 3 | 3 | 3 | 3 | 3 | 3 | 3 | 3 |
| 101 | 3.25 | Croatia | 11 | 19 | 19 | 19 | 22 | 22 | 22 | 22 | 22 |
| 102 | 3.26 | Belarus | 20 | 20 | 20 | 20 | 20 | 20 | 20 | 20 | 20 |
| 103 | 3.27 | Ukraine | 41 | 41 | 41 | 41 | 41 | 41 | 41 | 202 | 202 |
| 105 | 3.28 | Latvia | 8 | 12 | 12 | 14 | 14 | 14 | 17 | 17 | 17 |
| 106 | 3.29 | Slovakia | 1 | 1 | 3 | 3 | 3 | 3 | 3 | 21 | 25 |
| 108 | 3.30 | Azerbaijan | 2 | | | | | | | | |
| 109 | 3.31 | Kosovo | 7 | 10 | 10 | 10 | 10 | 10 | 10 | 10 | 10 |
| 110 | 3.32 | Poland | 24 | 24 | 24 | 24 | 24 | 67 | 67 | 67 | 97 |
| 114 | 3.33 | Bosnia and Herzegovina | 1 | 3 | 3 | 5 | 5 | 7 | 7 | 7 | 7 |
| 115 | 3.33 | Macedonia | 4 | 4 | 6 | 7 | 7 | 7 | 14 | 14 | 14 |
| 116 | 3.34 | Lithuania | 5 | 6 | 7 | 7 | 9 | 10 | 12 | 13 | 14 |
| 117 | 3.35 | Switzerland | 3 | 3 | 7 | 7 | 8 | 8 | 8 | 9 | 9 |
| 118 | 3.36 | Denmark | 6 | 9 | 10 | 11 | 16 | 16 | 16 | 21 | 21 |
| 120 | 3.37 | Romania | 3 | 6 | 12 | 14 | 16 | 18 | 25 | 29 | 32 |
| 121 | 3.38 | Slovenia | 7 | 7 | 7 | 8 | 8 | 8 | 8 | 13 | 13 |
| 122 | 3.39 | Estonia | 1 | 1 | 4 | 4 | 5 | 5 | 5 | 7 | 7 |
| 125 | 3.40 | Montenegro | | 1 | 1 | 2 | 2 | 2 | 2 | 2 | 2 |
| 126 | 3.41 | Albania | | | 1 | 1 | 1 | 1 | 3 | 3 | 5 |
| 127 | 3.42 | Cyprus | | | | 2 | 2 | 2 | 2 | 3 | 3 |
| 128 | 3.43 | Georgia | | | | | | 1 | 3 | 5 | 5 |
| 129 | 3.44 | Armenia | | | | | | | 2 | 2 | 2 |
| 11 | 4.01 | Australia | 190 | 190 | 190 | 191 | 191 | 191 | 191 | 191 | 191 |
| 18 | 4.02 | New Zealand | 20 | 20 | 20 | 20 | 20 | 20 | 20 | 20 | 20 |
| 31 | 4.03 | Tonga | 1 | 1 | 1 | 1 | 1 | 1 | 1 | 1 | 1 |
| 49 | 4.04 | Samoa | 2 | 2 | 2 | 2 | 2 | 2 | 2 | 2 | 2 |
| 59 | 4.05 | Cook Islands | 1 | 1 | 1 | 1 | 1 | 1 | 1 | 1 | 1 |
| 67 | 4.06 | Marshall Islands | 1 | 1 | 1 | 1 | 1 | 1 | 1 | 1 | 1 |
| 79 | 4.07 | Solomon Islands | 1 | 1 | 1 | 1 | 1 | 1 | 1 | 1 | 1 |
| 12 | 5.01 | Philippines | 30 | 30 | 30 | 30 | 30 | 30 | 30 | 30 | 30 |
| 14 | 5.02 | Thailand | 187 | 187 | 187 | 187 | 189 | 189 | 189 | 190 | 190 |
| 23 | 5.03 | Brunei | 1 | 1 | 1 | 1 | 1 | 1 | 1 | 1 | 1 |
| 26 | 5.04 | China | 147 | 223 | 223 | 316 | 373 | 373 | 373 | 489 | 489 |
| 28 | 5.05 | Singapore | 19 | 19 | 19 | 19 | 19 | 19 | 19 | 19 | 19 |
| 32 | 5.06 | Laos | 1 | 1 | 1 | 1 | 1 | 1 | 1 | 1 | 1 |
| 34 | 5.07 | Indonesia | 10 | 10 | 10 | 10 | 10 | 10 | 10 | 10 | 10 |
| 35 | 5.08 | Malaysia | 77 | 77 | 77 | 77 | 77 | 77 | 77 | 77 | 77 |
| 36 | 5.09 | Saudi Arabia | 81 | 81 | 81 | 81 | 81 | 81 | 97 | 97 | 97 |
| 39 | 5.10 | Israel | 63 | 66 | 66 | 67 | 67 | 67 | 67 | 69 | 69 |
| 43 | 5.11 | Taiwan | 30 | 32 | 32 | 33 | 33 | 33 | 35 | 35 | 35 |
| 44 | 5.12 | Qatar | 8 | 8 | 8 | 8 | 8 | 8 | 8 | 8 | 8 |
| 45 | 5.13 | Lebanon | 3 | 3 | 3 | 3 | 3 | 3 | 3 | 3 | 3 |
| 47 | 5.14 | India | 575 | 591 | 608 | 627 | 655 | 674 | 725 | 759 | 777 |
| 48 | 5.15 | Vietnam | 44 | 44 | 44 | 44 | 44 | 47 | 47 | 47 | 47 |
| 51 | 5.16 | Iraq | 15 | 26 | 26 | 33 | 34 | 34 | 34 | 34 | 37 |
| 52 | 5.17 | Mauritius | 8 | 8 | 8 | 8 | 8 | 8 | 8 | 8 | 8 |
| 53 | 5.18 | (Palestine) West Bank and Gaza Strip | 9 | 9 | 9 | 9 | 9 | 9 | 17 | 17 | 17 |
| 56 | 5.19 | South Korea | 104 | 117 | 117 | 117 | 117 | 117 | 132 | 132 | 132 |
| 57 | 5.20 | Japan | 28 | 28 | 28 | 65 | 65 | 65 | 73 | 73 | 73 |
| 60 | 5.21 | Yemen | 22 | 22 | 22 | 22 | 22 | 22 | 22 | 25 | 25 |
| 61 | 5.22 | Kuwait | 27 | 27 | 27 | 27 | 27 | 27 | 27 | 27 | 27 |
| 62 | 5.23 | United Arab Emirates | 6 | 6 | 6 | 6 | 6 | 6 | 6 | 6 | 6 |
| 63 | 5.24 | Oman | 27 | 27 | 27 | 27 | 27 | 27 | 30 | 30 | 30 |
| 65 | 5.25 | Iran | 140 | 140 | 147 | 147 | 147 | 147 | 147 | 147 | 147 |
| 66 | 5.26 | Syria | 50 | 50 | 50 | 50 | 50 | 50 | 103 | 103 | 103 |
| 68 | 5.27 | Bahrain | 7 | 7 | 7 | 7 | 7 | 7 | 7 | 7 | 7 |
| 72 | 5.28 | Bangladesh | 6 | 6 | 6 | 6 | 6 | 6 | 6 | 6 | 6 |
| 80 | 5.29 | Cambodia | 5 | 5 | 5 | 5 | 5 | 5 | 5 | 5 | 6 |
| 85 | 5.30 | Jordan | 14 | 14 | 14 | 14 | 14 | 14 | 14 | 16 | 16 |
| 95 | 5.31 | Mongolia | 18 | 24 | 24 | 24 | 24 | 24 | 26 | 26 | 26 |
| 99 | 5.32 | Afghanistan | 16 | 16 | 16 | 16 | 16 | 17 | 17 | 17 | 17 |
| 107 | 5.33 | Sri Lanka | 5 | 5 | 5 | 5 | 10 | 23 | 23 | 23 | 23 |
| 113 | 5.34 | Pakistan | 1 | 1 | 1 | 1 | 1 | 1 | 1 | 1 | 1 |
| 119 | 5.35 | Maldives | 1 | 1 | 1 | 1 | 1 | 1 | 1 | 1 | 1 |
| 29 | 6.01 | Egypt | 21 | 23 | 24 | 32 | 35 | 46 | 61 | 68 | 80 |
| 42 | 6.02 | South Africa | 92 | 92 | 92 | 92 | 92 | 92 | 92 | 92 | 92 |
| 54 | 6.03 | Ghana | 1 | 1 | 1 | 1 | 1 | 1 | 1 | 1 | 1 |
| 74 | 6.04 | Namibia | 1 | 1 | 1 | 1 | 1 | 1 | 1 | 1 | 1 |
| 75 | 6.05 | Madagascar | 1 | 2 | 3 | 3 | 3 | 3 | 3 | 3 | 3 |
| 76 | 6.06 | Mozambique | 2 | 2 | 2 | 2 | 2 | 2 | 2 | 2 | 2 |
| 88 | 6.07 | Tanzania | 1 | 1 | 1 | 1 | 1 | 1 | 1 | 1 | 1 |
| 90 | 6.08 | Sudan | 1 | 1 | 1 | 1 | 1 | 1 | 1 | 1 | 1 |
| 92 | 6.09 | São Tomé and Príncipe | 2 | 2 | 2 | 2 | 2 | 2 | 2 | 2 | 2 |
| 111 | 6.10 | Tunisia | 2 | 2 | 4 | 4 | 5 | 5 | 6 | 6 | 9 |
| 112 | 6.11 | Morocco | 4 | 4 | 4 | 5 | 12 | 14 | 23 | 24 | 33 |
| 123 | 6.12 | Algeria | 3 | 7 | 8 | 10 | 16 | 16 | 19 | 24 | 32 |
| 124 | 6.13 | Libya | 1 | 1 | 1 | 1 | 1 | 1 | 1 | 1 | 1 |
