= 2009 flu pandemic table September 2009 =

This is a table containing the figures from the ECDC Influenza A Situation Updates issued in September 2009 roughly three times a week. From 10 August, ECDC only published deaths totals outside its area, and so the world cases table has not been maintained. The table can be sorted by country, date of first confirmed case or date of first confirmed case by continent.

This presentation of the data in this and other tables may show the progression, peaks, and, eventually, decline of the epidemic in each country and continent.

Summary tables | Previous month | Next month

== Deaths ==
Swine flu deaths, September 2009
By date	By cont.	Country or territory	2	4	7	9	11	14	16	18	21	23	25	28	30
0	0	World	3097	3315	3402	3529	3593	3639	3750	4040	4091	4144	4216	4282	4335
0	0	Countries	69	72	72	74	75	75	76	77	77	77	78	78	80
1	1.01	Mexico	193	199	207	207	209	211	217	217	220	220	222	226	226
2	1.02	United States	556	556	593	593	593	593	593	593	593	593	593	593	593
3	1.03	Canada	72	72	72	73	74	74	76	76	76	76	78	78	78
4	1.04	Costa Rica	33	33	33	33	33	33	33	37	37	37	37	37	37
6	1.05	Dominican Republic	8	8	11	11	11	17	17	17	17	21	21	21	21
8	1.06	Guatemala	12	13	13	13	13	13	13	13	13	13	13	13	13
13	1.07	Honduras	8	10	10	12	12	14	14	14	14	14	14	15	15
21	1.08	El Salvador	17	17	17	17	17	17	17	17	19	19	19	19	19
22	1.09	Jamaica	4	4	4	4	4	4	4	4	4	4	4	4	4
30	1.10	Panama	7	9	9	10	10	10	10	10	10	10	10	11	11
37	1.11	(Cayman Islands) Cayman Is.	1	1	1	1	1	1	1	1	1	1	1	1	1
38	1.12	(Saint Kitts and Nevis) St Kitts and Nevis	1	1	1	1	1	1	1	1	1	1	1	1	1
55	1.13	Nicaragua	4	4	4	6	6	6	6	7	9	9	9	9	9
5	2.01	Chile	130	130	130	130	132	132	132	132	132	132	132	132	132
7	2.02	Colombia	35	35	35	43	43	45	65	65	65	65	82	82	82
9	2.03	Argentina	465	465	465	512	512	512	514	514	514	514	514	538	538
15	2.04	Brazil	557	657	657	657	657	657	657	899	899	899	899	899	899
16	2.05	Uruguay	32	32	32	32	33	33	33	33	33	33	33	33	33
19	2.06	Paraguay	41	41	52	52	52	52	52	52	52	52	52	52	52
20	2.07	Peru	98	98	98	109	109	109	121	121	121	133	133	133	143
24	2.08	Ecuador	40	40	40	44	55	55	55	55	55	55	55	55	60
25	2.09	Bolivia	19	29	30	30	35	35	35	40	40	40	41	43	47
27	2.10	Venezuela	24	41	41	52	52	52	54	54	67	71	76	76	76
73	2.11	Suriname				1	1	1	1	1	1	1	2	2	2
10	3.01	(United Kingdom) UK	65	70	70	70	76	76	76	78	78	78	82	82	82
17	3.02	Spain	21	23	23	23	23	25	25	32	32	32	36	36	36
33	3.03	Hungary	1	1	1	1	1	1	1	1	1	1	2	2	2
40	3.04	Belgium	1	1	1	1	1	1	1	1	1	1	1	1	1
41	3.05	France	10	14	14	14	19	20	20	26	27	28	29	29	29
46	3.06	Netherlands	2	2	2	2	2	2	2	4	4	4	4	4	4
50	3.07	(Republic of Ireland) Ireland	2	2	2	2	2	2	2	2	2	2	2	2	2
58	3.08	Malta	1	2	2	2	2	2	2	3	3	3	3	3	3
64	3.09	Greece	1	2	2	2	2	2	3	3	3	3	3	3	3
69	3.10	Sweden	1	1	2	2	2	2	2	2	2	2	2	2	2
70	3.11	Italy		1	1	1	1	1	1	1	1	1	3	3	3
71	3.12	Norway		1	1	1	2	2	2	3	3	3	4	4	4
77	3.13	Luxembourg								1	1	1	1	1	1
78	3.14	Portugal											1	2	2
11	4.01	Australia	155	161	161	162	169	169	171	172	172	172	178	178	178
18	4.02	New Zealand	17	17	17	17	17	17	17	17	17	17	17	17	17
31	4.03	Tonga	1	1	1	1	1	1	1	1	1	1	1	1	1
49	4.04	Samoa	2	2	2	2	2	2	2	2	2	2	2	2	2
59	4.05	Cook Islands	1	1	1	1	1	1	1	1	1	1	1	1	1
67	4.06	Marshall Islands	1	1	1	1	1	1	1	1	1	1	1	1	1
79	4.07	Solomon Islands													1
12	5.01	Philippines	8	28	28	28	28	28	28	28	28	28	28	28	28
14	5.02	Thailand	130	130	130	142	142	142	153	153	153	153	160	160	160
23	5.03	Brunei	1	1	1	1	1	1	1	1	1	1	1	1	1
26	5.04	China	9	11	13	13	14	14	14	15	15	17	20	22	23
28	5.05	Singapore	16	17	18	18	18	18	18	18	18	18	18	18	18
32	5.06	Laos	1	1	1	1	1	1	1	1	1	1	1	1	1
34	5.07	Indonesia	8	10	10	10	10	10	10	10	10	10	10	10	10
35	5.08	Malaysia	72	73	73	73	74	74	76	76	77	77	77	77	77
36	5.09	Saudi Arabia	19	23	23	26	26	26	28	28	28	28	28	28	28
39	5.10	Israel	16	21	21	21	21	22	22	23	23	23	23	23	23
43	5.11	Taiwan	5	6	7	10	12	14	14	14	16	16	16	17	18
44	5.12	Qatar	1	1	1	1	1	2	2	2	2	2	3	3	3
45	5.13	Lebanon	1	1	1	2	2	2	2	2	2	2	2	2	2
47	5.14	India	101	111	131	138	154	176	201	214	238	257	264	277	302
48	5.15	Vietnam	2	2	2	3	5	6	6	6	7	9	10	13	14
51	5.16	Iraq	1	1	1	1	1	1	1	1	1	1	1	1	1
52	5.17	Mauritius	7	8	8	8	8	8	8	8	8	8	8	8	8
53	5.18	(Palestine) West Bank and Gaza Strip	1	1	1	1	1	1	1	1	1	1	1	1	1
56	5.19	South Korea	4	4	4	5	5	7	8	8	9	9	11	11	11
57	5.20	Japan	3	10	10	10	10	10	10	10	10	18	18	18	18
60	5.21	Yemen	1	1	1	1	1	1	1	1	1	1	3	3	6
61	5.22	Kuwait	5	5	5	5	5	5	7	7	7	7	7	7	7
62	5.23	(United Arab Emirates) UAE	2	4	4	6	6	6	6	6	6	6	6	6	6
63	5.24	Oman	10	10	10	12	12	13	18	18	18	18	19	21	21
65	5.25	Iran	2	2	2	2	2	2	2	4	4	4	4	4	4
66	5.26	Syria	2	2	2	2	2	2	2	2	2	2	2	2	2
68	5.27	Bahrain	1	3	3	3	3	3	3	3	3	3	3	3	3
72	5.28	Bangladesh		1	2	3	3	4	4	4	4	4	4	4	4
80	5.29	Cambodia													1
29	6.01	Egypt	1	1	2	2	2	2	2	2	2	2	2	2	2
42	6.02	South Africa	27	27	27	31	31	31	47	47	47	47	47	59	59
54	6.03	Ghana	1	1	1	1	1	1	1	1	1	1	1	1	1
74	6.04	Namibia				1	1	1	1	1	1	1	1	1	1
75	6.05	Madagascar					1	1	1	1	1	1	1	1	1
76	6.06	Mozambique							1	1	2	2	2	2	2
