= 2009 flu pandemic table August 2009 =

This is a table containing the figures from the ECDC Influenza A Situation Updates issued in August 2009 roughly three times a week. From 10 August, ECDC only published deaths totals outside its area. The table can by sorted by country, date of first confirmed case or date of first confirmed case by continent.

This presentation of the data in this and other tables may show the progression, peaks, and, eventually, decline of the epidemic in each country and continent.

Summary tables | Previous month | Next month

== Confirmed cases ==
Swine flu cases, August 2009
By date	By cont.	Country or territory	3	5	9	10	12	14	17	19	21	24	26	28	31
0	0	World	188333	199082	208269	212008	219681	226065	231353	243587	248941	253169	253169	268609	268609
0	0	Days to double (approx)	28	29	31	32	33	35	36	37	38	39	41	42	44
0	0	Countries	168	170	175										
1	1.01	Mexico	16442	17416	17530										
2	1.02	United States of America	43771	43771	43771										
3	1.03	Canada	10449	10449	10449										
16	1.04	Costa Rica	668	755	798										
19	1.05	El Salvador	556	556	595										
22	1.06	Guatemala	558	558	558										
27	1.07	Panama	588	600	600										
33	1.08	Cuba	234	234	264										
46	1.09	Honduras	169	190	254										
52	1.1	Dominican Republic	154	154	182										
59	1.11	Bahamas	29	29	29										
57	1.12	Jamaica	62	62	64										
67	1.13	Nicaragua	432	472	510										
68	1.14	Barbados	23	31	39										
72	1.15	Cayman Islands	60	60	88										
73	1.16	Dominica	1	1	1										
71	1.17	Trinidad and Tobago	97	97	106										
80	1.18	Bermuda	4	4	8										
81	1.19	British Virgin Islands	5	5	8										
83	1.20	Martinique	3	3	3										
84	1.21	Netherlands Antilles	19	19	19										
101	1.22	Antigua and Barbuda	3	3	4										
119	1.23	Saint Lucia	3	3	6										
122	1.24	Aruba	13	13	13										
127	1.25	Puerto Rico	18	18	18										
128	1.26	Guadeloupe	2	2	2										
131	1.27	Saint Martin	1	1	1										
132	1.28	United States Virgin Islands	1	1	1										
143	1.29	Saint Vincent and the Grenadines	1	1	1										
147	1.30	Belize	23	23	27										
148	1.31	Haiti	3	5	5										
149	1.32	Saint Kitts and Nevis	3	3	4										
160	1.33	Grenada	1	1	2										
167	1.34	Turks and Caicos Islands	12	12	12										
170	1.35	Anguilla		1	1										
4	2.01	Spain	1538	1538	1538	1538	1538	1538	1538	1538	1538	1538	1538	1538	1538
7	2.02	United Kingdom	11912	11912	12470	12470	12470	12903	12903	12903	12957	12957	12957	13095	13095
9	2.03	Austria	153	178	192	192	222	222	222	222	270	270	270	302	314
8	2.04	Germany	6800	7963	9213	9770	10600	11493	12120	12830	13740	14325	14940	15567	15878
10	2.05	Netherlands	517	517	912	912	1021	1473	1473	1473	1473	1473	1473	1473	1473
11	2.06	Switzerland	484	535	609	609	670	726	747	841	857	883	971	1003	1014
13	2.07	Denmark	254	280	354	354	391	444	444	444	520	520	537	543	543
14	2.08	France	719	556	880	880	1125	1125	1125	1125	1125	1125	1125	1125	1125
17	2.09	Ireland	276	276	475	475	475	574	574	574	678	678	678	767	767
18	2.1	Italy	975	975	1238	1238	1238	1238	1238	1238	1238	1517	1517	1800	1800
21	2.11	Portugal	342	354	546	588	717	780	1377	1634	1987	2210	2210	2244	2244
23	2.12	Sweden	526	551	574	574	602	602	602	672	672	672	756	756	756
24	2.13	Poland	93	101	114	132	141	282	143	152	153	153	155	155	155
30	2.14	Norway	471	607	738	738	808	868	868	868	868	868	868	1025	1025
31	2.15	Finland	189	189	189	189	193	196	196	204	207	208	210	211	211
34	2.16	Belgium	126	126	126	126	126	126	126	126	126	126	126	126	126
41	2.17	Greece	730	730	1002	1002	1002	1424	1424	1424	1424	1631	1631	1839	1839
43	2.18	Russia	41	55	55										
47	2.19	Iceland	51	54	72	101	112	118	135	135	152	152	152	152	165
50	2.2	Romania	178	194	216	225	230	238	256	269	273	284	294	296	305
53	2.21	Czech Republic	116	135	162	182	182	201	201	209	217	237	237	243	243
54	2.22	Slovakia	58	73	78	81	92	96	96	99	103	108	113	117	117
60	2.23	Cyprus	297	297	297	297	297	297	297	297	297	297	297	297	297
61	2.24	Estonia	42	44	50	50	55	56	56	57	57	57	59	61	61
62	2.25	Hungary	99	102	115	122	126	133	133	145	149	149	151	151	151
64	2.26	Bulgaria	36	36	40	40	49	51	51	57	57	61	63	63	63
69	2.27	Luxembourg	61	61	87	87	87	113	118	118	129	129	130	130	144
75	2.28	Ukraine	1	1	1										
87	2.29	Isle of Man	11	11	11										
88	2.30	Jersey	37	37	55										
95	2.31	Slovenia	136	150	174	177	188	196	201	203	209	210	210	210	217
105	2.32	Latvia	19	19	19	19	21	23	23	23	23	23	23	26	27
106	2.33	Montenegro	18	18	18										
109	2.34	Serbia	115	120	120										
111	2.35	Guernsey	18	18	18										
112	2.36	Lithuania	22	24	29	29	35	40	40	40	47	47	48	48	48
115	2.37	Monaco	1	1	1										
123	2.38	Malta	157	168	176	176	199	204	204	231	237	237	246	257	270
124	2.39	Bosnia and Herzegovina	2	10	10										
129	2.40	(North Macedonia) Macedonia	21	27	29										
133	2.41	Croatia	55	61	69										
152	2.42	Georgia	6	12	13										
154	2.43	Albania	3	13	13										
161	2.44	Andorra	1	1	1										
162	2.45	Kosovo	1	1	2										
163	2.46	Azerbaijan	2	2	2										
164	2.47	Moldova	1	2	2										
166	2.48	(United Kingdom) Cyprus UK bases	30	30	30										
173	2.49	Liechtenstein			5	5	13	13	5	5	5	5	5	5	5
6	3.01	Israel	1719	1719	2000										
12	3.02	China	6628	7126	7931										
15	3.03	Korea, Republic of	1466	1550	1754										
26	3.04	Japan	5022	5022	5022										
32	3.05	Thailand	8879	10043	10043										
38	3.06	India	551	574	615										
37	3.07	Malaysia	1446	1476	1780										
39	3.08	Turkey	199	199	199										
42	3.09	Philippines	3207	3207	3207										
44	3.1	Taiwan	1280	1280	1280										
45	3.11	Kuwait	203	294	498										
48	3.12	Bahrain	123	130	148										
49	3.13	Singapore	1217	1217	1217										
63	3.14	Viet Nam	971	995	1115										
66	3.15	Lebanon	210	210	210										
70	3.16	Saudi Arabia	595	595	595										
74	3.17	United Arab Emirates	110	125	125										
76	3.18	(Palestine) West Bank and Gaza Strip	104	81	81										
78	3.19	Qatar	43	43	43										
79	3.20	Jordan	79	79	99										
86	3.21	Sri Lanka	55	60	60										
89	3.22	Yemen	11	11	13										
91	3.23	Oman	123	125	125										
92	3.24	Laos	51	156	156										
93	3.25	Papua New Guinea	1	1	5										
96	3.26	Bangladesh	30	32	32										
97	3.27	Brunei	786	786	850										
107	3.28	Cambodia	17	21	24										
110	3.29	Indonesia	561	662	691										
112	3.30	Iran	105	124	144										
113	3.31	Iraq	58	58	67										
116	3.32	Nepal	17	17	17										
120	3.33	Myanmar	10	13	15										
134	3.34	Syria	5	9	16										
137	3.35	Afghanistan	32	32	32										
156	3.36	Bhutan	2	3	3										
157	3.37	Maldives	1	1	1										
158	3.38	Kazakhstan	14	15	17										
168	3.39	Pakistan	1	1	1										
5	4.01	New Zealand	2855	2893	2935										
29	4.02	Australia	22109	24114	24949										
82	4.03	French Polynesia	16	16	16										
85	4.04	Samoa	37	37	100										
98	4.05	Fiji	97	97	97										
108	4.06	Vanuatu	3	3	3										
118	4.07	New Caledonia	112	112	112										
125	4.08	Palau	1	1	13										
135	4.09	Cook Islands	1	1	18										
142	4.10	Guam	1	1	1										
144	4.11	Tonga	9	9	9										
153	4.12	Solomon Islands	2	3	3										
155	4.13	Federated States of Micronesia	1	1	1										
171	4.14	Marshall Islands			27										
172	4.15	Nauru			7										
174	4.16	Kiribati			3										
20	5.01	Colombia	270	275	275										
25	5.02	Brazil	1958	2959	2959										
28	5.03	Argentina	3056	4895	5710										
35	5.04	Ecuador	696	696	881										
36	5.05	Peru	4104	4889	5304										
40	5.06	Chile	11860	11860	12030										
51	5.07	Uruguay	550	550	550										
55	5.08	Paraguay	223	223	244										
56	5.09	Bolivia	946	969	973										
58	5.1	Venezuela	454	476	476										
90	5.11	Suriname	14	14	18										
130	5.12	Guyana	5	6	8										
146	5.13	French Guiana	9	9	9										
169	5.14	Falkland Islands		5	5										
65	6.01	Egypt	283	289	314										
77	6.02	Morocco	66	71	75										
94	6.03	South Africa	480	700	700										
99	6.04	Algeria	16	16	19										
100	6.05	Cape Verde	6	6	6										
102	6.06	Côte d'Ivoire	2	2	2										
103	6.07	Tunisia	10	10	19										
104	6.08	Ethiopia	4	4	4										
117	6.09	Mauritius	2	2	6										
121	6.10	Kenya	26	26	26										
126	6.11	Uganda	9	9	9										
136	6.12	Libya	9	9	9										
138	6.13	Réunion	26	26	26										
139	6.14	Seychelles	3	3	3										
140	6.15	Tanzania	8	10	10										
145	6.16	Botswana	13	23	23										
150	6.17	Sudan	2	2	2										
151	6.18	Namibia	4	5	7										
159	6.19	Swaziland	2	2	2										
165	6.20	Gabon	1	1	1										
175	6.21	Ghana			2										

== Deaths ==
Swine flu deaths, August 2009
By date	By cont.	Country or territory	3	5	7	10	12	14	17	19	21	24	26	28	31
0	0	World	1265	1444	1569	1717	1882	2004	2107	2349	2430	2572	2627	2873	3014
0	0	Countries	45	48	48	54	54	55	57	60	62	64	65	66	68
1	1.01	Mexico	146	146	149	149	162	163	163	164	164	170	179	179	184
2	1.02	USA	353	353	353	436	436	436	477	477	477	522	522	522	556
3	1.03	Canada	59	62	64	64	66	66	66	67	71	71	71	72	72
4	1.04	Costa Rica	22	25	25	27	28	28	29	29	31	31	31	31	33
6	1.05	Dominican Republic	5	5	5	5	5	5	5	5	5	5	5	5	8
8	1.06	Guatemala	10	10	10	10	10	10	10	10	10	10	10	12	12
13	1.07	Honduras	4	6	6	6	6	6	7	7	7	7	7	7	8
21	1.08	El Salvador	9	12	12	12	12	12	12	12	15	15	15	17	17
22	1.09	Jamaica	3	3	4	4	4	4	4	4	4	4	4	4	4
30	1.10	Panama	2	2	2	2	2	4	4	6	6	6	6	6	7
37	1.11	Cayman Islands	1	1	1	1	1	1	1	1	1	1	1	1	1
38	1.12	Saint Kitts and Nevis	1	1	1	1	1	1	1	1	1	1	1	1	1
55	1.13	Nicaragua						1	1	1	1	1	2	4	4
5	2.01	Chile	87	96	97	97	97	105	112	112	128	128	128	128	130
7	2.02	Colombia	17	17	17	17	17	18	18	23	23	23	29	29	29
9	2.03	Argentina	165	243	337	338	338	404	404	404	404	439	439	439	465
15	2.04	Brazil	56	96	96	96	192	192	192	368	368	368	368	557	557
16	2.05	Uruguay	22	22	22	22	22	22	22	22	22	22	22	22	22
19	2.06	Paraguay	19	19	22	27	27	27	39	39	39	41	41	41	41
20	2.07	Peru	30	33	36	40	45	45	45	62	62	62	80	80	80
24	2.08	Ecuador	18	19	19	21	21	21	23	23	23	27	27	27	40
25	2.09	Bolivia	9	11	12	12	13	14	14	16	19	19	19	19	19
27	2.10	Venezuela	2	2	2	2	2	12	12	12	17	17	17	17	24
10	3.01	UK	30	30	30	40	40	44	44	44	59	59	59	65	65
17	3.02	Spain	7	8	8	8	10	10	11	12	12	16	16	20	21
33	3.03	Hungary	1	1	1	1	1	1	1	1	1	1	1	1	1
40	3.04	Belgium	1	1	1	1	1	1	1	1	1	1	1	1	1
41	3.05	France	1	1	1	1	1	1	1	1	1	10	10	10	10
46	3.06	Netherlands		1	1	1	1	1	1	1	2	2	2	2	2
50	3.07	Ireland				1	1	1	1	2	2	2	2	2	2
58	3.08	Malta								1	1	1	1	1	1
64	3.09	Greece										1	1	1	1
11	4.01	Australia	67	74	85	92	100	102	112	121	131	132	132	150	150
18	4.02	New Zealand	14	14	14	14	14	14	14	15	15	16	16	16	17
31	4.03	Tonga	1	1	1	1	1	1	1	1	1	1	1	1	1
49	4.04	Samoa				2	2	2	2	2	2	2	2	2	2
59	4.05	Cook Islands								1	1	1	1	1	1
67	4.06	Marshall Islands													1
12	5.01	Philippines	8	8	8	8	8	8	8	8	8	8	8	8	8
14	5.02	Thailand	65	81	81	81	97	97	97	111	111	111	119	119	119
23	5.03	Brunei	1	1	1	1	1	1	1	1	1	1	1	1	1
26	5.04	China	3	3	3	3	4	4	4	4	4	4	4	4	6
28	5.05	Singapore	6	6	8	9	10	11	11	11	11	12	13	13	15
32	5.06	Laos	1	1	1	1	1	1	1	1	1	1	1	1	1
34	5.07	Indonesia	1	3	3	3	3	3	4	4	4	5	5	5	8
35	5.08	Malaysia	7	11	14	32	44	56	64	67	68	69	69	71	72
36	5.09	Saudi Arabia	4	6	7	8	9	11	14	14	16	16	16	16	19
39	5.10	Israel	2	2	2	5	5	7	8	10	11	11	11	14	15
43	5.11	Taiwan	1	1	1	1	1	1	2	2	3	5	5	5	5
44	5.12	Qatar	1	1	1	1	1	1	1	1	1	1	1	1	1
45	5.13	Lebanon	1	1	1	1	1	1	1	1	1	1	1	1	1
47	5.14	India		1	1	4	9	17	25	25	36	60	64	78	93
48	5.15	Vietnam		1	1	1	1	2	2	2	2	2	2	2	2
51	5.16	Iraq				1	1	1	1	1	1	1	1	1	1
52	5.17	Mauritius				1	1	1	1	3	5	5	5	5	5
53	5.18	(Palestine) West Bank and Gaza Strip				1	1	1	1	1	1	1	1	1	1
56	5.19	South Korea							2	2	2	2	2	3	3
57	5.20	Japan							1	3	3	3	3	3	3
60	5.21	Yemen								1	1	1	1	1	1
61	5.22	Kuwait									1	2	2	2	5
62	5.23	United Arab Emirates									1	1	1	1	2
63	5.24	Oman										4	4	5	6
65	5.25	Iran											1	1	1
66	5.26	Syria												1	2
68	5.27	Bahrain													1
29	6.01	Egypt	1	1	1	1	1	1	1	1	1	1	1	1	1
42	6.02	South Africa	1	1	1	2	3	3	6	6	8	8	15	15	25
54	6.03	Ghana				1	1	1	1	1	1	1	1	1	1
