= 2009 flu pandemic table April 2009 =

This is a table containing the figures from the WHO Influenza A Situation Updates issued in April 2009 roughly once a day. Where more than one update was issued in a day, the figures are from the last update that day. The table can by sorted by country, date of first confirmed case or date of first confirmed case by continent.

This presentation of the data in these and other tables shows the progression, peaks, and, eventually, decline of the epidemic in each country and continent.

Previous month | Next month

== Chart ==
WHO figures chart of progression

== Confirmed cases ==
Swine flu cases, April 2009
By date	By cont.	Country	24	26	27	28	29	30
0	0	World	25	38	73	105	148	257
0	0	Days to double (approx)			2	2	2	2
0	0	Countries	2	2	4	7	9	11
1	1.01	Mexico	18	18	26	26	26	97
2	1.02	United States of America	7	20	40	64	91	109
3	1.03	Canada			6	6	13	19
4	2.01	Spain			1	2	4	13
7	2.02	United Kingdom				2	5	8
9	2.03	Austria					1	1
8	2.04	Germany					3	3
10	2.05	Netherlands						1
11	2.06	Switzerland						1
6	3.01	Israel				2	2	2
5	4.01	New Zealand				3	3	3

== Deaths ==
Swine flu deaths, April 2009
By date	By cont.	Country	27	30
0	0	World	6	8
0	0	Countries	1	2
1	1.01	Mexico	6	7
2	1.02	United States of America		1

== Maps ==
29 April 2009 Deaths Confirmed cases Suspected cases No cases

30 April 2009 Deaths Confirmed cases Suspected cases No cases
