= 2009 flu pandemic table May 2009 =

This is a table containing the figures from the WHO Influenza A Situation Updates issued in May 2009 roughly once a day. Where more than one update was issued in a day, the corresponding figures are from the last update that day. The table can by sorted by country, date of first confirmed case or date of first confirmed case by continent.

This presentation of the data in this and other tables shows the progression, peaks, and, eventually, decline of the epidemic in each country and continent.

Previous month | Next month

== Chart ==
WHO figures chart of progression

== Confirmed cases ==
Swine flu cases, May 2009
By date	By cont.	Country	1	2	3	4	5	6	7	8	9	10	11	12	13	14	15	16	17	18	19	20	21	22	23	25	26	27	29
0	0	World	367	658	898	1085	1490	1894	2371	2500	3440	4379	4694	5251	5728	6397	7520	8451	8480	8829	9830	10243	11034	11168	12021	12514	12950	13394	15501
0	0	Days to double (approx)	2	2	2	3	3	3	3	4	4	4	5	4	5	6	6	7	8	8	8	9	9	10	10	12	12	13	14
0	0	Countries	13	16	18	21	21	23	24	25	29	29	30	30	33	33	34	36	39	40	40	41	41	42	44	47	47	49	54
1	1.01	Mexico	156	397	506	590	822	942	1112	1204	1364	1626	1626	2059	2059	2446	2446	2895	2895	3103	3648	3648	3892	3892	3892	4174	4174	4541	4910
2	1.02	United States of America	141	160	226	286	403	642	896	896	1639	2254	2532	2600	3009	3352	4298	4714	4714	4714	5123	5469	5710	5764	6552	6552	6764	6764	7927
3	1.03	Canada	34	51	85	101	140	165	201	214	242	280	284	330	358	289	449	496	496	496	496	496	719	719	719	805	921	921	1118
16	1.04	Costa Rica		1	1	1	1	1	1	1	1	8	8	8	8	8	8	9	9	9	9	9	20	20	20	28	33	33	33
19	1.05	El Salvador				2	2	2	2	2	2	2	4	4	4	4	4	4	4	4	6	6	6	6	6	6	6	11	11
22	1.06	Guatemala						1	1	1	1	1	1	1	3	3	3	3	3	3	3	3	4	4	4	4	4	5	5
27	1.07	Panama									2	3	15	16	29	29	40	43	54	54	59	65	69	73	76	76	76	76	107
33	1.08	Cuba													1	1	3	3	3	3	3	3	4	4	4	4	4	4	4
46	1.09	Honduras																								1	1	1	1
52	1.1	Dominican Republic																											2
4	2.01	Spain	13	13	40	54	57	73	81	88	88	93	95	95	98	100	100	100	103	103	103	107	111	113	126	133	136	138	143
7	2.02	United Kingdom	8	15	15	18	27	28	32	34	34	39	47	55	68	71	71	78	82	101	102	102	109	112	117	122	137	137	203
9	2.03	Austria	1	1	1	1	1	1	1	1	1	1	1	1	1	1	1	1	1	1	1	1	1	1	1	1	1	1	1
8	2.04	Germany	4	6	8	8	9	9	10	11	11	11	11	12	12	12	12	14	14	14	14	14	14	14	17	17	17	17	19
10	2.05	Netherlands	1	1	1	1	1	1	2	3	3	3	3	3	3	3	3	3	3	3	3	3	3	3	3	3	3	3	3
11	2.06	Switzerland	1	1	1	1	1	1	1	1	1	1	1	1	1	1	1	1	1	1	1	1	1	1	2	3	3	3	4
13	2.07	Denmark	1	1	1	1	1	1	1	1	1	1	1	1	1	1	1	1	1	1	1	1	1	1	1	1	1	1	1
14	2.08	France		2	2	4	4	5	5	12	12	12	13	13	13	14	14	14	14	14	14	15	16	16	16	16	16	16	21
17	2.09	(Republic of Ireland) Ireland			1	1	1	1	1	1	1	1	1	1	1	1	1	1	1	1	1	1	1	1	1	1	1	1	3
18	2.1	Italy			1	2	5	5	5	6	6	9	9	9	9	9	9	9	9	9	9	9	10	10	14	19	19	23	26
21	2.11	Portugal				1	1	1	1	1	1	1	1	1	1	1	1	1	1	1	1	1	1	1	1	1	1	1	1
23	2.12	Sweden						1	1	1	1	1	2	2	2	2	2	2	3	3	3	3	3	3	3	3	3	3	4
24	2.13	Poland							1	1	1	1	1	1	1	1	1	1	1	1	1	2	2	2	2	3	3	3	4
30	2.14	Norway											2	2	2	2	2	2	2	2	2	2	3	3	4	4	4	4	4
31	2.15	Finland													2	2	2	2	2	2	2	2	2	2	2	2	2	2	3
34	2.16	Belgium															1	2	4	5	5	5	5	5	7	7	7	7	8
41	2.17	Greece																				1	1	1	1	1	1	1	3
43	2.18	Russia																							1	1	2	2	2
47	2.19	Iceland																								1	1	1	1
50	2.2	Romania																											3
53	2.21	Czech Republic																											1
54	2.22	Slovakia																											1
6	3.01	Israel	2	3	3	4	4	4	6	7	7	7	7	7	7	7	7	7	7	7	7	7	7	7	7	8	8	9	11
12	3.02	China	1	1	1	1	1	1	1	1	1	1	2	2	3	4	4	4	5	6	7	7	8	11	11	15	20	22	30
15	3.03	(South Korea) Korea, Republic of		1	1	1	2	2	3	3	3	3	3	3	3	3	3	3	3	3	3	3	3	3	3	3	21	21	33
26	3.04	Japan									3	4	4	4	4	4	4	4	7	125	159	210	259	294	321	345	350	360	364
32	3.05	Thailand													2	2	2	2	2	2	2	2	2	2	2	2	2	2	2
38	3.06	India																	1	1	1	1	1	1	1	1	1	1	1
37	3.07	Malaysia																	2	2	2	2	2	2	2	2	2	2	2
39	3.08	Turkey																	1	2	2	2	2	2	2	2	2	2	2
42	3.09	Philippines																						1	1	1	2	2	6
44	3.10	Taiwan																							1	1	4	4	4
45	3.11	Kuwait																								18	18	18	18
48	3.12	Bahrain																										1	1
49	3.13	Singapore																										1	4
5	4.01	New Zealand	4	4	4	6	6	6	5	5	5	7	7	7	7	7	7	9	9	9	9	9	9	9	9	9	9	9	9
29	4.02	Australia									1	1	1	1	1	1	1	1	1	1	1	1	3	7	12	16	19	39	147
20	5.01	Colombia				1	1	1	1	1	1	1	3	3	6	7	10	11	11	11	11	12	12	12	12	13	16	16	17
25	5.02	Brazil								4	6	6	8	8	8	8	8	8	8	8	8	9	9	9	10	10	10	11	15
28	5.03	Argentina									1	1	1	1	1	1	1	1	1	1	1	1	1	1	1	2	5	19	37
35	5.04	Ecuador																1	1	1	1	1	1	8	8	10	24	28	32
36	5.05	Peru																1	1	1	2	3	3	5	5	25	27	27	31
40	5.06	Chile																		1	4	5	5	24	24	44	74	86	165
51	5.07	Uruguay																											2

== Deaths ==
Swine flu deaths, May 2009
By date	By cont.	Country	1	2	3	5	6	8	9	10	11	13	15	17	18	19	20	21	22	25	26	27	29
0	0	World	10	17	20	26	31	46	48	49	53	61	65	72	74	79	80	85	86	91	92	95	99
0	0	Countries	2	2	2	2	2	2	3	4	4	4	4	4	4	4	4	4	4	4	4	4	4
1	1.01	Mexico	9	16	19	25	29	44	45	45	48	56	60	66	68	72	72	75	75	80	80	83	85
2	1.02	United States of America	1	1	1	1	2	2	2	2	3	3	3	4	4	5	6	8	9	9	10	10	11
3	1.03	Canada							1	1	1	1	1	1	1	1	1	1	1	1	1	1	2
4	1.04	Costa Rica								1	1	1	1	1	1	1	1	1	1	1	1	1	1
