= BTSB anti-D scandal =

Hepatitis contamination of human plasma derivative

In 1994, the Irish Blood Transfusion Service Board (BTSB) informed the Minister for Health that a blood product they had distributed in 1977 for the treatment of pregnant mothers had been contaminated with the hepatitis C virus. Following a report by an expert group, it was discovered that the BTSB had produced and distributed a second infected batch in 1991. The Government established a Tribunal of Inquiry to establish the facts of the case and also agreed to establish a tribunal for the compensation of victims but seemed to frustrate and delay the applications of these, in some cases terminally, ill women.

This controversy also sparked an examination of the BTSB's lax procedures for screening blood products for the treatment of haemophilia and exposed the infection of many haemophiliacs with HIV, hepatitis B and hepatitis C.

== Background ==
The Blood Transfusion Service Board (BTSB) has responsibility for the production and supply of human blood products used for the treatment of various blood-related conditions. In 1970, it began production of anti-D human immunoglobulin for the treatment of rhesus negative (blood type) mothers who, having previously given birth to rhesus positive babies, could have anti-bodies that would cause haemolytic disease (HDFN) in the foetus of future pregnancies. If, following a neo-natal blood test, the rhesus (Rh) factor of the infant is found to be incompatible with that of the mother, an anti-D injection can be given to the mother to protect her future pregnancies. If the mother were to develop her own rhesus anti-bodies, she would be required to undergo a course of plasma exchange transfusion throughout her pregnancy to reduce the level of rhesus antibodies in her blood.

In 1970 the BTSB began manufacturing anti-D human immunoglobulin for intravenous application at its Dublin laboratory using a process developed in 1967 by Professor Hans-Hermann Hoppe of Hamburg's Central Institute for Transfusionmedicine, one of the founders of the German transfusion service, StKB. The process involved the use of ion-exchange chromatography together with an ethanol precipitation, which was thought at the time to inactivate viruses that might be present in donated blood, thereby removing them from the plasma eventually fractionated in the process. In 1972 Professor Hoppe notified the BTSB that he had refined his process to include a plasma quarantine period and ultrafiltration (instead of ethanol precipitation) but the BTSB continued to use his 1967 process. By 1975 it was known that hepatitis was a blood-born disease and that multiple types of hepatitis virus were in circulation. Tests were available to identify the hepatitis A and hepatitis B viruses and although it was suspected that another strain of the virus was responsible for Jaundice in patients whose blood did not test positive for either type, there was no diagnostic test for hepatitis C until 1990.

== The 1977 contamination ==
In 1976 a pregnant woman (referred to as "Patient X" in the report of the Finlay Tribunal) was a patient of Dr. McGuinness, assistant master of the Coombe Maternity Hospital. Having had several pregnancies severely affected by haemolytic disease, Patient X was prescribed a therapeutic course of plasma exchange over a 25-week period, to reduce the antibodies that would damage her foetus. The obstetric consultant suggested to one of the BTSB staff that they could off-set the cost of Patient X's treatment by using the plasma extracted from her (which had high concentrations of anti-D) to manufacture anti-D immunoglobulin. Patient X was never asked to consent to her plasma being used in this way.

Her treatment began in September 1976 and plasma from her first two treatments was mixed with that from other donors in 5 batches of anti-D produced by the BTSB and distributed between January and April 1977. On 4 November 1976, Patient X had a reaction to her plasma exchange and her treatment was suspended temporarily. On 17 November the Coombe Hospital notified the BTSB that Patient X had become jaundiced and was diagnosed as having hepatitis.

Dr. McGuinness requested that a sample of her blood be tested for hepatitis B and sent a second sample to the Middlesex Hospital in London. These tests reported negative for hepatitis B (hepatitis C was not recognized not to mention testable at this time.) As Patient X's plasma exchange treatments continued, regular blood samples were sent to the BTSB to monitor the level of rhesus anti-bodies in her blood, each sample labelled "infective hepatitis". Despite all senior medical staff at the BTSB being aware of this infection, they continued to take plasma donations from Patient X throughout January 1977 and include these in the pools used to make 16 batches of anti-D which were distributed to maternity hospitals for administration. The number of doses in each batch could vary from 250 to 400 injections.

In July 1977, the BTSB received a report from the Rotunda Hospital that 3 mothers who had received injections from anti-D batch 238 had subsequently developed hepatitis. On 25 July, the chief biochemist of the BTSB laboratory was instructed to exclude Patient X's plasma from all pools used to manufacture anti-D. She did precisely this but did not, however, consider disposal or recall of existing batches in which Patient X's plasma had already been used and continued to distribute these to hospitals.

Samples from the 16 batches of anti-D that included Patient X's plasma and samples from the 3 Rotunda patients were sent to the Middlesex Hospital for testing, which again were inconclusive as no test for hepatitis C existed. The Scientific Committee of the BTSB began to compile a list of the destinations to which doses from anti-D batch 238 had been sent. It is unclear however, if this was completed or used in any recall operation. Between August and December 1977, the BTSB received notifications of similar cases from the maternity hospitals at the Coombe and Holles Street in Dublin indicating contamination amongst two other batches of anti-D. Despite continued notifications of hepatitis cases in 1977 and 1978, the BTSB issued no national recall of its anti-D product.

=== Subsequent testing of 1977 samples ===
By 1990 scientists had developed multiple diagnostic test mechanisms for hepatitis C:

- ELISA: HCV antibody enzyme immunoassay detects specific antibodies the body creates against HCV
- RIBA: Recombinant ImmunoBlot Assay (aka Western blot test) detects specific proteins associated with HCV
- PCR: HCV Polymerase Chain Reaction detects RNA of the specific virus

HCV RNA can be detected by PCR typically one to two weeks after infection, while antibodies can take substantially longer to form and be detected. Screening a population usually relies on a combination of all three test types.

With the development of a diagnostic test for hepatitis C in 1990, Dr Jeremy Garson of the Middlesex Hospital conducted retrospective testing on the many non-A, non-B hepatitis (NANBH) samples it had retained over many years. On 16 December 1991, the Middlesex Hospital FAXed a letter to the BTSB in Dublin to inform them that retained samples from Patient X and the 1977 batches of anti-D had tested positive for hepatitis C. Attached to his letter, Dr. Garson provided a list of questions that would need to be answered to determine the causes and extent of infection caused in 1977. The BTSB replied to this letter suggesting the questions be discussed at a meeting in London. The meeting never happened and the BTSB seems to have taken no further action in respect of this letter.

When check-back of the Patient X's case commenced in 1992, 8 of the 16 batches made from the BTSB's plasma pools in from January to July 1977 were shown to be contaminated with hepatitis C. These included batch 250 from which Brigid McCole received her anti-D injection on 5 November 1977.

== The 1989 contamination ==
In August 1989 a pregnant woman (referred to as "Donor Y" in the report of the Finlay Tribunal) began a course of plasma exchange transfusions at St. James's Hospital in Dublin. In the first month of her treatment 10 donations of plasma were taken from her, all of which were clear of hepatitis C when subsequently tested in 1992.

On 13 September 1989 "Donor Y" received a unit of plasma from the BTSB which was almost certainly contaminated with hepatitis C. (Check back tests of her plasma donations after this date tested positive for hepatitis C, a sub-type different from the one that infected Patient X.) With the emergence of HIV in the 1980s and the BTSB's previous difficulties with hepatitis contamination, the BTSB now had a precautionary protocol surrounding plasma donations by mothers undergoing exchange transfusions: Plasma donations from such women could not be included in the production of blood products until they had given birth and had a blood test showing they were clear of HIV, hepatitis B and hepatitis C.

All of the plasma donated by Donor Y, therefore was frozen and stored subject to clearance for anti-D production. In September and 12 October more donations of plasma were taken from Donor Y and placed in storage. Throughout 1990, the laboratory staff of the BTSB requested the blood test clearance of Donor Y from the BTSB medical staff responsible for her case.

Despite receiving no test results, in January 1991 the BTSB lab began to include Donor Y's plasma in the plasma pools used to manufacture 46 batches of anti-D.

In November 1991, Donor Y was tested for HIV, hepatitis B and hepatitis C (for which a new test was available) and was found negative for all three. (It is assumed that by this point she had "sero converted" for hepatitis C, having produced sufficient antibodies to eliminate it from her blood stream.) The 4 batches of anti-D suspected of infecting women at the various Dublin maternity hospitals (and which included plasma taken from Donor Y in 1989) tested positive for hepatitis C.

It was not clearly established whether or not the BTSB laboratory chief was notified of these tests but she continued to manufacture and distribute 21 batches using Donor Y's plasma. Upon subsequent check-back of all 46 anti-D batches produced from the pools containing Donor Y's plasma, 20 batches were found to be positive for Hep-C, 3 were negative and in the remaining 23 "infectivity could not be ruled out".

== 1994 discovery of HCV contamination ==
After the hepatitis C virus (HCV) was identified in 1988 and a diagnostic test developed in 1990, in 1991 the BTSB added this test to its screening of all blood donors (along with HIV and hepatitis B). The BTSB's regional director for Munster set up a survey of all donors in the region who tested positive for HCV, with a view to tracing the source of infection.

She began to notice very soon that almost all positive cases were females and fell across a relatively narrow age range. As a result of this survey, by 1994 she had identified a possible link between infected donors and the anti-D injections they had received many years previously. She made an interim report in this survey at a meeting of the BTSB Medical Consultants Group on 19 January 1994. It was decided to perform a similar study of HCV infection outside the Munster region.

Samples from the Munster donors who had tested positive for HCV were sent to the Middlesex Hospital and compared with samples from Patient X. The results suggested "a strong causative relationship" between them and the 1977 hepatitis infections. It was decided to send samples of the BTSB's current stocks of anti-D to Middlesex for testing. These still contained some batches in which Donor Y's plasma had been used. The results indicated some contamination with HCV but of a different sub-type from that found in 1977 samples.

Throughout February 1994, the board of the BTSB held several crisis meetings and on 17 February 1994, the informed the Minister for Health, Brendan Howlin T.D. of the discovery. The BTSB and met with Department of Health officials to discuss a plan of action. Following meetings between the BTSB and officials at the Department of Health the following measures were agreed:

1. A press release to be made on 21 February
2. The institution of a HCV National Screening Program for all recipients of anti-D injections since 1970
3. A total recall of all BTSB-produced anti-D product
4. Sourcing a replacement stock of anti-D from Canada

On the advice of Department of Health officials the BTSB press release on 21 February made no mention of the second contamination of anti-D in 1991.

On 22 February 1994, the Minister for Health made a Statement in Dáil Éireann about the issue, which had already been reported in the press. He commended the BTSB for their thorough research, assured the public that only virally inactive anti-D would now be distributed and announced some aspects of the National Screening Programme.

The BTSB's protocol for recall of its products consisted of the sending of a notification letter to each maternity hospital or GP that had been supplied with anti-D and a follow up phone call two weeks later. As the BTSB records were not up-to-date and letters were addressed to named individuals some of whom were no longer working, some of the hospitals did not receive notification and continued to dispense their stock of infected anti-D in 1994.

In order to have an immediate replacement stock of anti-D following the recall of its own product, the BTSB quickly sourced WinRho SDF from the Winnipeg Rh Institute Manitoba, Canada without first getting the product approved by the National Drug Advisory Board (NDAB).

== Primary, secondary and occult infections ==
The BTSB launched its HCV National Screening Programme and set about trying to identify and contact all women who had received anti-D injections since it had begun issuing it in 1970. It did so by checking its own records and contacting Hospitals and GPs to whom infected doses has been sent and by publishing adverts in the national media appealing for women to come forward. By February 1997, 62,667 women had been tested for evidence of HCV infection. Almost 1,200 tested positive for HCV antibodies.

Of the samples from women who had received anti-D manufactured in 1977, 704 showed signs of current or past infection. Another 53 showed a RIBA reaction but in which antibodies could not be confirmed and a further 74 showed no signs of infection or antibodies but had recovered from an episode of hepatitis in the past.

Of the samples from women who had received anti-D manufactured in 1991, 72 showed signs of current or past infection. Another 26 showed a RIBA reaction but antibodies could not be confirmed. The BTSB noted that the number of women that came forward for testing from the cohort that received anti-D in 1991 was 30% lower than expected.

Because HCV is a blood-borne virus it is relatively difficult to transmit. However, the risk of transmission is greater where exposure to or exchange of blood is a factor. The risk to sexual partners is much lower. The screening programme identified 11 individuals who had been infected with HCV through their contact with/treatment of anti-D recipients.

The greatest risk of secondary infection to the population as a whole would be from infected people donating blood to the BTSB. Because the rhesus negative factor is relatively rare, people with that factor are encouraged to donate blood. Of the infected anti-D recipients, 103 went on to donate blood to the BTSB following their infection. These donors made total of 504 donations which resulted in an estimated 606 potentially infectious labile blood components (Another donor was identified who had been indirectly infected by an anti-D recipient and whose donations went into 8 labile blood components.) As many blood products are administered to patients with critical health issues, the level of mortality amongst all blood product recipients is relatively high. Upon tracing the recipients of the blood products potentially infected by anti-D recipients, the BTSB found that many were deceased but of 61 living recipients, 30 tested positive for on-going infection with HCV.

The development of ultra-sensitive HCV tests since the 1990s has made it possible to detect markers for the disease in people who seem to be fully recovered from hepatitis. It is accepted, however, that there may still be a level of "occult infection" in otherwise healthy populations.

The screening programme also examined the partners and children of anti-D recipients. As of 17 January 1995, the BTSB reported that 1,265 children and 363 partners have been screened for hepatitis C. Up to that date, ten children had tested positive for hepatitis C antibodies and two of these children have tested positive for the virus. Three partners have tested positive for hepatitis C antibodies. Further investigations were underway in these cases.

== Impact of HCV infection on the victims ==
Many of the women who tested positive for HCV experienced relief as the seemingly inexplicable symptoms they had suffered over many years could now be explained. However, they suddenly came to feel stigmatized and discriminated against by various members of society. There was a general confusion between HCV and HIV which were often mentioned together in communications about intravenous drug use. For a long time it was unclear whether women could infect their husbands with HCV through sexual intercourse or whether they might have infected their children in utero, which led to stress and tensions in families. Many of the women were refused treatment by dentists, had their employment terminated and were refused insurance.

The state's largest health insurance company, the Voluntary Health Insurance (VHI) refused cover to several women on the grounds that they had acquired a "sexually transmitted disease". Some began to feel a deep sense of betrayal as they had contracted this virus and disease through no fault their own but through an agency of the state. Chronic hepatitis C infection when left untreated not only results in cirrhosis of the liver but can trigger other diseases not directly associated with the liver (cancers, hypertension, Heart arrhythmia ) and auto-immune conditions (rheumatoid arthritis), which may not be easily attributed to the HCV infection.

The Department of Health established Hepatology Units in Beaumont, the Mater, St. James's and St.Vincent's Hospitals in Dublin, Cork University Hospital, University Hospital Galway and later in St. Luke's Hospital Kilkenny and Crumlin Children's Hospital, where those infected were referred for medical supervision and treatment. A counseling service was also provided for the infected women although this soon proved unsatisfactory as it was under the auspices of the BTSB. This was augmented with the provision of counselling by Well Woman centres in Dublin and Cork and was subsequently extended to private psychologists in other regions.

In July 2017 the European Association for the Study of the Liver (EASL) published the report of a study conducted jointly by the Health Service Executive-Health Protection Surveillance Centre, Dublin, Ireland, the European Programme for Intervention Epidemiology Training (EPIET) and the European Centre for Disease Prevention and Control (EDCD), Stockholm, Sweden into the disease outcomes for the women infected by the anti-D contamination. Of the 682 women included in the study 72 (19%) developed cirrhosis and 18 had died from liver-related causes (5%) after 36 years of infection. Disease progression accelerated in the last five years of follow-up, particularly in women with diabetes mellitus and high alcohol consumption.

== Victims' support groups ==
=== Positive Action ===
Having tested positive for HCV, the journalist Jane O'Brien made a request to the BTSB to put her in contact with other women in the same situation. They refused her request on grounds of patient confidentiality and privacy. She persisted through word of mouth and appeals in the media to make contact with other women affected and set up a meeting in May 1994 at the offices of the Council for the Status for Women with a view to forming a support group. 25 women who had tested positive for HCV attended and elected a committee for the group. They decided to name the group "Positive Action" which simultaneously stated the purpose of the group and countered the stigma associated with their HCV positive status. The group set up its office at 56 Fitzwilliam Square, Dublin.

The group quickly gathered support from the Council for the Status of Women, Rosemary Daly of the Irish Haemophilia Society, Theresa Ahern TD, Chair of the Oireachtas Women's Rights Committee, Máire Geoghegan-Quinn TD and President Mary Robinson. Dr. Geoff Dusheiko of the Royal Free Hospital London became their expert advisor on medical matters. When the group first published their list of grievances with their treatment and the responses of the BTSB, the Health Minister initially defended the BTSB's response but following pressure in the Dáil from opposition TDs, particularly Theresa Ahern, and Bernard Durkan he agreed to meet first with one of the founders and then in June 1994 with the full support group.

Minister Howlin acknowledged the women's grievances with the BTSB's queries into their sexual history and the fact that they were being counseled by the very organization that was responsible for their infection. The Minister announced that a limited ex-Gratia expenses scheme was being operated by the BTSB to ensure that all anti-D recipients could avail of the screening, counseling and treatment services but that no consideration could be given to a full compensation scheme until the Expert Group on the BTSB had completed and published its report.

Positive Action's repeated requests for the BTSB to distribute their letter to all women affected by the anti-D contamination were ignored until Michael Noonan became Health Minister.

The Fine Gael TD, Mr Alan Shatter, called on the DPP to consider criminal prosecutions of those responsible for what he called the "blood bank scandal".

=== Transfusion Positive ===
The HCV National Screening program revealed many people who had tested positive for hepatitis C but who had never received an anti-D injection. Many of these were men and women who had never had children but who had had at some point in their lives received blood transfusions supplied by the BTSB. These included people who had been in accidents, had surgical operations or were suffering from other illnesses such as haemophilia or kidney disease and need regular blood transfusions, which prior to 1994 had not been screened for hepatitis C (and several other viruses).

Inspired by the actions of the women of Positive Action, a group of men and women met in Liberty Hall on 22 April 1995 with a view to organizing and making representations based on their specific needs and circumstances. They called their group Transfusion Positive and held their first official meeting on 13 May 1995, in Powers Hotel on Kildare Street, Dublin. Unlike the mothers who had received anti-D injections from known infected batches, it was much more difficult to prove categorically the source of infection for those who had had transfusions or had secondary infections from transfusion patients who had been infected.

== Expert Group on the BTSB ==
On 5 March 1994, Minister for Health Brendan Howlin announced the establishment of an Expert Group under the leadership of Miriam Hederman O'Brien, with the following terms of reference:

1. To examine and report to the Minister for Health on the following matters:

(a) All the circumstances surrounding the infection of the anti-D immunoglobulin product manufactured by the Blood Transfusion Service Board;
(b) The systems and standards in place for donor selection, the manufacturing process and use of the anti-D immunoglobulin produced by the Blood Transfusion Service Board.

2. To make recommendations to the Minister for Health on the above matters and on any other matters relation to the Blood Transfusion Service Board which the Group considers necessary.

The other members of the Expert Group were:

- Alistair Bellingham, Professor of Hematology at the King's College School of Medicine and Dentistry, London and President of the Royal College of Pathologists
- Caroline Hussey, lecturer in the Department of Industrial Microbiology, University College, Dublin and Registrar of UCD from October 1994.
- Fergal Lynch, Assistant Principal Officer, Department of Health, Secretary to the Expert Group (assisted by Siobhain Phelan)

The Minister's decision to use an Expert Group rather than a Tribunal of Inquiry was influenced by the public outrage at the costs of the Beef Tribunal which with costs in excess of €27 million was at that time the most expensive inquiry in the history of the state. The Expert Group format should establish the facts and make recommendations in a much quicker and cost-efficient manner. The Expert Group met with and gathered evidence from senior management and technical staff of the BTSB, the NDAB, the department of health and from various medical experts and bodies both in Ireland and abroad. Its remit did not extend to interviewing the infected women or their representatives although it did make some observations on their treatment and counselling.

On 27 January 1995, the Expert Group delivered their report to the new Minister for Health, Michael Noonan T.D. who subsequently had it published.

The report clearly laid out the events that led to the 1977 contamination of anti-D and also those leading to the second contamination in 1991. (It also found that there had been infections with hepatitis during every year that anti-D was used – i.e., 1970–1994.)

The report highlighted operational and procedural shortcomings in the BTSB's response to each case and in its general operations:

- Continuing to harvest plasma from a woman who had "environmental jaundice" contrary to its stated procedures. (It was later revealed that the BTSB had even known that her hepatitis was in fact infectious.)
- Continuing to distribute anti-D that included Patient X's plasma after deciding to exclude her plasma from pools for future production
- Operating different screening protocols for male and female donors of anti-D plasma
- Failing to notify the women infected in 1977 when informed of positive HCV tests by the Middlesex Hospital in 1991
- Failure to explore alternatives to the Canadian WinRho product, which served as the emergency replacement for anti-D but which had not been approved by either the Irish NDAP nor the US FDA
- Continuing to inject the replacement anti-D intravenously, when WinRho was recommended for intramuscular injection only
- Failure to revise its anti-D manufacturing process beyond the one developed in 1967
- Frequently failing to renew its licenses to manufacture blood products

It also noted that while staff of the BTSB had at all times been courteous, they had not always been forthcoming with details:

Some of our queries were answered in a manner which, although accurate, required considerable supplementary probing on our part before we felt reasonably confident that we had adequate information about the circumstances into which we were inquiring. ...

The account which we have given and the inferences which we have drawn are on the basis of the information we have received.

Indeed, some of the information they received would be amended during the course of the subsequent Tribunal of Inquiry. The difficulties the Expert Group had obtaining information from BTSB staff had been reported in the press and were known to Minister Howlin.

In Dáil debates following the publication of the Expert Group's report, during which there were calls for dismissals and resignations at the BTSB, Michael Noonan TD, the new Minister for Health adopted a defensive position, going so far as to express full confidence in the board of the BTSB, 9 of whom had been appointed since 1993.

== Ad-hoc compensation tribunal ==
Following publication of the Expert Group's report Positive Action entered into negotiations with the Department of Health for appropriate compensation (medical and financial). Negotiations ceased in September 1995 and resumed on 1 November 1995 at the request of the Department of Health.

As a result, the following were introduced:

- A healthcare package enacted as an amendment to the Health Act in 1996, which provided for hospital services, GP visits, drugs and medicines, medical and surgical appliances, optical, aural and dental services, home nursing, home support and counselling.
- A non-statutory compensation tribunal

Positive Action criticized the "ad hoc" nature of the proposed tribunal, which meant that any government could take a decision to simply wind it up without a vote in the Dáil. They demanded that any compensation tribunal should be established on a statutory basis by an act of the Oireachtas. They felt that the purpose of the tribunal was to enable the state to never admit its culpability in the case and to force women to accept smaller sums than would be awarded through a judicial process. Positive Action held a meeting in December 1995 at which 91% of members voted to reject and boycott the compensation tribunal.

Transfusion Positive, the group representing people who had contracted hepatitis C through blood transfusions (rather than anti-D) from the BTSB also voiced concerns over the tribunal's requirement to prove infection "on the balance of probabilities".

In December 1995, despite the misgivings of the representative groups, the government announced the establishment of the tribunal to award compensation to those infected with hepatitis C through BTSB products (anti-D and transfusions) under the chairmanship of former Supreme Court judge Mr. Justice Seamus Egan.

The tribunal chairman would adjudicate on cases together with two other members selected from a panel that included Ms. Alison Cross BL, Ms. Sheila Cooney Solicitor and Ms. Eileen Leyden BL.

In February 1996, the tribunal made its first compensation awards to two women whose cases were accelerated due to their terminal illness, one of whom died within weeks of the award.

At the end of February 1996 only 72 women had applied to the compensation tribunal and some 400 had issued writs against the BTSB in the courts.

The government announced that the closing date for applications to the compensation tribunal would be 17 June 1996.

Positive Action re-iterated their rejection of the tribunal claiming the government was using it to discourage women from taking legal action to expose the truth.

Fearing they might miss out on all compensation members of Positive Action group took legal advice. Some members chose to apply to the tribunal while simultaneously initiating legal action against the BTSB.

Throughout the following weeks stories began to emerge of an aggressive legal strategy being pursued by lawyers acting for the Department of Health and opposition politicians accused the government of trying to bully the women into settling with the compensation tribunal.

Over the following months the media reported on various awards made by the compensation tribunal.

By February 1997, the compensation tribunal had received 1,664 applications, of which 1,512 were primary claimants, 86 were dependents and 66 carers. In the 267 cases heard to that point, the tribunal had made 169 lump sum awards, 96 provisional awards and had disallowed two claims.

In subsequent years several of the awards made or denied by the tribunal were challenged in the High Court, most of which were reviewed by Mr. Justice Bernard Barton.

== The McCole case ==
On 28 July 1995, lawyers acting for a HCV-positive Donegal woman with advanced liver disease who had received anti-D treatments during her 12 pregnancies made an application to the High Court to pursue for damages against the BTSB and the Irish State using an assumed name.

It was proposed that to protect the woman and her family from the stigma associated with the hepatitis C, she would take the case using the name "Bridget Roe". Ms. Susan Stapleton, Solicitor said the woman wished to use an alias because she desired to protect her privacy, not merely as a means of preventing embarrassment to her but also to prevent real injustice to her.

In January 1996, the Attorney General challenged the woman's right to take such a case using a false name. On 14 February 1996, Miss Justice Laffoy ruled that to do so would contravene Article 34 (1) of the Constitution.

The woman decided to continue with her case for damages against the BTSB, the NDAB, the Minister for Health, the Attorney General and the Irish State using her real name Brigid Ellen McCole. Given the advanced nature of her disease and poor prognosis, her legal team applied to the High Court to set a date for her action to be heard in June 1996. While adjudicating on the issue on 26 April, Mr Justice Costello, President of the High Court, asked if granting the request would mean 400 similar applications would follow and fixed 8 October as the date for the trial, which was expected to take six weeks .

On 23 April the Oireachtas Select Committee on Social Affairs wrote to the BTSB requesting that it send a delegation to meet the Select Committee on Social Affairs on Thursday 2 May and discuss the hepatitis C issue. The Chief Executive of the BTSB wrote a response saying it would not be appropriate for board could to enter into such discussions while Mrs. McCole's action was pending in the High Court.

In June 1996 Mrs. McCole's legal team applied to the High Court for discovery of files held by the BTSB, which contained information relevant to Mrs. McCole's case. Ms. Justice Laffoy ruled that the woman was entitled to seek information from the board's employees relating to the case dating back to 1976 and gave the BTSB until 19 July to answer certain questions about its documentation. On 23 July Mr Donal O'Donnell SC, for the BTSB, said the BTSB was conducting an extensive search through a great volume of files and asked for an additional two to three weeks more to submit an affidavit concerning the discovery of documents. Miss Justice Laffoy said that it was an awkward situation for the BTSB and that she had no option but to grant its request .

From files eventually disclosed by the BTSB, Mrs. McCole's legal team uncovered significant details that had not been shown to the Expert Group's investigation:

- Notes showing that Patient X had been diagnosed with infectious (not simply environmental) hepatitis
- No evidence that the BTSB had ever got Patient X's consent for her plasma to be harvested for use in anti-D production
- Evidence that Patient X had been clear of hepatitis when her treatment began and had probably been infected by the BTSB's plasma exchange process

Based on these revelations, Mrs. McCole's legal team formulated a long list of questions which it sent to the BTSB and as it became increasingly unlikely that they would ever come to trial, leaked them also to the press .

After attending a family wedding in Donegal in August 1996, Mrs. McCole was transferred to St. Vincent's Hospital in Dublin, where it quickly became clear that she was dying. The legal teams acting for the plaintiffs contacted Mrs. McCole's team to negotiate a settlement. On 20 September they wrote a letter of apology to Mrs. McCole and admitted liability in the case. In a series of letters Counsel for the BTSB offered £175,000 in compensation from the BTSB compensation tribunal provided the McCole family would agree never to sue them following their mother's death .

If Mrs. McCole died without accepting this offer, the maximum compensation her family might win in the courts would be £7,500. Counsel for the BTSB also threatened her with legal costs if she did not accept the offer .

When her doctors told her she would not live to the trial date, Mrs. McCole saw she had run out of time. Negotiations continued while she was on her deathbed where on 1 October 1996, she accepted the board's full admission and offer of £175,000 . She died the next day.

== Tribunal of Inquiry into the BTSB ==
The fact that the 1991 contamination of anti-D was not publicly announced until the report of the Export Group undermined confidence in the commitment of the BTSB and Department of Health to full transparency. The legal case taken by Brigid McCole had led to the discovery of additional facts (such as the scope of the Therapeutic Substances Act, 1932 and the labelling of Patient X's blood tests as "infective hepatitis") which had been kept from the Expert Group and contributed further to the public disquiet. However, Minister Michael Noonan resisted all calls for a full Judicial Inquiry into the affair until. His position changed after Mrs. McCole died.

In a statement to Dáil Éireann on 3 October 1996, Minister Noonan revealed that the BTSB had agreed to admit liability in the McCole case on 20 September, but when Maire Geoghegan-Quinn demanded a full judicial inquiry, he cited the huge legal costs and lack of clarity that resulted from the Beef Tribunal.

A few days later, the minister had received a letter from the family of Brigid McCole in which they listed a series of questions they expected the Minister to answer.

On 8 October, the minister brought a motion before the Dáil to institute a tribunal of inquiry into the entire controversy. The terms of reference for this tribunal were based in large part on the questions submitted in the McCole family's letter. He stated that he had previously felt such a tribunal unnecessary because he expected the McCole case in the High Court to clarify any issues outstanding from the Expert Group's investigation but given the death of Mrs. McCole, that case could no longer proceed.

Under Justice Thomas Finlay, this tribunal commenced on 5 November 1996 and sat for a total of 27 days, with the press reporting daily on hearings. Although the Expert Group's report had established most of the facts of the case, the reporting of first-hand testimonies and cross examinations of victims, BTSB staff, independent experts, civil servants and politicians had a huge impact on public opinion.

One of the first witnesses to appear before the tribunal was 27-year old Bríd McCole, daughter of the late Brigid McCole who said it was her "mother's dying wish that the truth of now she suffered and the circumstances surrounding it would be revealed".

At the final hearings on 4 February 1997, Justice Finlay expressed his deep admiration for those victims who had given evidence and for the manner in which they had contributed to the tribunal with rare courage and great moderation.

At the final hearings of the tribunal, counsel for the tribunal, Mr James Nugent SC said that would not be appropriate for the tribunal to send its report to the DPP or to recommend prosecutions in the hepatitis C scandal. This opinion was echoed by Mr. Frank Clarke SC, counsel for the public interest, by Mr Patrick Hanratty, counsel for the NDAB and by Mr Paul Gallagher SC representing the BTSB.

On behalf of the BTSB, Mr Paul Gallagher SC issued an apology to all those who had become infected with hepatitis C due to the BTSB's negligence, repeated wrong decisions and breach of protocols. Counsel for the Department of Health used the final sitting to voice a comprehensive defense of the department's actions throughout the controversy.

Mr. Justice Thomas Finlay then took another four weeks to finalize his report and submit it to the Minister for Health who had it published on 11 March 1997.

Amongst the findings in the report were:

- Plasma used in the manufacture of anti-D was in breach of the BTSB's and Transfusion Medicine's standards.
- Medical staff at the BTSB failed to respond to reports that recipients of anti-D had suffered jaundice and/or hepatitis.
- The BTSB acted unethically in obtaining and using plasma from Patient X without her consent.
- They also failed to report to the NDAB and to The Board of the BTSB.
- The NDAB was deficient in carrying out its functions.

Responsibility for these failures lay to a major extent with 3 named employees of the BTSB:

- Dr. Jack O'Riordan; National Director of BTSB 1969-1985 (retired)
- Dr. Terry Walsh; National Director of BTSB 1985-1995 (retired) (Medical Consultant responsible for Patient X's treatment in 1977)
- Ms. Cecily Cunningham; Chief Laboratory Bio-chemist of the BTSB (1970-1996)

The report made many recommendations, which included re-structuring the BTSB and moving from its out-dated facilities at Pelican House.

Following the tribunal findings, Positive Action again lobbied for a statutory compensation tribunal with power to award exemplary and punitative damages. In May 1997 the bill to establish this statutory compensation tribunal, was passed in the Oireachtas, and included provision for a reparation fund of 20% of the tribunal award for exemplary and punitive damages or the option of a hearing on such damages.

The speed and efficiency with which Thomas Finlay's BTSB Tribunal conducted its business, restored confidence in the tribunal as a mechanism of resolving great controversies in the public interest.

Following the tribunal Cecily Cunningham was the only employee of the BTSB to be sacked and later took an action for unfair dismissal against them. Dr. Terry Walsh had retired but both he and Ms. Cunningham would be called before the Lindsay Tribunal examining the contamination of BTSB's products for the treatment of haemophilia with HIV and hepatitis C.

Walsh and Cunningham were arrested in 2003. Walsh died before facing court, and charges against Cunningham were dropped in 2009.

== Role of the minister(s)/Department of Health ==
In a series of heated Dáil debates that followed the death of Brigid McCole, the influence of the Government on the BTSB's legal strategy towards her case and those of other women seeking compensation came under scrutiny.

Minister Noonan's attempts to describe Mrs. McCole's acceptance of an ex gratia payment from the ad-hoc compensation tribunal as a negotiated settlement were attacked by opposition TDs who pointed out her acceptance came only when she realized she had hours to live and might otherwise get no compensation for her family. The minister faced many questions about his knowledge of and influence on the BTSB's legal strategy, its admission of liability, the scheduling of the McCole case in the High Court and the retirement of senior managers from the BTSB without ever facing sanction.

In his statement to the Dáil on 16 October 1996, Mr. Noonan suggested that Mrs. McCole's legal team had not properly represented her interests asking: "Would not the solicitors for the plaintiff have served their client better if they had advised her to go to the compensation tribunal early this year? Was it in the interest of their client to attempt to run her case not only in the High Court, but also in the media and the Dáil simultaneously?"

This course of argument caused outrage amongst opposition TDs and in the public gallery of the Dáil where representatives of Positive Action stood in protest and left. The minister returned to the house later that evening to issue an unreserved apology, for any offense his statement may have caused but the episode would dog him for the remainder of his political career.

While neither Brendan Howlin T.D. nor Michael Noonan T.D. were responsible for the Department of Health or any of its client organizations (BTSB/NDAB) when the contaminations occurred, their management of the crises and treatment of victims was subject to severe criticism by witnesses to the tribunal of inquiry chaired by Justice Finlay.

== Criminal investigation/prosecution ==
In June 1997 the new Fianna Fáil Minister for Health, Mr. Brian Cowen TD released the McCole papers. These revealed that the BTSB had information since 3 April 1995 that they were negligent, had no defence in the McCole case, but continued to fight her application for anonymity and sent her a threatening letter on her death bed.

The government sent the Finlay Report to the DPP who responded on 6 October 1997 with the decision that no criminal prosecutions would be forthcoming as a result of the report.

The McCole family wrote first to the new Minister for Health and subsequently to the Garda Commissioner, Patrick Byrne to demand an investigation. A Garda investigation began in late November 1997 which in 2003 resulted in charges being brought against two former employees of the BTSB - Dr. Terry Walsh and Ms Cecily Cunningham (Dr. Jack O'Riordan had since died) - on seven counts of Grievous Bodily Harm.

Both Dr. Walsh and Ms. Cunningham sought court injunctions to prevent their prosecutions but failed.

While their court cases were pending, the untimely death of Dr. Terry Walsh was announced and the case against Ms. Cecily Cunningham was dropped by the DPP due to the deaths of crucial witnesses.

== Depictions in popular media ==
In January 2002, RTÉ broadcast a four-part TV drama series called No Tears based on the story of the anti-D contamination and the scandals that ensued.

Written by Brian Phelan the drama was based on real events but did not use the real names of any of the parties involved and through artistic license amalgamated aspects and experiences of different people into composite characters. It starred the Oscar-winning actress, Brenda Fricker as Gráinne McFadden (based very closely on Brigid McCole), Tina Kellegher as Monica O'Callaghan (based on Jane O'Brien) and Mark Lambert as "The Minister for Health". Most other characters were composites of real women and families that were impacted by the contamination and employees of the BTSB and State Agencies who are focused on damage limitation.

Whereas, most viewers' knowledge of the story came from factual and often dry court reports and newspaper articles, the TV drama could show the emotional impact of many years of inexplicable illness on these women all over Ireland, as it first explored their back stories before the events that brought the controversy to light. The series proved hugely popular, breaking viewing figures for an Irish-produced TV drama serial but attracted a certain amount of controversy also.

Some members of Positive Action challenged the sequence of and participants in certain events but it was whether the depiction of the Minister for Health was unfair or unduly unsympathetic that stimulated most discussion.

The family of Brigid McCole denied ever giving their "blessing" to the production.

The scandal is a theme in Celia de Fréine's work, notably in Fiacha Fola ("Blood Debts"), but also including in her dystopian, post-apocalyptic novel An Dara Rogha ("Another Choice").

== Sources ==
- Mr. Justice Thomas Finlay, Report of the Tribunal of Inquiry into the Blood Transfusion Service Board (Oireachtas, 11 March 1997)
- Dr. Miriam Hederman-O'Brien, Report of the Expert Group on the Blood Transfusion Service Board / Ireland Department of Health (Oireachtas, 20 January 1995)
- Gene Kerrigan & Pat Brennan, This Great Little Nation: The A to Z of Irish Scandals and Controversies (Gill and Macmillan, 1999) ISBN 978-0-7171-2937-9
- Shane Coleman & Mick Clifford, Scandal Nation: Key Events that Shook and Shaped Us (Hachette Books Ireland, 2010) ISBN 978-0-7171-2937-9
