= Steffens =

Steffens is a surname. Notable people with the surname include:

- Bradley Steffens (born 1955), American author
- Dirk Steffens (born 1950), German musician
- Haagen Krog Steffens (1873–1917), Norwegian historian, archivist and genealogist
- Hagbart Steffens (1874–1932), Norwegian yacht racer
- Helga Paris (née Steffens; 1938–2024), German photographer
- Henrik Steffens (1773–1845), Norwegian-born Danish philosopher
- Ines Steffens, German editor
- Ingeborg Steffens (1907–1982), Norwegian actress
- Jessica Steffens (born 1987), American water polo player
- Johann Steffens (1560–1616), German organist and composer
- Karl-Heinz Steffens (born 1961), German clarinetist and conductor
- Lincoln Steffens (1866–1936), New York reporter
- Maggie Steffens (born 1993), American water polo player
- Mark Steffens (born 1953), American soccer coach
- Richard J. Steffens (1921–2008), American politician
- Roger Steffens (born 1942), American actor, author, lecturer, editor, archivist, photographer and producer
- Timor Steffens (born 1987), Dutch dancer
- Walter Steffens (disambiguation), multiple people
- William Steffens (1880–1964), Norwegian military officer

== See also ==
- Carmen Steffens, a Brazilian company
