= Health Protection Surveillance Centre =

Health Protection Surveillance Centre (HPSC)

Agency overview
- Formed: 1998; 28 years ago
- Superseding agency: none
- Jurisdiction: Ireland
- Headquarters: Dublin
- Minister responsible: Minister for Health
- Parent agency: Health Service Executive (HSE)
- Website: http://www.hpsc.ie

The Health Protection Surveillance Centre (HPSC; Irish: Lárionad Faire um Chosaint Sláinte) is part of Ireland's Health Service Executive.

== History ==
HPSC was established in 1998 and was formerly known as the National Disease Surveillance Centre (NDSC).

== Activities ==
HPSC produces annual epidemiological reports covering all areas of infectious and communicable disease surveillance carried out in Ireland. It is the designated Competent Body for liaison with European Centre for Disease Prevention and Control (ECDC) and is Ireland's national World Health Organization (WHO) International Health Regulations (IHR) focal point for communicable diseases.

HPSC monitors and reports on vaccine uptake and vaccine effectiveness, particularly in relation to the routine schedule of immunisation of babies and school age children. Monitoring of flu vaccine uptake in healthcare workers and the elderly is also carried out by HPSC.

The centre coordinates the monitoring of drug-resistant microorganisms and other key measures (such as hand hygiene compliance and antimicrobial consumption monitoring) in the prevention and control of healthcare-associated infections. HPSC participates in a number of ECDC-funded research projects including Streptococcus pneumoniae Invasive Disease network (SpID-Net), IMOVE (influenza monitoring vaccine effectiveness) and a sentinel system to assess the burden of whooping cough - PERTINENT. HPSC is a key participant in the Vaccine European New Integrated Collaboration Effort (VENICE) project and contributes to the monitoring of uptake of seasonal influenza vaccine in European Union (EU) and European Economic Area (EEA).

HPSC has been involved in behavioural surveillance among men who have sex with men e.g. Men who have Sex with Men (MSM) Internet Survey Ireland (MISI 2015) and European Men who have sex with men Internet Survey (EMIS) 2010 and 2017.

=== Infectious disease notification ===
All medical practitioners, including clinical directors of diagnostic laboratories, are required to notify the Medical Officer of Health(MOH)/Director of Public Health (DPH) of certain diseases. They must in turn notify HPSC.

=== Serosurveillance ===
The seroepidemiology unit is a multi-disciplinary team in HPSC and is a co-ordinating centre with overall responsibility for serosurveillance activities in Ireland. Its first published report on COVID-19 seroprevalence in Ireland reported that there is no threshold antibody level offering complete protection against infection but higher antibody levels are likely to be associated with a lower probability of infection.

=== Training ===
HPSC is a training site for the European Programme for Intervention Epidemiology Training (EPIET) and the Faculty of Public Health Medicine, Royal College of Physicians of Ireland.

== COVID-19 ==
HPSC has been monitoring the COVID-19 pandemic since it was notified by the World Health Organization. The general public have been advised by the Irish Government to follow advice from the Health Service Executive (HSE) and the Health Protection Surveillance Centre (HPSC) to protect their health.

The surveillance of COVID-19 cases in Ireland has been integrated into the existing national Computerised Infectious Disease Reporting (CIDR) system since COVID-19 was made a notifiable disease on 20 February 2020.

HPSC provides official data to Ireland's COVID-19 datahub.

HPSC launched their Epidemiology of COVID-19 in Ireland Data Hub in February 2022. The Data Hub provided the latest data relating to cases, deaths and outbreaks in Ireland. The COVID-19 hub was replaced in December 2023 by a new Respiratory Virus Notification Data Hub. This hub provides the latest data for COVID-19, influenza and RSV cases in Ireland. The hub also includes data on hospitalised cases, ICU cases, deaths and outbreaks in Ireland.

== EPI Insight ==
EPI Insight is a monthly newsletter published by HPSC. It was established in 1999 and describes itself as the surveillance report of HPSC. HPSC states Epi Insight's purpose is to improve the health of the Irish population by providing the best information on disease and aims to publish timely data on infectious diseases for use locally, regionally and nationally.

== CIDR ==
HPSC developed Computerised Infectious Disease Reporting (CIDR). CIDR is an information system to manage the surveillance and control of infectious and communicable diseases in Ireland. Due to the increased burden of work caused by the COVID-19 pandemic, the CIDR Team looked to a robotic solution to automate data processing tasks.

== Publications ==
- HPSC publications
- Epi Insight

== Data Hubs ==
HPSC has developed three infectious disease data hubs.

- National Notifiable Disease Hub
- Respiratory Virus Notification Data Hub
- Seroepidemiology of COVID-19 Data Hub

== See also ==
- For similar agencies elsewhere, please see the list of national public health agencies
