= Brigid McCole =

Irish health activist

- Born: Bridget Ellen Sharkey; 21 June 1942; Bunawack, Glenties, County Donegal
- Died: 2 October 1996 (aged 54); St Vincent's Hospital, Dublin

Brigid McCole (21 June 1942 – 2 October 1996) was an Irish hepatitis C campaigner.

== Early life and family ==
Brigid McCole was born Bridget Ellen Sharkey in Bunawack, Glenties, County Donegal on 21 June 1942. Her parents were John, labourer, and Ellen Sharkey (née McCole). She lived in County Donegal her whole life. On 14 August 1968 she married Brian "Briney" McCole (Mac Camhaill) from Loughaugher, Crolly, a sheep farmer. They settled in Loughaugher. Between 1969 and 1982, McCole had 6 daughters and 6 sons. Her husband was chronically ill, which compounded the difficulty of raising so many children.

== Activism ==
McCole discovered that she had been infected with hepatitis C during the 1970s, having received infected blood products during one of her pregnancies in November 1977. She was given a blood product known as Anti-D, manufactured by the Blood Transfusion Services Board (BTSB), to treat haemolytic syndrome in newborn babies. McCole came to prominence during the hepatitis C scandal from 1994 to 1996. The issue with infected blood products had been identified in 1989. The Anti-D was manufactured using the blood of a female patient who was known to have suffered from jaundice at the time of the donation in 1976. Rather than being destroyed, it was kept and administered to a large group of people, primarily pregnant women. McCole had been experiencing a decline in her health since 1988, with pain and extreme fatigue. In 1994 the BTSB announced that women who had received the Anti-D blood product should report for blood-tests for hepatitis C. It emerged that many women and men had been infected.

McCole's hardship was compounded as she had no access to private transport and with no rail service from County Donegal, she travelled alone by bus between her home and Beaumont Hospital in Dublin for treatment. BTSB reacted slowly to the unfolding crisis, and did not admit liability or offer any compensation leading to the hepatitis C crisis becoming a national scandal. A group was formed to represent those affected, Positive Action. The Irish state did not intervene to speed up the resolution of the crisis. McCole was one of the Positive Action members who met President Mary Robinson in Dublin in November 1994. This meeting showed the President's solidarity with the campaigners, but due to the Irish political system, remained symbolic support. A photograph of McCole with Robinson led to her becoming a recognisable public figure.

A compensation tribunal was announced in September 1995 by Michael Noonan, the Fine Gael health minister after a report criticised the BTSB's role in the crisis. Despite this, McCole decided to take her case to the high court, with the aim of finding the truth behind the scandal rather than compensation. In an attempt to head off the court case, the BTSB offered a settlement of £175,000 in May 1996, but this was rejected. Due to the ostracisation of sufferers in the communities, McCole attempted to use the pseudonym "Brigid Roe" but was refused. She sued the BTSB, the Irish state and the National Drugs Advisory Board under her own name. Her health continued to deteriorate, but Positive Action and John Rogers SC kept the pressure up. McCole had attempted to have a full hearing in June 1996 due to her ailing health, but this was refused and a trial date was set for 8 October 1996.

McCole was in St Vincent's Hospital, Dublin in late September 1996 dying, and was unlikely to be able to attend her high court hearing. The BTSB privately conceded liability. She was presented with the board's full admission and an offer of the original £175,000 compensation on 1 October 1996, and she accepted. McCole died of liver failure on 2 October, the first person to officially die as a direct consequence of hepatitis C caused by an infected Anti-D blood product. A public admission of liability was made on 8 October. In March 1997, the tribunal published its report, and later in August 1997 the McCole report was published and the compensation tribunal was established in law. In early 2002 RTÉ Television aired a drama series directed by Stephen Burke, No tears, starring Brenda Fricker as McCole. Her husband died by suicide in August 2000.

It emerged later that the lawyers involved in McCole's case were paid £1.35 million in fees, the majority of which was paid to the BTSB legal team. Noonan later spoke about the huge effect McCole had on him later in his political career, and the long-lasting effect of the scandal on Fine Gael. Comparisons have been drawn between the treatment of McCole to more recent campaigners such as Philomena Canning.
