= Irish Haemophilia Society =

Irish campaigning and self-help organisation

The Irish Haemophilia Society (IHS) is an organization that represents the interests of people with haemophilia, von Willebrand disease and other inherited bleeding disorders.

== History ==
The Irish Haemophilia Society was founded in 1968 when a group of people with haemophilia, their families, friends and medical practitioners recognized the need for a dedicated organization to help improve the quality of life for Irish people with haemophilia. Initially an informal, voluntary group of parents who wanted a better deal for their haemophiliac children, the IHS developed into a professional charity with a committed board and professional staff.

In 1969 a meeting of the World Federation of Haemophilia was held in Dublin, at which IHS members could meet with international experts for the first time. The government announced that it was setting up a National Haemophilia Centre at the Meath Hospital for adults and for children at the National Children's Hospital, Harcourt Street, the following year. As all treatments had to be administered in hospital, the IHS supported families from all around the country visiting their relatives who were hospitalised for significant time periods.

By 1970 ninety patients had registered with the National Haemophilia Centre, sixty five with haemophilia A, twenty one with haemophilia B and four with von Willebrand disease. In 1977 a new haemophilia centre opened at St. James's Hospital.

=== New "home-treatment" products ===
In the late 1970s technologies such as the freeze-drying of blood enabled the production of new products, which removed the dependency for all treatment to be done in hospital which had a huge impact on the lives of members. Throughout the 1980s people with haemophilia embraced the use of such products such as they offered greater independence and an improved quality of life. Unfortunately some of these products were produced from paid blood donations from other countries which were not heat treated to de-activate blood-borne viruses. Without knowing it medicines agencies in Ireland and all over the world were importing products contaminated with HIV and hepatitis C viruses. The IHS favoured the use of home-produced blood products. However, as viruses like HIV and HCV spread through the Irish population, without screening of donors or heat treatment of donations, the pools of blood used by the BTSB to manufacture its own blood products inevitably contained infected blood.

=== BTSB contamination scandals ===
In 1985 the Irish Blood Transfusion Service Board (BTSB) discovered that supplies of factor VIII (a blood product used to treat haemophiliacs) it had been importing from the US carried the risk of HIV infection. The Irish Haemophilia Society spent six years trying to obtain compensation for the almost 40% of its members affected. Minister for Health Rory O'Hanlon proposed compensation of £50,000 for each infected person. By the time the government made a settlement of £8 million in 1991, 15 of the 103 haemophiliacs who contracted HIV had died.

When the BTSB anti-D scandal broke in 1994, it was discovered that the BTSB had manufactured and distributed anti-D immunoglobulin that was infected with the hepatitis C virus in 1977 and 1991. This led to a national hepatitis C screening programme, which discovered many more people infected, who had at some point in their lives received blood transfusions supplied by the BTSB. These included people who had been in accidents, had surgical operations or were suffering from other illnesses such as haemophilia or kidney disease and need regular blood transfusions, which the BTSB, prior to 1994, had not screened for hepatitis C (and several other viruses). Some of those suffering with hepatitis C also tested positive for HIV.

==== Finlay Tribunal ====
Eventually, after campaigns by victims' support groups Positive Action and Transfusion Positive the government agreed in 1996 to establish a tribunal of inquiry to examine the circumstances, chaired by retired Justice Thomas Finlay. However, the tribunal's terms of reference, were drawn narrowly around anti-D and hepatitis C. So the focus of this tribunal was more on the hepatitis infections of mothers who had received infected anti-D.

Transfusion recipients and particularly haemophiliacs were exposed to many more occasions for infection and with products sourced from paid donors in other countries to many more viruses. The community was decimated.

The Irish Haemophilia Society was not permitted to have its own legal representation at the tribunal and although Mary Daly of IHS and some doctors conscious of the plight of haemophiliacs did testify, haemophiliacs and their families felt they were being overlooked. The IHS withdrew from the last two weeks of the tribunal's hearings.

The final report pointed out how extremely difficult it was for haemophiliacs to prove hepatitis C infection could be traced back to any specific blood product. For those infected by products other than anti-D applying to the government's ad-hoc Compensation Tribunal, the onus was on them to prove they were infected by BTSB products "on the balance of probabilities".

==== Lindsay Tribunal ====
Minister Brian Cowan instituted a new tribunal of inquiry into the practices of the BTSB, specifically focused on HIV infection of products used to treat haemophiliacs. He appointed Justice Lindsay as chair and agreed with her the terms of reference.

The tribunal of inquiry into the circumstances of infection of persons with haemophilia with HIV opened on 27 September 1999 and began hearings on 2 May 2000, and ran for 196 days. Justice Lindsay granted the IHS full rights of legal representation at this tribunal.

Throughout the period of open hearings, the IHS compiled a weekly newsletter of testimonies and legal arguments, which were sent to all members of the Society to keep them informed.

On days 189-191 of the public hearings members of the Irish Haemophilia Society got to present their own submissions and recommendations for the future.

== Services ==
Today the Society provides information, education, publications, outreach and support services for members. and organizes conferences and events for people with bleeding disorders and their families. It continues to advocate for services to enable people with bleeding disorders maximise their quality of life.
