= Caroline Hussey =

Irish microbiologist

- Born: Caroline Elinor Hussey; 3 December 1941; Dublin, Ireland
- Died: 11 May 2017 (aged 75); Dublin, Ireland
- Occupations: Microbiologist, academic, registrar

Academic background
- Education: University College Dublin and Trinity College Dublin
- Alma mater: Trinity College Dublin

Caroline Elinor Hussey (3 December 1941 – 11 May 2017) was an Irish microbiologist and academic. She served as president of the Irish Federation of University Teachers (IFUT) from 1989 to 1992. In 1994 she sat on the Expert Group investigating the circumstances of the 1977 contamination with Hepatitis C of the Blood Transfusion Service Board's Anti-D product. In the same year she was appointed the first female registrar and deputy president of University College Dublin (UCD) and remained in that post until her retirement in 2004. She was Chairperson of the National Council for Curriculum and Assessment from 1995 to 2000.

== Birth and education ==
Caroline Hussey was born on 3 December 1941 to Frank and Aileen Hussey. Frank Hussey was lecturer and housemaster at Albert College, the UCD agricultural school in Glasnevin (now DCU), and the family lived on campus for a time. She completed her primary and secondary education at the St. Mary's Holy Faith Convent in Glasnevin.

Graduating from UCD in 1962 with a degree in Biochemistry, Hussey went on to complete a PhD at Trinity College Dublin in 1966. She continued her research at TCD and was awarded a postdoctoral fellowship at Harvard University. In 1973 she returned to UCD, where she was appointed as lecturer in industrial microbiology.

== Academic career ==
During her time as lecturer in industrial microbiology, Hussey served as a member of the Governing Body of UCD and was also a member of the Senate of the National University of Ireland (NUI).

She had a particular interest in the area of health and safety. This interest led to the initiation of a Diploma in Health and Safety, a multidisciplinary programme that was taught in a number of Irish Universities. Ultimately, this contributed to the passage of the first Health, Safety and Welfare at Work Act in Ireland, in 1989.

=== Senior academic administration ===
In 1994, Hussey was appointed Registrar and Deputy President of UCD, a position she held until her retirement in 2004 She was known for her rigorous defense of academic standards and addressing quality of teaching at UCD. In 1996, she became chair woman of the National Council for Curriculum and Assessment making her, according to a profile in the Irish Times, "arguably the second most influential woman in Irish education". Niamh Bhreathnach was the Minister for Education at the time, and Caroline Hussey strongly supported her decision to abolish third level fees.

== Political activism ==
Having joined the Labour Party in the 1970s, when the late Frank Cluskey was in the ascendant, she became the first female director of elections in the country, performing this role for Ruairí Quinn through the 1970s and 1980s, a decade of political turbulence with five general elections, two of which were in 1982.

== Public Service ==
Together with her UCD colleagues, Peter Start and deputy-president Tom Walsh, she established the National Centre for Safety and Health in Ireland and contributed to the first Health, Safety and Welfare at Work Act 1989, under the auspices of her friend and political comrade, the then Minister for Labour, Ruairí Quinn which established the Health and Safety Authority.

In March 1994, Minister for Health, Brendan Howlin T.D. appointed Dr. Hussey along with Dr. Miriam Hederman O'Brien and Dr. Alistair Bellingham to the Expert Group investigating the circumstances of the 1977 contamination with Hepatitis C of the Blood Transfusion Service Board's Anti-D product administered in maternity hospitals. On January 27, 1995, the Expert Group delivered their report to the new Minister for Health, Michael Noonan T.D. who subsequently had it published.

In 2011, Hussey was appointed by the Minister for Education Ruairi Quinn as part of an advisory group to convene the forum on Patronage and Pluralism in the Irish primary education sector. The group published their report the following year.

== Crime Fiction ==
Under the pseudonym H.J. Forrest, Hussey published two crime novels; Publish or Perish (1991) and Murder by the Book (1992). Both novels were set in the familiar surrounds of UCD and South Dublin suburbs, which gave rise to great speculation in academic circles as to the author's true identity. The mystery was eventually solved by Dr Tony Scott, Dean of the Science Faculty who unmasked Dr. Hussey.

== Later life and death ==
Although she retired from academia in 2004, Dr. Hussey kept in touch with the UCD Centre for Safety and Health and never missed their annual Breakfast Seminars. Having been vice-president of UCD football club for more than 20 years, she continued to be a regular at UCD soccer matches and other events, such as the UCD Strictly Come Dancing event.

She died in Dublin on 11 May 2017 after a short illness.

== Publications ==
=== Academic ===
- Newell, Martina; McLOUGHLIN, Aiden J.; Hussey, Caroline (1 April 1987). "The relationship between copy number and stability of recombinant plasmids in Bacillus subtilis". Biochemical Society Transactions. 15 (2): 281–282. doi:10.1042/bst0150281a. ISSN 0300-5127.
- Licken, Brian; McLOUGHLIN, Aiden. J.; Hussey, Caroline (1 April 1987). "The effect of the growth environment on the stability of recombinant plasmids in Bacillus subtilis". Biochemical Society Transactions. 15 (2): 282–283. doi:10.1042/bst0150282. ISSN 0300-5127.
- Licken, Brian; McLOUGHLIN, Aiden J.; Hussey, Caroline (1 April 1988). "Factors influencing the expression and maintenance of recombinant plasmids in Bacillus subtilis". Biochemical Society Transactions. 16 (2): 194–195. doi:10.1042/bst0160194. ISSN 0300-5127.
- Byrne, Denis; Hussey, Caroline; McLOUGHLIN, Aiden J. (1 April 1988). "The effect of reactor configuration on plasmid loss". Biochemical Society Transactions. 16 (2): 193–194. doi:10.1042/bst0160193. ISSN 0300-5127.
- Newell, Martina; McLOUGHLIN, Aiden J.; Hussey, Caroline (1 April 1988). "The effect of gene expression on copy number and heritable stability of recombinant plasmids in Bacillus subtilis". Biochemical Society Transactions. 16 (2): 192–193. doi:10.1042/bst0160192a. ISSN 0300-5127.
- Byrne, Denis; McLOUGHLIN, Aiden J.; Hussey, Caroline (1 February 1991). "Plasmid maintenance alters substrate affinity". Biochemical Society Transactions. 19 (1): 32S. doi:10.1042/bst019032s. ISSN 0300-5127.

=== Fiction ===
- Hussey, Caroline (1991). Publish or Perish. Sandycove, Co. Dublin: Glendale Press. ISBN 978-0717119752.
- Hussey, Caroline (May 1992). Murder by the Book. Dublin: Gill & MacMillan. ISBN 978-0717119752.

== Sources ==
- UCD News & Opinion: Dr. Caroline Elinor Hussey: 1941 - 2017
- NUI chancellor expresses sympathy on the death of Dr Caroline Hussey (15.05.2017)
- University College Dublin: Dr Caroline Hussey CSHW Obituary
- Irish Federation of University Teachers: Death of Dr Caroline Hussey
- Irish Times Obituary: Dr. Caroline Hussey, Consummate scientist and mathematician with well-honed political instincts
- Ireland's second mistress
