= COVID-19 vaccination in France =

Plan to immunize against COVID-19

French vaccination campaign against COVID-19
- Date: 27 December 2020 – present
- Location: France
- Cause: COVID-19 pandemic in France
- Target: Full immunisation of people in France against COVID-19
- Participants: 53,895,155 people have received at least one vaccine dose 52,581,073 people have been fully vaccinated
- Outcome: 80.3% of the French population have received at least one vaccine dose 78.3% of the French population have been fully vaccinated
- Website: solidarites-sante.gouv.fr/grands-dossiers/vaccin-covid-19/

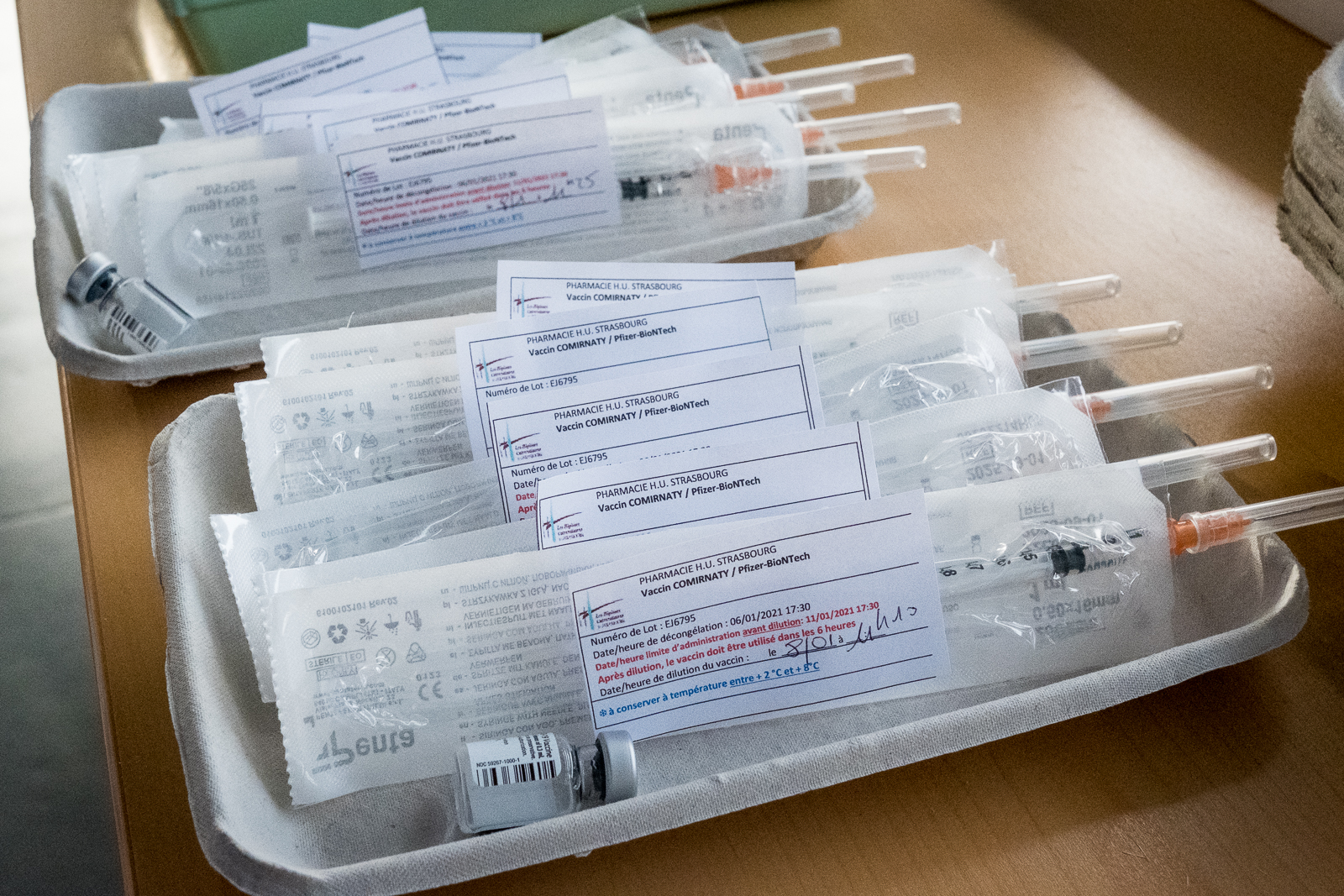
Pfizer vaccines ready to be injected in a vaccination center on 8 January 2021 in Strasbourg.

COVID-19 vaccination in France started on 27 December 2020 after the approval of Pfizer–BioNTech COVID-19 vaccine by the European Union commission.

According to a June 2022 study published in The Lancet, COVID-19 vaccination in France prevented an additional 631,000 deaths from December 8, 2020, to December 8, 2021.

== Vaccines on order ==
There are several COVID-19 vaccines at various stages of development around the world.

Vaccine	Approval	Deployment
Pfizer–BioNTech	21 December 2020	27 December 2020
Moderna	6 January 2021	12 January 2021
Oxford–AstraZeneca	29 January 2021	6 February 2021
Janssen	11 March 2021	23 April 2021
Novavax	20 December 2021	Not yet
Valneva	Pending	Not yet
Sanofi–GSK	Pending	Not yet
CureVac	Request withdrawn	No

== Vaccines in trial stage ==
Vaccine	Type (technology)	Phase I	Phase II	Phase III
VLA2001	Inactivated	Completed	Completed	In progress
CoVepiT	Subunit	In progress	Not yet	Not yet
TMV-083	Viral vector			

== Vaccination strategy ==
The vaccination strategy put in place by the government has three principal objectives:

1. Reduce mortality and severe forms of the disease
2. Protect caregivers and the healthcare system
3. Ensure vaccine and immunization safety

The vaccine is planned to be distributed in five phases.

=== Phase 1 ===
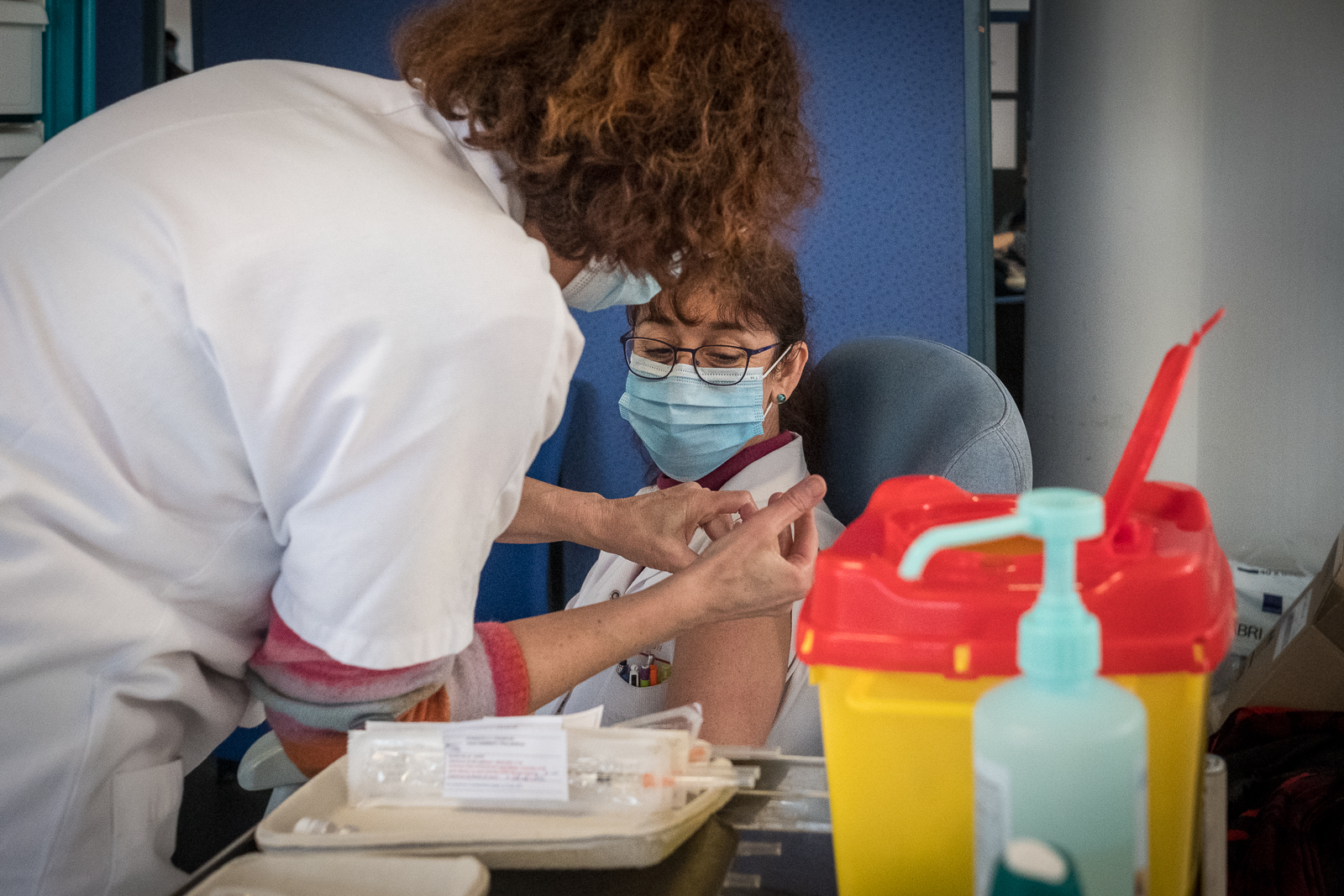
Vaccination of a health worker at the Strasbourg University Hospital on 8 January 2021.

The first phase of vaccination concerns the highest-priority audiences. Since 27 December 2020, it initially concerned nursing home and ESMS residents and staff over the age of 50. Vaccination has been open to caregivers over 50 since 2 January 2021, then to firefighters and domestic caregivers over 50 since 5 January 2021.

=== Phase 2 ===
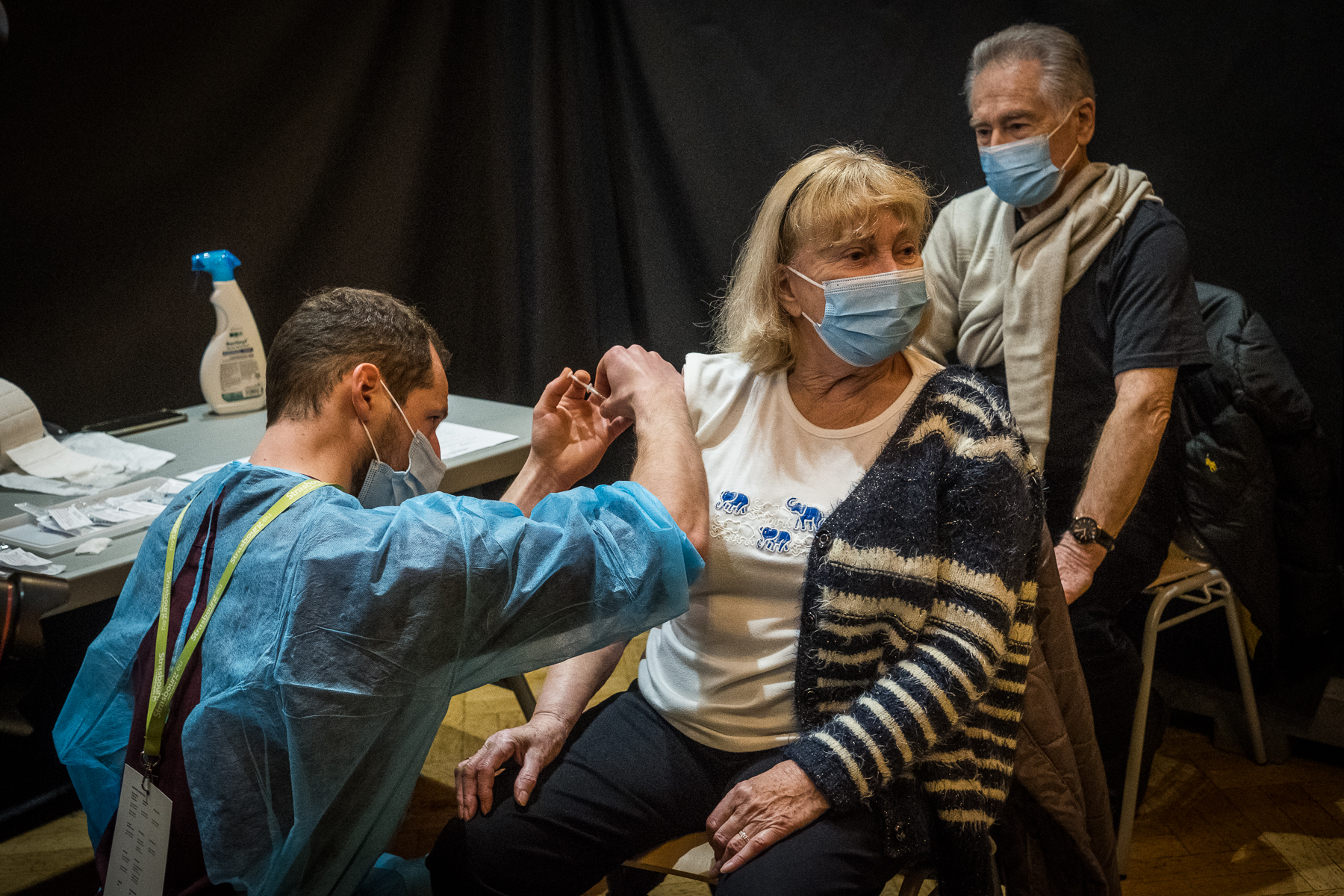
Vaccination of people aged over 75 in Strasbourg on 18 January 2021.

This phase concerns people at high risk. From 18 January 2021, people aged 75 and over who do not reside in ESMS or nursing homes can be vaccinated. This phase will last until the end of February and concerns 5 million people. From the end of February, the vaccination will be open to people aged 65 to 74.

=== Phase 3 ===
This phase concerns people who are more vulnerable than the general population. It will take place in the spring and include the following people.

- People aged 50 to 64.
- Precarious people and the staff accompanying them.
- People living in closed places or in collective accommodation.
- People with co-morbidities (COPD, hypertension, coronary heart disease, renal failure, cancers less than 3 years old or in progress, Trisomy 21, type I and II diabetes, obesity, people who have received organ or cell transplants strains).
- People working in an essential sector and in contact with the public (education, security, food.).

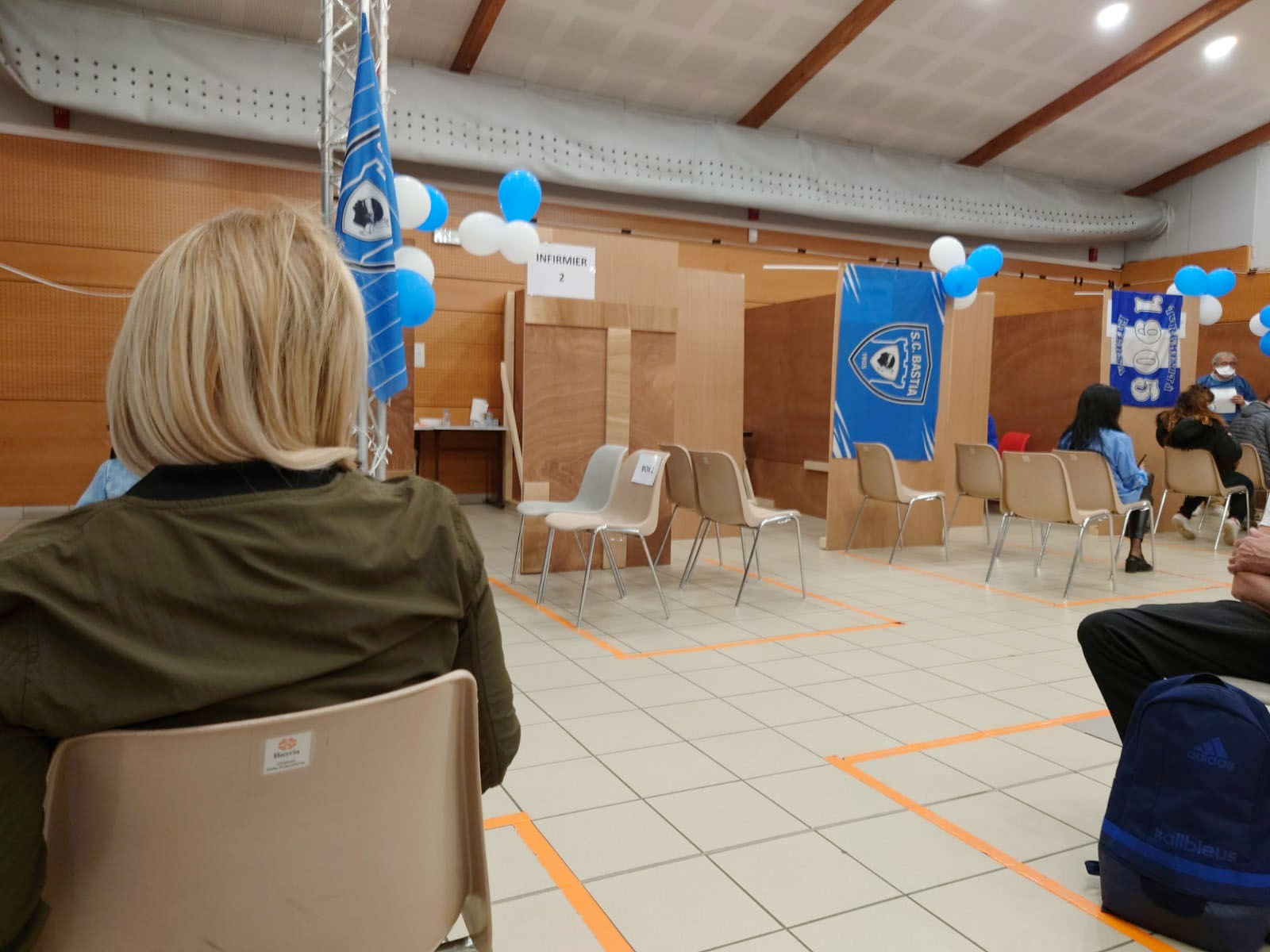
Despite official priorities, any person older than 18 May be vaccinated in Bastia since 30 April 2021 Photo taken on 2 May 2021

=== Phase 4 and 5 ===
Phases 4 and 5 will allow vaccination to be widely opened to those over 18.

== Progress to date ==
Daily updates were provided by Santé Publique France.

== Vaccine deliveries ==
The following table details the weekly number of authorized vaccines delivered to France since the start of the crisis. Among the suppliers, AstraZeneca is by far the most late compared to its initial commitments. In the 1st quarter of 2021, AstraZeneca is expected to deliver 30 million doses to the European Union, while the initial forecast was 120 million.

== See also ==
- COVID-19 pandemic in France
- Deployment of COVID-19 vaccines
- EU Digital COVID Certificate
