= Eurosurveillance =

- Discipline: Epidemiology
- Language: English
- Edited by: Ines Steffens

Publication details
- History: 1995–present
- Publisher: European Centre for Disease Prevention and Control
- Frequency: Weekly
- Open access: Yes
- Impact factor: 21.286 (2021)

Standard abbreviations
- ISO 4: Eurosurveillance

Indexing
- ISSN: 1025-496X (print); 1560-7917 (web)
- OCLC no.: 474084452

Links
- Journal homepage; Online archive

Eurosurveillance is an open-access medical journal covering epidemiology, surveillance, prevention, and control of communicable diseases with a focus on topics relevant for Europe. The journal is a non-profit publication and is published by the European Centre for Disease Prevention and Control.

== History ==
The journal is jointly funded by the European Commission, the Réseau national de santé publique (later, Institut de Veille Sanitaire now Agence nationale de santé publique) in Paris, France, and the Public Health Laboratory Service (later, Health Protection Agency and Public Health England now UK Health Security Agency) in London, England, and a pilot issue was published in 1995. In 2005, collaboration started with the newly established European Centre for Disease Prevention and Control (ECDC) in Stockholm and a weekly epidemiological bulletin was published. Two years later, in 2007, the journal was transferred entirely to ECDC, which has published it since. Karl Ekdahl became the newly appointed editor-in-chief in 2008 and since 2011, Ines Steffens has been editor-in-chief of the journal.

== Publishing model ==
Since its beginning, the journal is an open access online journal that does not charge article processing fees. The journal's website does not host any form of commercial advertisement.

== Abstracting and indexing ==
The journal is abstracted and indexed in PubMed/MEDLINE, Scopus, Embase, and EBSCO databases.

== Metrics and impact ==
According to the Journal Citation Reports, the journal has a 2021 impact factor of 21.286.

== Scientific seminars ==
Since 2011, on the occasion of the 15th anniversary, the journal has been holding annual scientific seminars at the European Scientific Conference on Applied Infectious Disease Epidemiology. Invited speakers are public health experts and scientists; the seminars aim to stimulate a discussion about public-health-related scientific developments.
