= Lindsay Tribunal =

1999 Irish public health investigation

The Lindsay Tribunal was set up in Ireland in 1999 to investigate the infection of haemophiliacs with HIV and Hepatitis C from contaminated blood products supplied by the Blood Transfusion Service Board.

There are about 400 haemophiliacs in Ireland. According to the tribunal a 'minimal figure' of 250 haemophiliacs were infected with HIV or Hepatitis C while receiving treatment from the BTSB before 1985.

Haemophilia is a genetic condition where the blood does not clot as quickly as normal due to a deficiency in certain proteins. This means they can suffer from internal bleeding - bruises and sprains can be much more serious for haemophiliacs.

Haemophiliacs may be treated by transfusions of the protein they are deficient in. One source of this protein is from human blood. Heat-treatment of blood products was started in the mid-eighties. Heat-treatment of blood products reduces the probability of infection from them. Since 1992 recombinant proteins are generally used, which contain little, if any, human blood products - and thus have a negligible risk of contamination.

Most of the blood products used by the BTSB were from local donations. However, some of it came from American suppliers which included blood from prisoners and drug addicts, who had a high risk of infection.

== Findings ==
The Tribunal criticised the National Haemophilia Centre for its slow response to the risk of HIV infection. Findings of the Tribunal included:

- Patients were routinely started on home-treatment with possibly-dangerous commercial blood products, after the risk of infection had been discovered.
- Unheated blood products were probably not recalled after the safer heat-treated products became available.
- There was no formal means for communicating with regional centres to stop using unheated blood-products.
- There was an unacceptable delay between testing for HIV and Hepatitis and notification of the results (up to 4 years)
