= Irish Federation of University Teachers =

- Founded: 1965
- Headquarters: 11 Merrion Square Dublin D02
- Location: Ireland
- Members: 1700
- Key people: Frank Jones (General Secretary) Miriam Halton (Deputy General Secretary)
- Affiliations: ICTU, Education International, Eurodoc
- Website: www.ifut.ie

The Irish Federation of University Teachers (IFUT; Irish: Cónaidhm Éireannach na Múinteoirí Ollscoile) is a trade union representing university staff, including lecturers, postdoctoral researchers, tutors, librarians and other grades in Ireland.

The union originated among a group of teachers at Maynooth College, who met informally from 1962 to 1964. In 1965, they formed the IFUT, and held its first general meeting in 1966. Among the founder members was Kader Asmal, who also founded and led the Irish Anti-Apartheid Movement.

By the time the union registered, in 1970, it had fifty members at universities in Ireland. It grew rapidly, and by 2005 had around 1,700 members. The union is affiliated to the Irish Congress of Trade Unions, Education International and the European Council of Doctoral Candidates and Junior Researchers (Eurodoc).

== Leadership ==
=== General Secretaries ===
1975: Kieran Mulvey
1980: Daltún Ó Ceallaigh
2007: Mike Jennings
2017: Joan Donegan
2021: Frank Jones

Originally the general secretary was termed the executive secretary.

=== Chairmen and Presidents ===
1965: J. J. Morrissey (UCD)
1968: Thomas Desmond Williams (UCD)
1969: George Dawson (TCD)
1970: Sean Lavelle (UCG)
1971: Robin Dudley Edwards (UCD)
1972: Enda McDonagh (Maynooth)
1974: Kader Asmal (TCD)
1975: Seosamh Hanly (UCD)
1977: Patrick J. O'Flynn (UCD)
1979: John L'Estrange
1980: Fergus Lalor (UCC)
1981: Bernard McCartan (TCD)
1983: Keith Warnock (UCG)
1985: John T. Lewis (DIAS)
1987: Garrett Barden (UCC)
1989: Caroline Hussey (UCD)
1992: Anne Clune (TCD)
1994: Eugene Wall (MICL)
1997: Maureen Killeavy (UCD)
2001: Pat Burke (SPD)
2003: Brendán Ó Cochláin] (NUIG)
2006: Joe Brady (UCD)
2010: Hugh Gibbons (TCD)
2011: Marie Clarke (UCD)
2013: Rose Malone (Maynooth)
2015: Michael Delargey (UCC)
2017: Aidan Seery (TCD)
2019: Angela Flynn (UCC)
2021: Anthony Harvey (RIA)
2023: Emma Sokell (UCD)
2025: Michael Hinds (DCU)
2027: Edward Lahiff (UCC)

The role was termed chairman from 1965-1972 and president from 1972 to present. The term limit of the president is currently set at 2 years.
