= Regional Health Agency =

French health administration

- Agence régionale de santé

Agency overview
- Formed: April 1, 2010; 16 years ago
- Preceding agencies: Regional hospitalization agencies; Regional directorates of health and social affairs; Departmental directorates of health and social affairs; Regional unions of the health insurance funds
- Jurisdiction: Regions of France
- Headquarters: Varies by region (17 agencies)
- Minister responsible: Minister responsible for Health
- Agency executive: Director General
- Key document: Law 2009-879 of 21 July 2009 ("Hospital, Patients, Health and Territory")

A Regional Health Agency (Agence régionale de santé) is an administrative public body of the French State responsible for implementing health policy in its region. Created on 1 April 2010, the regional health agencies are governed by Title III of Book IV of the first part of the Public Health Code (code de la santé publique).

== Establishment ==
These institutions, created under the law 2009-879 of July 21, 2009 entitled "Hospital, Patients, Health and Territory", are intended to ensure a unified management of health in the regions, better meet the needs of the population and increase the effectiveness of the system. In concrete terms, one of their roles is to modernize and rationalize the supply of care and to ensure the proper management of hospital and medical expenses. The agencies act within the framework of a Regional Health Project which can be the subject of local health contracts concluded by the agency, in particular with the local authorities and their groupings, concerning the promotion of health, prevention, care policies and medico-social support.

They are financed by a State subsidy, contributions from the health insurers and the Caisse nationale de solidarité pour l'autonomie, as well as, possibly, their own resources and voluntary payments from local authorities or institutions.

== History ==
They replace the former regional hospitalization agencies (agences régionales de l'hospitalisation), created in 1996 which had the status of public interest groups (groupements d'intérêt public), the regional directorates of health and social affairs, the departmental directorates of health and social affairs and the directorates of health and social development in Guadeloupe, French Guiana and Martinique. They also replace the regional unions of the health insurance funds (unions régionales des caisses d'assurance maladie).

== Operation ==
They are supervised by the ministers responsible for health, social security, the elderly and the disabled, administered by a Director General with a supervisory board. The Director General grants authorizations of health facilities and services and medico-social institutions and services.

The supervisory board is chaired by the regional prefect and has 24 members:

- Three representatives of the State;
- Ten representatives of the health insurers, chosen by the representatives of the trade union organizations;
- Four representatives of local authorities;
- Three representatives of the users of the health, social and medico-social system;
- four qualified personalities;

The supervisory board approves the budget and the financial accounts. It issues an opinion on the regional strategic plan and the multi-year contract of objectives and means.

Each agency has a regional health and autonomy conference that contributes to the development of health policy in the region and two public health policy coordination commissions, one for prevention, school health, occupational health and maternal and child health, the other for care and medico-social support.

In each region, the agency implements public health policies in services responsible for health at work, school and university health and maternal and child health:

- It monitors the health status of the region, monitors compliance with hygiene rules and participates in the prevention and education of patients.
- It carries out health inspection missions on behalf of the state and may intervene in the event of a health emergency.
- It evaluates the training of health professionals and helps them at the time of their installation.
- It participates in the control of medical acts and the dispensing of health products.
- It conducts regional health insurance programs, particularly in the area of risk management.
- It authorizes the creation and activity of health facilities and health services. It also authorizes the creation of certain categories of social and medico-social establishments and services.
- It participates in the control of these establishments, in particular to verify the respect of the rights of users.
- It encourages the implementation of a cultural component in these institutions.
- In the health-environment sector competence includes: water & food: quality of human drinking water, quality of bathing water, swimming pools and recreational fishing sites, protection of the water resource; indoor environment: in the habitat; indoor air quality, fight against unhealthy habitat;

external environment: noise pollution, outdoor air quality, healthcare waste, impact on the health of human activities.

The regional health agency located in the administrative center of the defense and security zone is known as the regional zone agency. It is responsible for assisting the zone prefect in the implementation of national security and especially health defense missions, and thus to prepare and apply, if necessary, the ORSEC plan.

== Structure ==
Since 2016 there have been 17 regional health agencies.

List of regional health agencies
Name	Location
Auvergne-Rhône-Alpes	Lyon
Bourgogne-Franche-Comté	Dijon
Brittany	Rennes
Centre-Val de Loire	Orléans
Corsica	Ajaccio
Grand Est	Nancy
Guadeloupe	Pointe-à-Pitre
French Guiana	Cayenne
Hauts-de-France	Lille
Île-de-France	Paris
Martinique	Fort-de-France
Normandy	Caen
Nouvelle-Aquitaine	Bordeaux
Océan Indien (La Réunion et Mayotte)	Saint-Denis
Occitania	Montpellier
Pays de la Loire	Nantes
Provence-Alpes-Côte d'Azur	Marseille

== Criticism ==
The establishment of regional health agencies has disrupted practices within hospitals. Initially supporting the role of the ARS as local relays of health and social strategies of the State, and supporting the institutions in their governance choices, the Hospital Federation of France has complained about the bureaucratic drift which imposes on institutions choices sometimes guided solely by economic imperatives and profitability. Since 2010, the federation has requested that the role and prerogatives of the agencies be reviewed, and regularly underlines the difficult dialogues between the directorates of the institutions and the agencies. The intervention of Guy Collet gives a reflection of a generally very mixed assessment of the agencies:

"The operation of ARS is marked by an excess of bureaucracy" [...] "Hospitals have the feeling of a constant intrusion into their management and management" [...] "they must leave professionals the choice of ways and means to achieve these goals."

== See also ==
- French National Public Health Agency
