= European Programme for Intervention Epidemiology Training =

Clinical surveillance program

The European Programme for Intervention Epidemiology Training (EPIET) Fellowship provides training and practical experience in intervention epidemiology at the national centres for surveillance and control of communicable diseases in the European Union. The fellowship is aimed at EU medical practitioners, public-health nurses, microbiologists, veterinarians and other health professionals with previous experience in public health and a keen interest in epidemiology.

== Aims ==
The aims of the programme are:

- To strengthen the surveillance of infectious diseases in EU member states and at Community level
- To develop response capacity at national and Community level to meet communicable disease threats through rapid and effective field investigation and control
- To develop a European network of public health epidemiologists using standard methods, and sharing common objectives
- To contribute to the development of the Community network for the surveillance and control of communicable diseases.

== Structure ==
The EPIET Fellowship lasts two years. Ten percent of this time is taken up by formal training courses and the remainder by a placement at a training site in a European country. The fellowship starts with a three-week introductory course in infectious disease epidemiology. This course provides basic knowledge of intervention epidemiology, including outbreak investigation, surveillance and applied research.

Following the introductory course, fellows spend 23 months at a training site in an EU member state, Norway, Switzerland, the WHO or at the European Centre for Disease Prevention and Control (ECDC). During the training period, fellows will:

- analyse, design, or implement a surveillance system
- assist in the development of international surveillance networks
- perform outbreak investigations
- develop a research project on a relevant public health issue
- develop knowledge of laboratory techniques
- assist in the analysis of public health decisions
- teach epidemiology
- present the results of their work at the annual scientific conference ESCAIDE

In addition to the introductory course, 4-5 one-week modules are organised throughout the fellowship. The modules focus on one or several specific public health topics, such as: computer tools in outbreak investigations; multivariable regression; time series analysis; vaccinology; laboratory methods for epidemiologists.

== Funding ==
The Fellowship is funded by the European Centre for Disease Prevention and Control (ECDC) and the EU member states. The ECDC took over the coordination of the programme on November 1, 2007, as the European Commission funded project components ended in 2007.

== See also ==
- Eurosurveillance
