= Ines Steffens =

German epidemiologist

- Scientific career
- Fields: Public health; Epidemiology
- Workplaces: Eurosurveillance; Robert Koch Institute
- Website: www.eurosurveillance.org/board

Ines Steffens is the editor-in-chief of Eurosurveillance. She succeeded Karl Ekdahl in this role in 2011.

== Career ==
Prior to joining Eurosurveillance, Steffens worked at the Robert Koch Institute, where she was editor-in-chief of the Epidemiologisches Bulletin, Germany's national epidemiology journal. She joined Eurosurveillance as managing editor in 2006 and became editor-in-chief in 2011. She spoke on behalf of Eurosurveillance at the 2015 International Conference on Emerging Infectious Diseases.

Steffens is a member of the editorial board of the European Food Safety Authority's journal. She was a member of the European Association of Science Editors' Gender Policy Committee and the peer review committee in 2017. In addition, she was a member of the association's programme committee for the 2020 conference where she presented a virtual talk on how the COVID-19 pandemic had affected Eurosurveillance

== Education ==
Steffens studied medicine at University of Mainz, graduating in 1994. In 2000, while studying at Technische Universität Berlin, she co-signed a letter published by the Verein Demokratischer Pharmazeutinnen und Pharmazeuten (association of pharmacists) defending Rolf Rosenbrock of espionage accusations.
