= French National Public Health Agency =

Government agency

- Santé publique France

Public administrative establishment overview
- Formed: 1 May 2016
- Preceding agencies: Institut de veille sanitaire (InVS); Institut national de prévention et d'éducation pour la santé (Inpes); Établissement de préparation et de réponse aux urgences sanitaires (Éprus); Addictions Drogues Alcool Info Service (Adalis)
- Jurisdiction: France
- Headquarters: Saint-Maurice, Val-de-Marne, France
- Employees: 625 (2019)
- Annual budget: €200 million (2019)
- Minister responsible: Minister of Health
- Public administrative establishment executives: Caroline Semaille, Director General; Marie-Caroline Bonnet-Galzy, President of the Board
- Parent Public administrative establishment: Ministry of Health (France)
- Website: www.santepubliquefrance.fr

The French National Public Health Agency (L'Agence nationale de santé publique, ANSP), also known as Santé publique France, is a French public administrative establishment under the supervision of the Ministry of Health. The president of its board of directors is appointed by a decree of the President of the French Republic.

Established under the Health System Modernization Law, Santé publique France was created on 1 May 2016. It succeeded the Institut de veille sanitaire (InVS), the Institut national de prévention et d'éducation pour la santé (Inpes), the Établissement de préparation et de réponse aux urgences sanitaires (Éprus), and Addictions Drogues Alcool Info Service (Adalis).

== History ==
The creation of Santé publique France stemmed from a preliminary report submitted on 2 June 2015 to Marisol Touraine, then Minister of Social Affairs, Health, and Women's Rights, by François Bourdillon, Director General of InVS and Inpes. This report followed various parliamentary analyses, inspections, evaluations, and expert reports on existing health agencies, leading to the territorial reform law passed on 25 November 2014, which reduced the number of French regions from 22 to 13 and introduced metropoles. The agency was formed by merging three existing health agencies under the Ministry of Health:

- The Institut de veille sanitaire (InVS), established in 1998, focused on continuous health surveillance, monitoring, alerts, and crisis management.
- The Institut national de prévention et d'éducation pour la santé (Inpes), created in 2002, implemented public health programs, provided expertise in prevention and health promotion, and managed urgent or exceptional health situations. It replaced the French Committee for Health Education (CFES).
- The Établissement de préparation et de réponse aux urgences sanitaires (Éprus), founded in 2007, managed the health reserve and strategic pharmaceutical stocks.

The agency was formalized through the Health System Modernization Law of 26 January 2016 and an ordinance of 14 April 2016. François Bourdillon emphasized its population-focused approach, distinguishing it from agencies like the National Agency for the Safety of Medicines and Health Products (ANSM), which oversees product safety, the National Agency for Food, Environmental, and Occupational Health Safety (Anses), which evaluates risks, or the High Authority for Health (HAS), which focuses on practice quality. The agency aims to emulate models like the Centers for Disease Control and Prevention (CDC) in the United States or Public Health England, prioritizing comprehensive public health knowledge, protection, and promotion.

== Activities ==
=== Missions ===
Santé publique France conducts continuous epidemiological surveillance to monitor population health, enabling tailored health policies, addressing health issues, and responding to exceptional health situations. It maintains ongoing health monitoring to identify health risks early and supports efforts to reduce health inequalities through health promotion and prevention strategies. The agency also innovates by piloting experimental programs across French territories. Its missions align with the first pillar of the 2018–2022 National Health Strategy: promoting health and prevention across all settings.

=== Programming ===
The Ministry of Health sets five-year objectives for Santé publique France through a Contract of Objectives and Performance (COP), first signed by Agnès Buzyn, Minister of Solidarities and Health, in 2018. The 2018–2022 COP outlined six strategic and 22 operational goals, covering epidemiological surveillance, prevention, crisis preparedness, policy expertise, and partnerships. The agency develops multiyear programs to define its priorities, validated annually by its board of directors. The 2018–2022 program focused on determinants and settings, populations, major diseases, territories, interventions, and infrastructure.

=== Strategic priorities ===
By 2022, Santé publique France aimed to address:

- Climate change, including vector-borne diseases and heatwaves, through a dedicated program;
- Strengthening evidence-based data expertise to guide prevention programs; Studying the health impacts of pollutants in living and working environments;
- Maintaining robust health monitoring capabilities;
- Implementing public health social marketing, such as the "Tobacco-Free Month" campaign; Regionalizing actions through 15 regional intervention units (Cire) and tools like Géodes for regional data.

== Organization ==
=== Governance ===
==== Board of directors ====
The board, comprising 32 members, sets strategic directions, programs, and resource allocation. It includes nine state representatives, one from mandatory health insurance schemes, four institutional partners, three health professionals, four association representatives, two local elected officials, two qualified experts, three agency staff, two deputies, and two senators. Members serve four-year terms, renewable once. The president, appointed by presidential decree, has been Marie-Caroline Bonnet-Galzy since 18 December 2017.

==== Scientific council ====
The 27-member scientific council, appointed for four years, ensures the quality and coherence of the agency’s scientific policies, advising on research, expertise, and partnerships.

==== Ethics and Deontology Committee ====
This seven-member committee, appointed for four years, ensures compliance with ethical and deontological standards, preventing conflicts of interest.

==== Orientation and Dialogue Committee ====
Comprising 10 to 20 members, this committee optimizes agency actions, communication during health crises, and prioritizes public health issues.

=== Leadership ===
The agency is led by:

- A Director General;
- 10 cross-disciplinary scientific directorates;
- Five support directorates;
- A directorate for activity support. Directors General have included:
- François Bourdillon (2016–June 2019);
- Martial Mettendorff (interim, June–October 2019);
- Geneviève Chêne (November 2019–October 2022);
- Caroline Semaille (since 23 February 2023).

=== Budget and resources ===
In 2019, the agency employed 625 staff with a budget of approximately €200 million. In 2020, it received a state allocation of €150,155,356, plus an exceptional €860 million for epidemic prevention and strategic stockpiling.

=== Regional presence ===
Santé publique France operates 15 regional intervention units (Cire) to conduct epidemiological surveillance, monitor population health, issue health alerts, and manage local crises under the agency’s regional directorate.

=== Headquarters ===
The agency’s headquarters in Saint-Maurice, Val-de-Marne, near the Bois de Vincennes, spans three buildings:

- The 19th-century Château de Vacassy, originally a hospital for World War I casualties, established under a 1876 decree from a bequest by Jean-Joseph Vacassy;
- The Villermé building, designed by AIA Architecte in 2012;
- The Simone Veil building, a wooden structure completed in 2019 by Atelier du Pont Architecte.

== Health reserve ==
Established in 2007, the health reserve supports public health responses during crises exceeding normal capacities, involving volunteer health professionals. It has been deployed during outbreaks like chikungunya and the COVID-19 pandemic in France.

== European and international activities ==
=== European level ===
Santé publique France collaborates with European public health agencies, including:

- The European Centre for Disease Prevention and Control (ECDC), coordinating exchanges and participating in its activities;
- The European Food Safety Authority (EFSA), focusing on food safety risks;
- The European Agency for Safety and Health at Work (EU-OSHA), supporting France’s focal point. The agency contributes to European Commission projects on infectious diseases, chronic diseases, injuries, work, environment, and training, coordinating surveillance and health alerts.

=== International level ===
Santé publique France supports the World Health Organization’s European Bureau and co-funds WHO-European Commission projects. It serves as the secretariat for the International Association of National Public Health Institutes, established in 2006, and is a member of the International Union for Health Promotion and Education (IUHPE).

== Documentary portal ==
Santé publique France’s documentary portal compiles its scientific outputs, including the Bulletin épidémiologique hebdomadaire (BEH), Géodes data, health barometer studies, a registry of promising interventions, the magazine La santé en action, and prevention materials.

The BEH, a free publication, features articles from public health stakeholders, with its editorial board partly composed of agency members.

Géodes provides regional and national health indicators in interactive maps, charts, and tables.

Health barometers, initiated by CFES in 1992, guide public health policies by analyzing behaviors like vaccination, smoking, alcohol consumption, and cancer screening.

The registry of validated interventions catalogs evidence-based prevention programs.

La santé en action is a quarterly magazine on health promotion and prevention.

The agency publishes prevention and surveillance materials, including epidemiological updates on diseases like influenza and dengue.

== Prevention initiatives ==
=== Thematic prevention websites ===
Santé publique France manages thematic prevention websites and funds remote health assistance programs.

=== Remote health assistance ===
In 1998, Inpes launched the "Tabac Info Service" helpline. Since 2003, it has managed various remote health assistance programs. In 2014, the "Health Assistance Quality Label" was introduced to ensure service quality, requiring compliance with specific standards.

== See also ==
=== Related agencies ===
- Regional Health Agency
- European Centre for Disease Prevention and Control
- European Food Safety Authority
- European Agency for Safety and Health at Work

=== Related topics ===
- Health policy
- French healthcare system
- Public health, Environmental health
- Health crisis, Crisis management
