= Walter Steffens =

Walter Steffens may refer to:

- Walter Steffens (gymnast) (1908–2006), Olympic gymnastic champion
- Walter Steffens (composer) (born 1934), German composer

== See also ==
- Walter Steffen (1886–1937), American college football player and coach, lawyer, politician, and judge
- Walter Stephens, alias of Reginald Walter Stenning (1903–1923), British Army deserter who joined the Irish Republican Army
