= Miriam Hederman O'Brien =

Irish barrister, academic and university leader (1932–2022)

Miriam Hederman O'Brien (6 June 1932 – 14 March 2022) was an Irish barrister and academic, who held the posts of Chancellor of the University of Limerick and Director of the University of Limerick Foundation.

== Life and career ==
Miriam Hederman was born in Naas, County Kildare on 6 June 1932, the youngest of three children of William and Mary Hederman, drapers in Naas and Newbridge. She had two older brothers, Supreme Court Justice and Attorney-General Anthony J. Hederman and William Hederman, a Vincentian priest.

Hederman O'Brien died at a care home on 14 March 2022, at the age of 89.

== Affiliations ==
- Trustee, Louvain Development Trust for the Irish Institute for European Affairs
- Vice-President, Statistical and Social Enquiry Society of Ireland
- Guest lecturer, Department of Economics, Trinity College, Dublin
- Guest lecturer, European affairs, University College, Cork

== Personal life ==
She was married to William 'Bill' S O’Brien. They had five children.

== Awards and legacy ==
In 2013, she was named 2013 Ireland's Most Powerful Woman.

The Miriam Hederman O'Brien Research Prize is awarded by the Foundation for Fiscal Studies.
