= Institut de veille sanitaire =

Institut de veille sanitaire (Sanitary Surveillance Institute)

Agency overview
- Formed: 1998
- Dissolved: 2016
- Superseding agency: Agence nationale de santé publique (National Public Health Agency)
- Jurisdiction: France
- Headquarters: Saint-Maurice cedex
- Minister responsible: Marisol Touraine, Minister of social affairs and Health (France)
- Agency executives: Dr Françoise Weber, Director General; Jean-Claude Desenclos, Scientific Director
- Parent agency: French Ministry of Social Affairs and Health
- Website: Official website

The Institut de veille sanitaire (InVS; English: French Institute for Public Health Surveillance, literally "Institute of Health Surveillance") was a French public establishment of the Health minister. It was merged in 2016 with other health agencies into the Agence nationale de santé publique (Santé Publique France; English: French National Public Health Agency, literally "National Agency for Public Health").

Its mission was to survey the health of the population and, if required (for example in the case of an epidemics), to alert the administration, health specialists and the whole of the population. This surveillance role was shared with other public organisations such as the Agence nationale de sécurité du médicament et des produits de santé (ANSM) and the Agence française de sécurité sanitaire de l'alimentation, de l'environnement et du travail (Anses).

The Institut de veille sanitaire was criticized by the press for its lack of response during the European heat wave of 2003 but was cleared by several official commissions.

== History ==
A public administrative establishment, placed under the supervision of the Minister for Health, the Institute for Health Surveillance (InVS) succeeds the National Public Health Network (RNSP). It brings together surveillance, vigilance and alert missions in all areas of public health. Created by the law of July 1, 1998, relating to the strengthening of health monitoring and control of the health safety of products intended for humans, InVS saw its field of action supplemented and reinforced by the law of August 9, 2004, on public health policy, in order to respond to the new challenges revealed by recent health crises and emerging risks.

Its first managing director was Jacques Drucker, succeeded by Gilles Brücker in 2002, then Françoise Weber in 2007 and François Bourdillon in 2014.

The 2016 law on the modernization of the health system provides for the creation of the national public health agency, the merger of the health monitoring institute, the national institute for prevention and health education, the preparation establishment and response to health emergencies, effectively created on 1 May 2016.

== See also ==
- List of national public health agencies
