= European Centre for Disease Prevention and Control =

Agency of the European Union

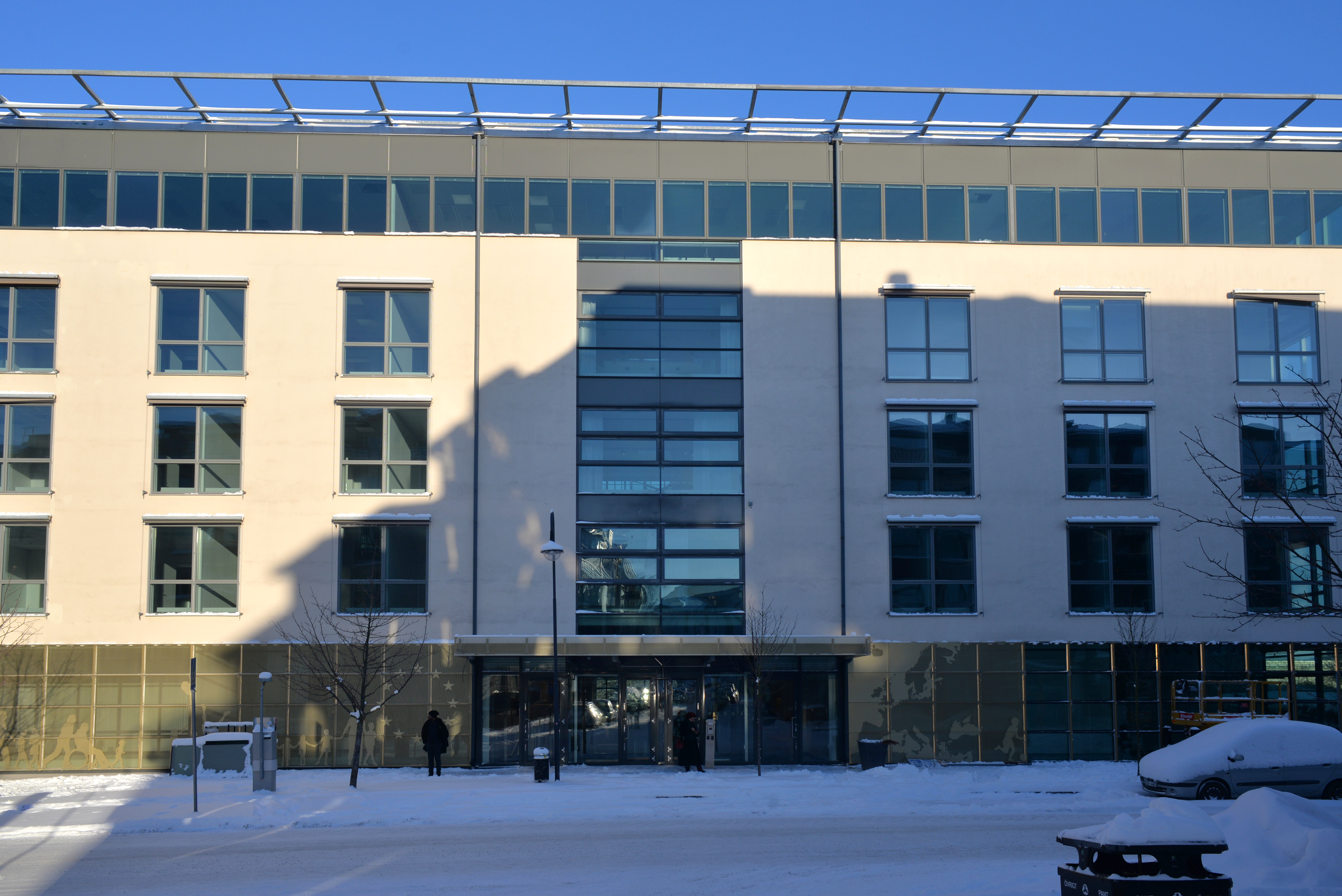
- ECDC headquarters in Solna, Sweden

Agency overview
- Formed: 28 September 2004
- Jurisdiction: European Union
- Headquarters: Solna Municipality, Stockholm County, Sweden; 59°22′22″N 18°1′2″E
- Annual budget: €57 million EUR (2020)
- Agency executive: Pamela Rendi-Wagner, director
- Key document: Regulation (EC) 851/2004
- Website: ecdc.europa.eu

The European Centre for Disease Prevention and Control (ECDC) is an agency of the European Union (EU) whose mission is to strengthen Europe's defences against infectious diseases. It covers a wide spectrum of activities, such as: surveillance, epidemic intelligence, response, scientific advice, microbiology, preparedness, public health training, international relations, health communication, and the scientific journal Eurosurveillance. The centre was established in 2004 and is headquartered in Solna, Sweden.

== Legal basis ==
The ECDC was established by Regulation (EC) No 851/2004, deriving its legal basis from Articles 251(2) and 152(4) TEC, which together allow the European Commission to submit proposals for regulations seeking to achieve the EU's objectives of ensuring public health.

== History and operations ==
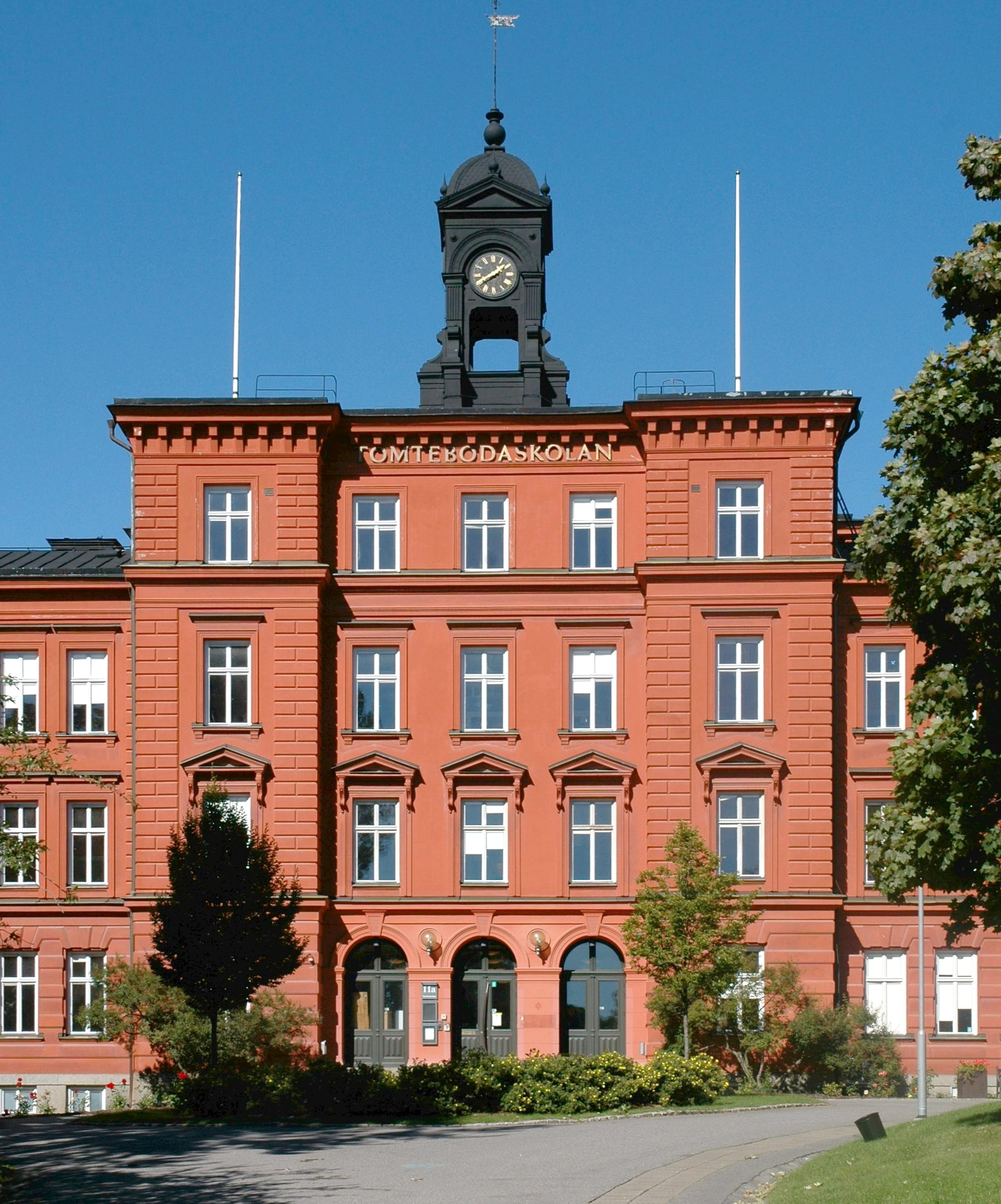
Former seat of ECDC, the Tomteboda School, Solna

As EU economic integration and open frontiers increased, cooperation on public health issues became more important. While the idea of creating a European centre for disease control had been discussed previously by public health experts, the 2003 SARS outbreak and the rapid spread of SARS across country borders confirmed the urgency of the creation of an EU-wide institution for public health. ECDC was set up in record time for an EU agency: the European Commission presented draft legislation in July 2003; by the spring of 2004, Regulation (EC) 851/2004 had been passed, and in May 2005 the centre became operational.

The European Parliament appointed UK Conservative John Bowis as rapporteur for the regulation, thus making him responsible for drafting of the report, its presentation to Parliament, and navigating it through the legislative process.

The relevance of the centre's mission was confirmed shortly after it began operating, when the arrival of H5N1 avian influenza in the EU's neighbourhood led to fears that the disease could adapt or mutate into a pandemic strain of human influenza. The centre moved to its current location at Gustav III:s Boulevard in Solna, Sweden, on 3 March 2018.

The ECDC manages key initiatives that focus on surveillance and response support, and public health capacity and communication, while the office of the chief scientist oversees the Microbiology Coordination Section and the Scientific Advice Coordination Section, along with seven Disease Programmes.

The Disease Programmes focus on specific disease groups:

- Antimicrobial resistance and Healthcare-associated infections
- Emerging and Vector-borne Diseases
- Food- and Waterborne Diseases and Zoonoses
- Sexually Transmitted Infections, including HIV and Blood-borne Viruses
- Influenza
- Tuberculosis
- Vaccine-preventable diseases

== Interaction with EU institutions ==
EU institutions (European Commission, European Parliament, and the Council of the European Union) have a direct relationship in the functioning of the ECDC by providing oversight and funding and receiving strategic guidance from the agency.

The ECDC is responsible for providing strategic guidance and ensuring that the EU's activities align with broader EU health policies and objectives. This involves setting priorities, outlining long-term goals, and integrating the ECDC's work into the EU's overall public health strategy. EU institutions also ensure financial oversight by allocating the ECDC's annual budget, monitoring expenditures, and ensuring that resources are used effectively and transparently. Through its Health Security Committee, the Commission collaborates especially closely with the ECDC to respond to health emergencies, share information, and implement joint actions across member states.

== Collaboration with other EU agencies ==
European Medicines Agency (EMA): The ECDC collaborates with EMA on monitoring vaccine safety, pharmacovigilance, and managing public health emergencies.

European Food Safety Authority (EFSA): Joint efforts focus on controlling animal diseases and foodborne pathogens.

Joint Research Centre (JRC): Cooperation involves research and data sharing on emerging health threats.

European Union Drugs Agency (EUDA): To collaborate on prevention efforts regarding the spread of drug-related infectious diseases across the EU.

== Publications ==
ECDC publishes numerous scientific and technical reports covering various issues related to the prevention and control of communicable diseases. Comprehensive reports from key technical and scientific meetings are also produced by the organization.

Towards the end of every calendar year, ECDC publishes its Annual Epidemiological Report, which analyses surveillance data and infectious disease threats. As well as offering an overview of the public health situation in the European Union, the report offers an indication of where further public health action may be required in order to reduce the burden caused by communicable diseases.

The European Centre for Disease Prevention and Control is monitoring the Middle East respiratory syndrome coronavirus.

Other ECDC publications include disease-specific surveillance reports and threat reports, as well as analyses of trends in European public health.

== Eurosurveillance ==
Eurosurveillance, a European peer-reviewed journal devoted to the epidemiology, surveillance, prevention and control of infectious diseases, has been published by ECDC since March 2007. The journal was founded in 1995 and, before its move to ECDC, was a collaborative project between the European Commission, the Institut de Veille Sanitaire (France) and the Health Protection Agency (United Kingdom). Eurosurveillance is an open-access (i.e. free) web-based journal that reports infectious disease issues from a European perspective. It publishes results from ECDC and the EU-funded surveillance networks, thereby providing the scientific community with timely access to new information. The journal is published every Thursday.

== Member states ==
In addition to the member states of the union, three members of the European Economic Area also participate in the ECDC network: Iceland, Liechtenstein, Norway.

The United Kingdom benefited from the ECDC during the Brexit transition period from 1 February to 31 December 2020.

== COVID-19 ==
During the COVID-19 pandemic, involved in the European Union response to the COVID-19 pandemic the ECDC published data related to COVID-19 such as the number of people affected in the European Union.

== See also ==
- European Medicines Agency
- European Programme for Intervention Epidemiology Training
- List of national public health agencies
- World Health Organization
- Communicable diseases
- Pandemic
- Public health
- Health Threat Unit
