= Irish Blood Transfusion Service =

Healthcare organization in Dublin, Ireland

The corporate logo incorporates a stylised pelican, as well as the name of the service.

The Irish Blood Transfusion Service (IBTS), or Seirbhís Fuilaistriúcháin na hÉireann in Irish, was established in Ireland as the Blood Transfusion Service Board (BTSB) in 1965, taking its current name in 2000. The Service provides blood and blood products for humans. It is responsible to the Minister for Health

== History ==
It was established in 1965.

The service is the successor to the National Blood Transfusion Association which was established in 1948 and was, itself, born from the work carried out by the St. John Ambulance Brigade of Ireland in setting up an 'on call' blood donor panel to serve hospitals in the Dublin area. In 1975 the Cork Blood Transfusion Service was amalgamated with the board, and in 1991 the Limerick Blood Transfusion Service was amalgamated with the board.

The symbol of the service is a stylised pelican, recalling the legend of the Pelican in her piety. For most of its existence, the headquarters of the service was located at Pelican House on 52 Lower Leeson Street in Dublin which opened in 1950. Eventually it was moved to new nearby building on Mespil Road in 1981. In 2000 the service moved to the National Blood Centre on the grounds of St. James's Hospital near Dublin Heuston railway station, on which it remains. The service maintains regional facilities at Ardee, Carlow, Cork, Limerick and Tuam.

=== Infected blood product scandals ===
In 1994, the BTSB informed the Minister for Health that a batch of "Anti-D" blood product they had distributed in 1977 for the treatment of pregnant mothers had been contaminated with the Hepatitis C virus. Following a report by an expert group, it was discovered that the BTSB had produced and distributed a second infected batch in 1991. The Government established a Tribunal of Enquiry to establish the facts of the case and also agreed to establish a tribunal for the compensation of victims.

The Hepatitis C and HIV Compensation Tribunal was established by the Hepatitis C Compensation Tribunal Act 1997, and amended by the Hepatitis C Compensation Tribunal (Amendment) Act 2002, to compensate people who contracted hepatitis C or HIV as a result of receiving blood or blood products from the Service.

The BTSB anti-D scandal triggered a general examination of the BTSB's procedures for screening blood products for the treatment of Hemophilia and exposed the unwitting infection of many Hemophiliacs with HIV, Hepatitis B and Hepatitis C. This resulted in the closure of the BTSB's main laboratory, curtailment in the production of some blood products, widespread changes to the management and structure of the organization and its eventual renaming in 2000. It took its current name in April 2000 by order of the Minister for Health

== About blood ==
The frequency of blood groups in Ireland is as follows:

O Positive	47%	O Negative	8%	A Positive	26%	A Negative	5%
B Positive	9%	B Negative	2%	AB Positive	2%	AB Negative	1%

It is important that the IBTS collects enough O Rh D positive blood as almost half the population are that blood type. Donors with O Rh D negative are known as universal donors. Their blood can be transfused to patients of any other blood group in an emergency or if the patient's own blood group is unavailable. Because any patient can receive O Rh D negative blood, the IBTS need to have extra O Rh D negative blood available at all times.

=== Eligibility to donate ===
The service depends entirely on voluntary donations from the public. New donors must be aged between 18 and 64, weigh over 50 kilograms (7 stone 12 lbs), and be in good health. At every donation haemoglobin levels are checked and donors complete a detailed health and lifestyle questionnaire. Donors can donate blood every 90 days.

The IBTS imposes a number of restrictions on those who can give blood. A four-month restriction is placed on donors who have had piercings or tattoos or had acupuncture, and a similar restriction on anyone who has visited a tropical country (three months). There is a year-long deferral for those who have visited a malarial area.

Additionally, there are groups of people who are permanently barred from donating blood based on their membership of high-risk groups. People who have ever been injected with any kind of non-prescription drug, and anyone who have ever been paid for sex with money or drugs are also permanently barred from donating blood.

==== Ban on men who have sex with men ====
Up to 28 November 2022, men who have sex with men (MSM) could not donate blood if they had engaged in oral or anal sex with another man at least 4 months prior to a donation. This policy came into effect from 28 March 2022 and came under heavy criticism from politicians, such as the Labour Party's Senator Annie Hoey and Sinn Féin Senator Lynn Boylan, as well as the public due to a perceived lack of scientific basis for the policy and the lack of information on the reason for the rule. The IBTS has also been criticised for rolling back on the recommendation formally adopted by its Board in September 2021 to remove oral sex between men as a grounds for deferral from March 2022.

From January 2017 to March 2022, MSM were required to abstain from all oral and anal sex for a 12-month period prior to donation. This position had replaced the previous lifetime deferral for any man who had ever engaged in oral or anal sex with another man.

From the end of November 2022, all prospective blood donors, regardless of sexual orientation or gender, may donate blood if they have not engaged in anal sex with a new partner, or multiple partners, in the 4 months prior to the donation.

=== Donor Awards ===
Donors are recognised for their commitment by being awarded as follows: A silver award is given for 10 donations; a gold award for 20 donations; a gold drop-shaped lapel pin (representing blood) for 50 donations; and presentation at an awards dinner ceremony, and a porcelain pelican, for 100 donations.

=== Platelets and bone marrow ===
The Irish Blood Transfusion Service is also responsible for the collection of blood platelets and for managing the Unrelated Bone Marrow registry in Ireland. Donors can give platelets at the National Blood Centre in St James Hospital in Dublin or at St Finbarr's Hospital in Cork. Donors can join the unrelated bone marrow registry through their local blood clinic by offering an extra blood sample and satisfying suitability criteria.

== See also ==
- Northern Ireland Blood Transfusion Service
