= List of national public health agencies =

This list of national public health agencies includes national level organizations responsible for public health, infectious disease control, and epidemiology. Many are represented in the International Association of National Public Health Institutes and discussed at national public health institutes.

== National public health agencies ==
=== Africa ===
- Ethiopian Public Health Institute (EPHI; Ethiopia)
- Instituto Nacional de Saúde (INS; Mozambique)
- Institut National pour la Recherche Biomedicale (INRB; Democratic Republic of Congo)
- Kenya Medical Research Institute (KEMRI; Kenya)
- National Institute for Communicable Diseases (NICD; South Africa)
- National Institute for Medical Research (NIMR; Tanzania)
- Nigeria Centre for Disease Control (NCDC; Nigeria)
- Pasteur Institute of Algeria (Institut Pasteur d’Algérie, IPA; Algeria)
- Pasteur Institute of Morocco (Institut Pasteur du Maroc, IPM; Morocco)
- Zambia National Public Health Institute (Zambia)

=== Asia ===
- Korea Disease Control and Prevention Agency (KDCPA; South Korea)
- Centers for Disease Control (CDC; Taiwan)
- National Administration of Disease Prevention and Control (国家疾病预防控制局; People's Republic of China), established on 13 May 2021
- Chinese Center for Disease Control and Prevention (CCDC; People's Republic of China)
- Centre for Health Protection (CHP; Hong Kong)
- Institute of Epidemiology, Disease Control and Research (IEDCR; Bangladesh)
- National Center for Disease Prevention and Control (NCDPC; Philippines)
- National Centre for Disease Control (NCDC; India)
- Disease Control Division (DCD), Ministry of Health (MOH; Malaysia)
- National Centre for Infectious Diseases (NCID), Communicable Diseases Agency (CDA; Singapore)
- National Institute of Health (NIH; Pakistan)
- National Institute of Health Research and Development (NIHRD; Indonesia)
- National Institute of Infectious Diseases (NIID; Japan)
- National Institute of Public Health (NIPH; Japan)
- National Institute of Health of Thailand (Thai NIH; Thailand)
- National Institute of Hygiene and Epidemiology (NIHE; Vietnam)

=== Europe ===
- Austrian National Public Health Institute (Gesundheit Österreich GmbH, GÖG; Austria)
- Centre for Disease Prevention and Control of Latvia (CDPC; Slimību profilakses un kontroles centrs, SPKC; Latvia)
- Center for Public Health (of the Ministry of Health of Ukraine) (TsHZ, Центр громадського здоров’я Міністерства охорони здоров’я України; Ukraine)
- Danish Health Authority (SST; Denmark)
  - Responsibility of handling epidemiology and epidemic outbreak is shared with the Danish Patient Safety Authority and the Governmental Serum Institute.
- Directorate of Health (Embætti landlæknis; Iceland)
- Federal Office of Public Health (FOPH; Switzerland)
- Finnish Institute for Health and Welfare (THL; Finland)
- Health Protection Surveillance Centre (HPSC; Ireland)
- Instituto de Salud Carlos III (ISCIII; Spain)
- Higher Institute of Health (Istituto Superiore di Sanità) (ISS; Italy)
- National Institute of Public Health – National Institute of Hygiene (NIPH–NIH; Poland)
- National Institute of Public Health, Prague (NIPH; Státní zdravotní ústav, SZÚ; Czech Republic)
- National Public Health Organization (NPHO, former HCDCP; Greece)
- Nemzeti Népegészségügyi és Gyógyszerészeti Központ (NNGYK; Hungary)
- Netherlands National Institute for Public Health and the Environment (Rijksinstituut voor Volksgezondheid en Milieu, RIVM; Netherlands)
- Norwegian Institute of Public Health (FHI; Norway)
- Public Health Agency of Sweden (Sweden)
- Republic Institute for Health Protection (North Macedonia)
- Robert Koch Institute (RKI; Germany)
- Santé publique France i.e. French National Public Health Agency (France)
- Sciensano (Belgium)
- Public Health Authority (PHA; Úrad verejného zdravotníctva, ÚVZ; Slovak Republic)
- National Institute of Health Dr. Ricardo Jorge (Instituto Nacional de Saúde Dr Ricardo Jorge, Portugal)

==== Russia ====
- Rospotrebnadzor (Russia)

==== United Kingdom ====
- UK Health Security Agency (UKHSA; England)
  - Public Health England (PHE; England)
- Public Health Wales (PHW; Wales)
- Public Health Agency (PHA; Northern Ireland)
- Public Health Scotland (PHS; Scotland)

=== North America ===
- Public Health Agency of Canada (PHAC; Canada)
- National Institute for Research on Nutrition and Health (INCIENSA; Costa Rica)
- Pedro Kourí Tropical Medicine Institute (IPK; Cuba)
- Secretaría de Salud (SALUD; Mexico)

==== United States ====
- Centers for Disease Control and Prevention (CDC; United States)
  - Epidemic Intelligence Service
  - U.S.-Mexico Border Infectious Disease Surveillance Project
  - National Center for Injury Prevention and Control
  - State Level
    - California Department of Public Health#Center for Infectious Disease (CID; California)
    - Massachusetts Department of Public Health Bureau of Communicable Disease Control (Massachusetts)

=== Oceania ===
- Centre for Disease Control (Australia) (CDC); Australia

=== South America ===
- Administración Nacional de Laboratorios Carlos Malbrán (ANLIS, Malbrán; Argentina)
- Agência Nacional de Vigilância Sanitária (ANVISA; Brazil)
- Public Health Institute of Chile (ISP; Chile)
- National Institute of Health (of Colombia) (INS; Colombia)
- Instituto Nacional de Salud (INS; Peru)

== International NPHI related organizations and centers covering several countries ==
- Africa Centres for Disease Control and Prevention (African Union)
- Caribbean Public Health Agency (CARICOM)
- Centers for Disease Control and Prevention – Central American Region (CDC-CAR; Guatemala, El Salvador, Nicaragua, Costa Rica, Panama, Belize)
- European Centre for Disease Prevention and Control (ECDC; EU)
  - Eurosurveillance
  - European programme for intervention epidemiology training (EPIET)
  - ESCAIDE
  - Health Threat Unit
- World Health Organization (WHO; United Nations)
- International Association of National Public Health Institutes (IANPHI)
