= Nigerian Health Watch =

Nigeria Health Watch is a not-for-profit health communications and advocacy organisation dedicated to promoting better health outcomes for Nigerians. By combining expertise in both health and communication, the organisation actively engages with the government and the public to raise awareness and disseminate knowledge on a wide range of health issues in Nigeria. Through various communications methods, Nigeria Health Watch works to strengthen the capacity of health sector institutions and influence policy for impact.

== Mission and Vision ==
The organisation's mission is to equip Nigerians with the tools and knowledge necessary to make informed decisions about their health. It advocates for improved access to quality health services at both federal and state levels, emphasising transparency and necessary health reforms. Nigeria Health Watch envisions a Nigeria where all individuals, regardless of income, have access to improved and affordable quality healthcare.

== History ==
- 2015: The Health Watch Foundation was formally registered with the Corporate Affairs Commission (CAC). In June of the same year, the inaugural Future of Health Conference, themed "Defining the Health Sector of our Dreams in Nigeria," was held in Abuja.
- 2016: Co-curator Dr. Chikwe Ihekweazu was appointed by President Muhammadu Buhari as the chief executive officer of the Nigeria Centre for Disease Control, leading to his resignation from the management of Nigeria Health Watch to join its board.
- 2017: The organization secured its first major project from the United Nations, with UNICEF engaging it to conduct advocacy for malnutrition prevention in three states in North West Nigeria.
- 2021: Launch of the Solutions Journalism Africa Initiative (SJAI) in partnership with the Solutions Journalism Network, highlighting significant innovations and initiatives driving improvements in the Nigerian health sector.
- 2022: Hosted the 8th Nigeria Health Watch Future of Health Conference, themed "The Political Economy of Health: Investing in the Future of Nigeria.
- 2023: Launched and implemented the U=U Campaign in collaboration with Apin Public Health Institute across social media platforms and select radio stations across the country. Using a mix of communcations methods, the campaign targeted messaging on regular HIV testing and ART adherence towards young people in the country.
- 2024: Hosted 10th Future of Health Conference on climate change and how it affects health. Through various innovative approaches (podcasts, partner-led side events, etc) the conference generated policy discussions and evidence-based solutions for health challenges linked to climate change.
- 2025: Provided technical communications support to the West Africa Health Organisation in hosting the 2nd ever ECOWAS Lassa Fever International Conference, #ELFIC2025.

== Activities ==
Nigeria Health Watch utilises various platforms to disseminate health information and advocate for policy changes:

- Thought Leadership Series: Weekly publications analysing challenges and showcasing noteworthy solutions in the Nigerian health sector.
- Torchlight Stories: Solutions-focused reporting on what is working, how it works and what it takes to sustain and scale impact.
- Radio Show: In collaboration with Nigeria Info 95.1 FM Abuja, the organization co-hosts a monthly radio show titled "#OpenMoH," encouraging greater citizen engagement on health issues.
- Solutions Journalism Africa Initiative (SJAI): Launched in 2021 in partnership with the Solutions Journalism Network, this initiative highlights significant innovations and initiatives driving improvements in the Nigerian health sector.
- Future of Health Conference: An annual event that convenes stakeholders to discuss and strategize on pressing health issues in Nigeria.
- Curated Conversations: A platform that brings together key health experts, policymakers, and thought leaders for candid 20–30-minute conversations on salient and timely health issues. On YouTube.
- Break It Down Podcast: an audio series that simplifies complex health policies and social development issues for the public.

== Collaborations and Partnerships ==
The organisation collaborates with various stakeholders, including government agencies, non-governmental organizations, and international bodies, to amplify efforts in strengthening health security and advancing healthcare in Nigeria. Notably, Nigeria Health Watch has been recognised for its partnership with the Nigeria Centre for Disease Control and Prevention, especially in advocacy for improved funding for epidemic preparedness and support towards risk communications during health crises.

== Recognition ==
Nigeria Health Watch has been acknowledged for its significant contributions to health communication and advocacy in Nigeria. The organisation's efforts in amplifying the work of health institutions and advocating for improved healthcare policies have been instrumental in driving positive change within the Nigerian health sector.
