= IPH =

IPH may refer to:

== Airport ==
- Sultan Azlan Shah Airport

== Institutes ==
- Institute of Public Health (Bangladesh)
- Addis Continental Institute of Public Health
- Institut für Integrierte Produktion Hannover

== Companies ==
- Iowa Pacific Holdings
- Islamic Publishing House

== Chemical compounds ==
- Isopropylphenidate

== Medical conditions ==
- Idiopathic pulmonary haemosiderosis
- Intraparenchymal hemorrhage
- Inflammatory papillary hyperplasia
