= Public Health Agency =

Public Health Agency may refer to:

- Public Health Agency of Canada
- Public Health Agency (Northern Ireland)
- Public Health Agency of Sweden

== See also ==
- List of national public health agencies
- National public health institute
