= Ifedayo Adetifa =

Nigerian paediatrician and infectious diseases epidemiologist

Ifedayo Morayo Adetifa, a Nigerian paediatrician and infectious diseases epidemiologist, is the former Director General of the Nigeria Centre for Disease Control (NCDC). He was appointed to this role in September 2021 by President Muhammadu Buhari to replace Dr. Chikwe Ihekweazu who was the head of the agency since August 2016.

Before his appointment as Director-General, he was Clinical Epidemiologist, Epidemiology & Demography Department, KEMRI-Wellcome Trust Research Programme (KWTRP), Kilifi, Kenya and an Associate Professor of Infectious Diseases Epidemiology at the London School of Hygiene & Tropical Medicine, London, UK.

== Career ==
In 2004, Adetifa advanced to work as a Research Clinician and subsequently as a Clinical Epidemiologist at the Medical Research Council Unit, The Gambia (MRCG), carrying out investigations largely on Tuberculosis Epidemiology and Immuno-epidemiology studies including clinical investigation aimed at expounding the correlates of disease and protection in TB and identifying surrogates of treatment efficacy. During his time there he won the European and Developing Countries Clinical Trials Partnership (EDCTP) career development fellowship.

In 2009, he was awarded a Master of Science degree in Epidemiology at the London School of Hygiene and Tropical Medicine (LSHTM) and in 2012 he earned a PhD in Tuberculosis Epidemiology at the University of Amsterdam.

In 2014, Adetifa joined the LSHTM and KWTRP following the completion of his fellowship program, there his research focused on the epidemiology of vaccine preventable diseases aims to generate evidence for vaccine policy in developing countries especially of tropical Africa. Adetifa implemented disease and Serological surveillance, examined approaches to monitoring vaccination, conducted vaccine impact studies, performing health economic evaluations, and complemented all these with scientific concept.

Adetifa's current area of work are centered on evaluating the effect of the vaccine against strep pneumoniae introduced in Nigeria in 2015, COVID-19 epidemiology, and other related areas. In 2018, Adetifa received the Medical Research Council and Department for International Development (MRC/DFID) Africa Research Leader Fellowship award to fund his vaccine seroepidemiology research.

== Personal life ==
Adetifa was born in the Nigerian state of Lagos. He is married to Uche Adetifa whom he has three kids with.
