= Hellenic Centre for Diseases Control and Prevention =

The Hellenic Centre for Diseases Control and Prevention, HCDCP (Greek: Κέντρο Ελέγχου και Πρόληψης Νοσημάτων, ΚΕΕΛΠΝΟ) was Greece's public health organization until 2019. It was based in Athens, Greece, and was named "HCIDC" (Hellenic Centre for Infectious Diseases Control) up to 2005.

HCDCP was replaced in 2019 and its full successor is the National Public Health Organization.

== See also ==
For similar agencies, please see the list of national public health agencies
