= BIDS =

There are several elaborations for BIDS.

- Bangladesh Institute of Development Studies
- Boeing Integrated Defense Systems
- Microsoft's Business Intelligence Development Studio, a development environment for building business intelligence solutions
- The U.S.-Mexico Border Infectious Disease Surveillance Project, a three-year infectious disease surveillance project undertaken by the Centers for Disease Control and Prevention and the Mexican Secretariat of Health.
- Brain Imaging Data Structure, a standard for organizing, annotating, and describing data collected during neuroimaging experiments.

== See also ==
- BID (disambiguation)
