= International Association of National Public Health Institutes =

The International Association of National Public Health Institutes (IANPHI) is an international umbrella organization of national public health institutes (NPHIs), public health government agencies working to improve national disease prevention and response. IANPHI is made up of 100+ members, located in more than 90 countries. An important goal of IANPHI is to improve health outcomes by strengthening NPHIs or supporting countries in creating new NPHIs.

As of 2023 IANPHI’s president is professor Duncan Selbie, former chief executive of Public Health England. The IANPHI Secretariat is based at Santé Publique France, and the US Office is located at the Emory University Global Health Institute in Atlanta, Georgia. The IANPHI Foundation is located in Finland at the Finnish Institute for Health and Welfare. Coordinated by Secretary General Jean Claude Desenclos, the IANPHI team is responsible for member relations and programs, policy, communications and NPHI development projects, and the IANPHI annual meeting.

At its inception (2002-2006), IANPHI received seed funds from the Rockefeller Foundation and a one-year planning grant from the Bill & Melinda Gates Foundation (BMGF). BMGF subsequently awarded multi-year funds for IANPHI's development and to support projects to build NPHIs in low- and middle-income countries. Resources have since been contributed e.g. by the Centers for Disease Control and Prevention (CDC) A recent role for IANPHI has been to work with the Child Health and Mortality Prevention Surveillance (CHAMPS) project.

== The National Public Health Institute model ==
The national public health institutes (NPHI) model, exemplified by the U.S. Centers for Disease Control and Prevention (CDC), Chinese Center for Disease Control and Prevention (China CDC), Public Health Agency of Canada (PHAC), Instituto Nacional de Salud Pública of Mexico (INSP Mexico), Oswaldo Cruz Foundation of Brazil (FIOCRUZ Brazil) and others, is an effective and cost-efficient way to systematically develop and sustain national public health systems. NPHIs have been major contributors to reductions in morbidity and mortality from infectious and noncommunicable conditions. Many, including the U.S. CDC and the National Institute for Health and Welfare (Finland), have developed over several decades, while others, including NPHIs in Liberia and Canada, were created following threats such as Ebola and SARS, in recognition that a coordinated system with a specialized institution is needed to effectively respond to disease threats.

NPHIs usually lead national efforts for disease surveillance and outbreak investigation (to monitor population health trends and detect and resolve outbreaks), laboratory services (to identify and confirm disease threats), health programs (including recommendations for immunizations and maternal and child health initiatives), and public health workforce development and research (including new treatments and technologies). NPHIs are designed to give governments the ability to assess and address major acute and long-term disease threats in a country using scientific, evidence-based policies and strategies, as well as create a career home for public health researchers and scientists, thereby fostering the evidence-based approaches necessary to ensure that government policies are based on scientific evidence rather than politics.

== History and activities ==
In 2002, the directors of nearly 30 NPHIs met in Bellagio, Italy to share best practices and discuss opportunities for collaboration. In 2004, the group reconvened in Helsinki and declared its intention to forge an alliance.

IANPHI was formally launched at the first General Assembly in Brazil in January 2006, with 39 founding members and a one-year grant from the Gates Foundation. Under a subsequent five-year grant from the Gates Foundation awarded in late 2006, the membership has expanded to 100 institutes in 88 countries around the world.

IANPHI's activities fall into three areas:

- Projects (targeting investments to create or strengthen NPHIs in low-resource countries)
- Policy (developing a framework, tools and policy papers for public health system strengthening)
- Leadership development (creating an international community of NPHI directors)

== Peer-to-Peer Partnerships ==
One of IANPHI's distinctive features and strengths is a peer-assistance approach that facilitates sharing of expertise and experience among member NPHIs. The model clearly benefits the recipient NPHI by identifying strategies to address priority needs and raising standards of performance for organizing and conducting public health functions. But it rewards the contributing institute as well – by sharing skills and assets to benefit others while also linking resources and solutions to address regional and global health threats and opportunities.

For the network of IANPHI members, the model provides unique opportunities for NPHIs to link with others that are geographically or linguistically similar or are struggling with similar technical or programmatic issues, such as information system development or pandemic preparedness. This collaborative approach also provides a platform for developing research or programs to address shared issues, whether laboratory safety or avian influenza, tobacco use or injury.

Recent peer-to-peer partnerships include:

- Peru and Bolivia - INLASA Partnership
- Norway and Malawi - Host Workshop and Peer-to-Peer organizational development
- UK and Kenya - Science-to-Policy Expertise
- Canada and Kenya - Study Tour
- Morocco and Togo - Strengthening Information Systems
- UK and Uganda - Communications and Advocacy
- France and Togo - Epidemic Intelligence and Disease Surveillance
- France and Togo/Côte d'Ivoire - Influencing Policy through Publication

== List of IANPHI members ==
1. Afghanistan: Afghan Public Health Institute
2. Albania: Public Health Institute
3. Algeria: Institut National de Santé Publique (INSP)
4. Angola: National Institute of Public Health
5. Argentina: National Laboratories and Health Institutes Administration (ANLIS)
6. Armenia: National Center for Disease Control
7. Armenia: Armenian National Institute of Health
8. Austria: Gesundheit Österreich GmbH (GÖG)
9. Bangladesh: Institute of Epidemiology, Disease Control & Research - IEDCR
10. Belgium: Sciensano
11. Bolivia: Health Laboratories National Institute (INLASA)
12. Brazil: Oswaldo Cruz Foundation - FIOCRUZ
13. Bulgaria: National Center of Public Health and Analyses (NCPHA)
14. Burkina Faso: Institut National de Sante Publique (INSP)
15. Burundi: National Institute of Public Health
16. Cabo Verde: Instituto Nacional de Saúde Pública (INSP)
17. Cambodia: National Institute of Public Health
18. Cameroon: Direction de la Lutte Contre la Maladie, les Épidémies, et les Pandémies (DLM)
19. Canada: Public Health Agency of Canada
20. Canada: Institut national de santé publique du Quebec
21. China: Chinese Center for Disease Control and Prevention
22. China: Centre for Health Protection, Hong Kong
23. Colombia: National Institute of Public Health
24. Costa Rica: National Institute for Research on Nutrition and Health
25. Côte d'Ivoire : National Institute of Public Health
26. Croatia: Croatian Institute for Public Health
27. Cuba: Institute of Tropical Medicine "Pedro Kouri"
28. Czech Republic: National Institute of Public Health
29. Denmark: Statens Institut for Folkesundhed
30. Denmark: Statens Serum Institut (SSI)
31. Ecuador: National Institute of Public Health Research
32. El Salvador: National Institute of Public Health
33. Estonia: National Institute for Health and Development
34. Ethiopia : Ethiopian Public Health Institute
35. Finland: National Institute for Health and Welfare (THL)
36. France: Santé publique France
37. Georgia: Georgia National Center for Disease Control and Public Health (NCDC)
38. Germany: Robert Koch Institute
39. Germany: Bundesinstitut für Öffentliche Gesundheit
40. Ghana: Noguchi Memorial Institute for Medical Research
41. Ghana: Ghana Health Service
42. Guatemala: Centro Nacional de Ciencias de la Salud (CNCS)
43. Guinea: Agence Nationale de Sécurité Sanitaire (ANSS)
44. Guinea: National Institute of Public Health Guinea (Guinea NPHI)
45. Guinea Bissau: National Institute of Public Health (INASA)
46. India: National Centre for Disease Control
47. Iran Islamic Republic: Institute of Public Health Research
48. Ireland: The Institute of Public Health in Ireland
49. Israel: Israel Center for Disease Control
50. Italy: National Institute of Health
51. Jordan: Jordan Ministry of Health
52. Kazakhstan: National Center for Public Healthcare
53. Kenya: Kenya Medical Research Institute (KEMRI)
54. Kenya: Kenya National Public Health Institute
55. Liberia: National Public Health Institute of Liberia (NPHIL)
56. Libya: Libya National Centre for Disease Control
57. Macedonia FYR: Institute for Public Health of the R. Macedonia
58. Madagascar: Ministère de la santé publique
59. Malawi: Public Health Institute of Malawi
60. Mexico: National Institute of Public Health
61. Moldova: National Center of Public Health
62. Mongolia : National Center for Public Health
63. Morocco: Pasteur Institute of Morocco
64. Morocco: National Institute of Hygiene
65. Morocco: Direction of Epidemiology and Disease Control
66. Mozambique: National Institute of Health
67. Myanmar: National Health Laboratory
68. Myanmar: Ministry of Health and Sports
69. Nepal: School of Public Health and Community Medicine B.P. Koirala Institute of Health Sciences
70. Netherlands: Netherlands National Institute for Public Health and the Environment
71. Nigeria: Nigerian Institute of Medical Research (NIMR)
72. Nigeria: Nigeria Centre for Disease Control
73. Nigeria: National Primary Health Care Development Agency
74. Norway: Norwegian Institute of Public Health
75. Pakistan: Pakistan National Institute of Health
76. Palestine: Palestinian National Institute of Public Health
77. Panama: Gorgas Memorial Institute for Health Studies
78. Papua New Guinea: National Department of Health
79. Peru : Peruvian National Institute of Health
80. Poland : National Institute of Public Health
81. Portugal: Institute of Hygiene and Tropical Medicine
82. Portugal: National Institute of Health INSA
83. Republic of Korea: Korea Centers for Disease Control and Prevention
84. Russian Federation: National Medical Research Center for Therapy and Preventive Medicine
85. Rwanda: Institute of HIV/AIDS, Diseases Prevention and Control
86. Saudi Arabia: Centers for Disease Control
87. Serbia: Institute of Public Health of Serbia
88. Sierra Leone: Ministry of Health & Sanitation
89. Slovenia: National Institute of Public Health (NIJZ)
90. Somalia: National Institute of Health (NIH)
91. South Africa: National Institute for Communicable Diseases (NICD)
92. Spain: Carlos III Health Institute (ISCIII, Instituto de Salud Carlos III)
93. Sudan: National Public Health Institute
94. Sweden: Public Health Agency of Sweden
95. Syria: Center for Strategic Health Studies
96. Tanzania: National Institute for Medical Research (NIMR)
97. Thailand: National Institute of Health
98. Timor Leste: National Institute of Public Health
99. Togo: National Institute of Hygiene
100. Tunisia: National Institute of Health
101. Turkey: Refik Saydam Hygiene Center
102. Uganda: Uganda Virus Research Institute UVRI
103. Uganda: Uganda National Institute of Public Health
104. Ukraine: Public Health Center of Ukraine
105. United Kingdom England: Public Health England (PHE)
106. United Kingdom Wales: Public Health Wales
107. United States: Centers for Disease Control and Prevention
108. Vietnam: National Institute of Hygiene and Epidemiology - NIHE
109. Zambia: Zambia National Public Health Institute
110. Zimbabwe: National Public Health Institute

== Organization ==
IANPHI is managed by an executive board and secretariat. Executive board members consider and vote on issues of strategic direction and policy and on project and funding recommendations. There are currently 14 active members on the executive board:

1. Duncan Selbie - IANPHI President, Former Chief Executive, Public Health England, United Kingdom
2. Meerjady Sabrina Flora - IANPHI Vice President, Former Director General, Institute of Epidemiology, Disease Control and Research and National Influenza Center, Bangladesh
3. André van der Zande - Immediate Past President, IANPHI, Former Director General, National Institute for Public Health and the Environment, The Netherlands
4. Martha Lucia Ospina - Director, Instituto Nacional de Salud, Colombia
5. George F. Gao - Director, Chinese Center for Disease Control and Prevention, China
6. Ebba Abate - Director, Ethiopian Public Health Institute (EPHI), Ethiopia
7. Lothar H. Wieler - President, Robert Koch Institute, Germany
8. Juan Rivera Dommarco - Director, Instituto Nacional de Salud Pública, Mexico
9. Camilla Stoltenberg - Director General, Norwegian Institute of Public Health, Norway
10. Akhmetov Valikhan Isaevich - Former Director, National Centre for Public Healthcare, Kazakhstan
11. Abdullah Algwizani - Chief Executive Officer, Saudi Centers for Disease Control, Saudi Arabia
12. Aamer Ikram - Executive Director, National Institute of Health, Pakistan
13. Sabin Nsanzimana - Director General, Rwanda Biomedical Center, Rwanda
14. Markku Tervahauta - Director General, Finnish Institute of Health and Welfare, Finland

Emeritus Members

1. Igbal Abukarig - Director, Public Health Institute, Sudan
2. Paulo Buss - Former President, Oswaldo Cruz Foundation/FIOCRUZ, Brazil
3. Reinhard Burger - President, Robert Koch Institute, Germany
4. David Butler Jones - Director, Public Health Agency of Canada
5. Cesar Cabezas - Director, National Institute of Health, Peru
6. L. S. Chauhan - Director, National Centre for Disease Control, India
7. Rajae El Aouad - Former Director, National Institute of Hygiene, Morocco
8. Naima El Mdaghri - Director General, Institut Pasteur du Maroc, Morocco
9. Mohammed Hassar - Former Director, Institute Pasteur du Maroc, Morocco
10. Mauricio Hernández-Avila - IANPHI Immediate Past President, Former Director, National Institute of Public Health, Mexico
11. Oni Idigbe - Former Director General & Director of Research, Nigerian Institute of Medical Research, Nigeria
12. Ilesh Jani - Director General, National Institute of Health, Mozambique
13. Amha Kebede - Director, Ethiopian Public Health Institute, Ethiopia
14. Jeffrey Koplan, IANPHI Senior Advisor, Vice President for Global Health, Emory University, USA
15. Justin McCracken - Former Chief Executive, Health Protection Agency, United Kingdom
16. Tsehaynesh Messele - Former Director General, Health and Nutrition Research Institute, Ethiopia
17. Pekka Puska - Former IANPHI President, Former Director General, National Institute for Health and Welfare, Finland
18. Mahmudur Rahman - Director, Institute of Epidemiology, Disease Control, and Research, Bangladesh
19. Amabélia Rodrigues - Former President, National Institute of Public Health, Guinea Bissau
20. Mario Henry Rodriguez - Former General Director, National Institute of Public Health, Mexico
21. Pathom Sawanpanyalert - Former Director General, National Institute of Health
22. Barry Schoub - Former Executive Director, National Institute of Communicable Diseases, South Africa
23. Marc Sprenger - Director, European Centre for Disease Prevention and Control, Netherlands
24. Geir Stene-Larsen - Director General, Norwegian Institute of Public Health
25. Gregory Taylor - Chief Public Health Officer, Public Health Agency of Canada, Canada
26. Jaroslav Volf - Former Director, National Institute of Public Health, Czech Republic
27. Yu Wang - Director-General, Centers for Disease Control, China
28. Jane Wilde - Former Chief Executive, Institute of Public Health in Ireland

The IANPHI Secretariat is based at the Santé Publique France, and the US Office is located at the Emory University Global Health Institute in Atlanta, GA.

== IANPHI long-term projects ==
IANPHI's long-term projects help public health systems in low-resource countries respond to modern public health challenges, improve outcomes, and support healthy populations and strong economies. These intensive multi-year engagements develop and strengthen national public health institutes (NPHIs), moving them forward on a continuum from those least developed to those with a comprehensive and coordinated scope of public health responsibilities. Currently, IANPHI has ongoing long-term projects in Bangladesh, Ethiopia, Ghana, Guinea-Bissau, Malawi, Morocco, Mozambique, Nigeria, Tanzania, and Togo.

== See also ==
- List of national public health agencies
