= Duncan Selbie =

British government official (born 1962)

Duncan Selbie (born 1962/3) is a British government official who is a senior advisor to the Department of Health and Social Care on global and public health. He was Chief Executive of Public Health England from its foundation in 2013 until he was removed in August 2020 by the Govt which in 2021 formed it into the UK Health Security Agency. Since December 2020, he has been president of the International Association of National Public Health Institutes.

Previously, from 2007 to 2012 he was Chief Executive of Brighton and Sussex University Hospitals NHS Trust, and earlier South West London and St George's Mental Health NHS Trust. He joined the NHS in 1980, as a teenager.

== Views ==
On appointment to his PHE role, Selbie said he did not claim to have deep public health experience, but did have wide experience within the NHS.

He is an advocate of local government's role in improving the public's health, saying that local experts are best placed to identify where their most vulnerable people are.

He is also reported to believe that health policy should not be viewed in a silo because economic, educational, and social factors are key to improving health inequalities. He said "Good health is about having a good place to live, with a decent home, a job and friends". He regards health as being “inextricably linked to work” and is reported to have said “People in work generally have better health”.

As part of a drive to make hospitals healthier, Selbie has called for a 'tobacco-free' NHS, with a blanket ban on smoking on their grounds.

== PHE initiatives ==
Public Health England recommended a range of measures to solve the problem of childhood obesity. In March 2016 when former Chancellor George Osborne announced a tax on sugary drinks Selbie said “A sugary drinks levy is fabulous news for children and families in helping them to cut back on sugar. This will reduce the risks of obesity, tooth decay and other life-threatening diseases.”

== Influence ==
In December 2013 the Health Service Journal rated Selbie as the 33rd most powerful person in the English NHS.

== Pay ==
As of 2015, Selbie was paid a salary of between £185,000 and £189,999 by the department, making him one of the 328 most highly paid people in the British public sector at that time.
