= Nigeria Centre for Disease Control =

National Public Health Institute of the Federal Republic of Nigeria

Nigeria Centre for Disease Prevention
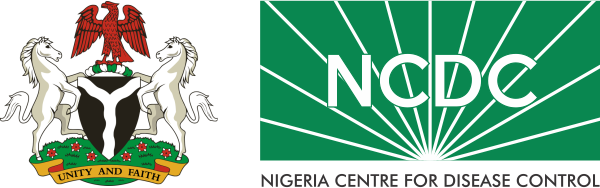
- Abbreviation: NCDC
- Founder: Federal Government of Nigeria
- Type: National Public Health Institute
- Headquarters: Ebitu Ukiwe Street, Jabi, Abuja, Federal Capital Territory.
- Region served: Nigeria
- Owner: Federal Republic of Nigeria
- Key people: Dr. Jide Idris
- Employees: 500+
- Website: Official website

The Nigeria Centre for Disease Control and Prevention (NCDC) is the national public health institute for Nigeria. It is a federal government agency under the Federal Ministry of Health (Nigeria), with its headquarters in Abuja, Federal Capital Territory.

The agency's goal is to protect Nigerians from the impact of communicable diseases through the coordination of public health preparedness, surveillance, laboratory, and response functions for all infectious diseases. The NCDC targets its activities towards the prevention and control of diseases of public health importance. This includes the preparedness, detection and response to public health emergencies, research, training and knowledge management, health promotion and other activities to protect the health of Nigerians.

The NCDC serves as Nigeria's International Health Regulations National Focal Point and is a member of the International Association of National Public Health Institutes.

== History ==
=== Establishment ===
The NCDC was established in 2011, following a mandate from the Permanent Secretary of the Federal Ministry of Health (Nigeria), to integrate specific units of the Ministry to serve as the foundation of the agency - the Epidemiology Division, the Avian Influenza Project, and the Nigeria Field Epidemiology and Laboratory Training Program (NFELTP).

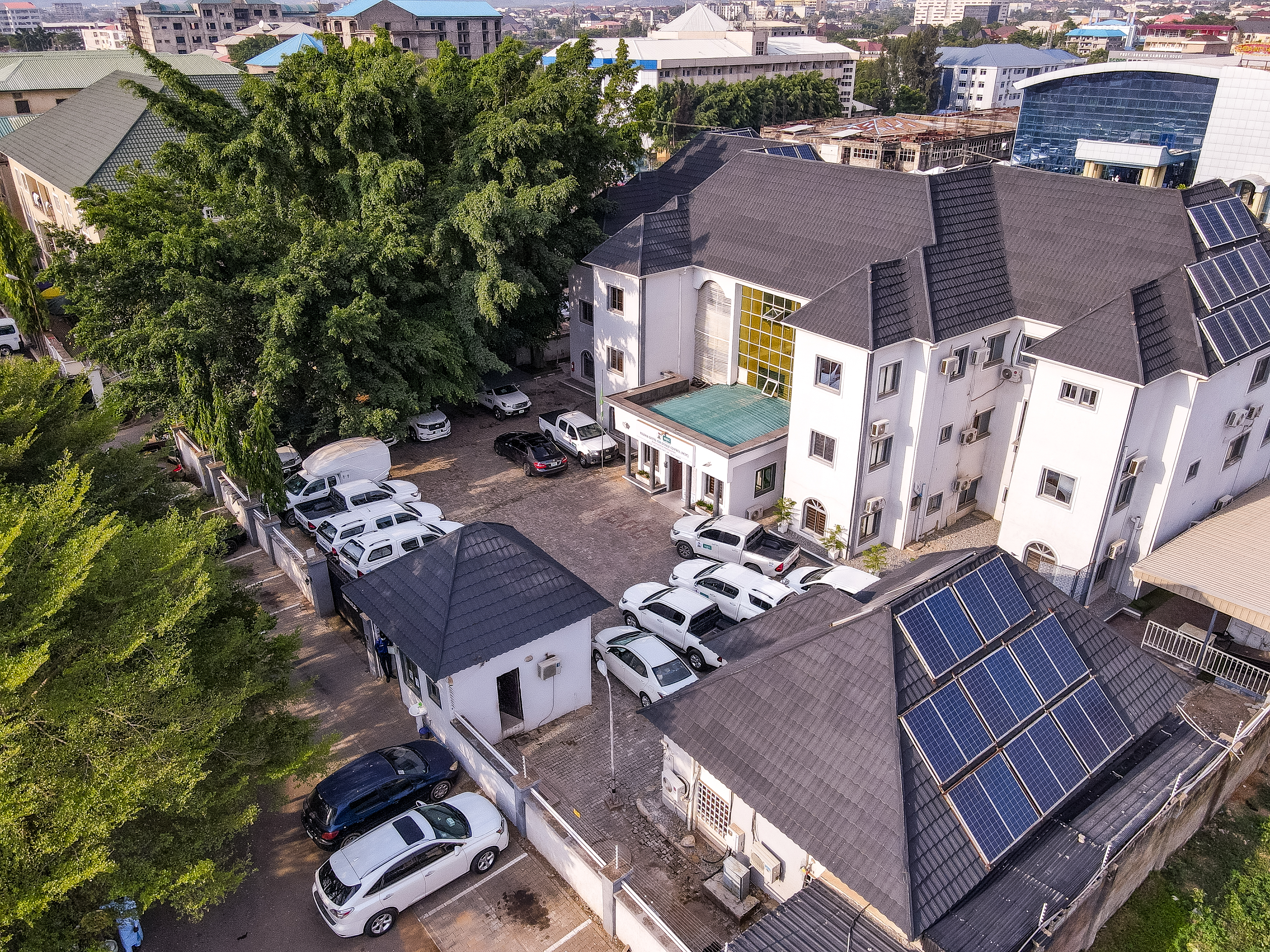
Front view of the NCDC Headquarters

Prior to this, the request for the establishment of NCDC was endorsed in 2007 at the 51st National Council on Health. The Council recognized the need for a technical agency to respond to the challenges of public health emergencies in Nigeria and to enhance the country's preparedness for epidemics I through the prevention, detection, and control of communicable diseases. The NCDC is modelled after the United States Centers for Disease Control and Prevention. Examples of epidemics that occurred before the inception of NCDC include the yellow fever epidemic in 1986 and 1987, the meningococcal meningitis epidemic in 1996, and cholera outbreaks in 2001 and 2004.

=== Growth ===
On 15 March 2017, the Bill supporting the formal establishment of the NCDC was approved by the Federal Executive Council. This was presented to the 8th National Assembly (Nigeria) as an Executive Bill. Following deliberations by the National Assembly and approval, President Muhammadu Buhari signed the Bill for an Act to establish the NCDC as a federal government agency on 13 November 2018. The Nigeria Centre for Disease Control and Prevention Establishment Act 2018 gives NCDC the mandate to promote, coordinate, and facilitate the prevention, detection, and control of communicable diseases in Nigeria and other events of public health importance.

To provide a framework for the strategic implementation of activities, the NCDC Strategy and Implementation Plan 2017–2021 was launched on 21 November 2017. The NCDC Vision and Mission Statement were created to guide the key activities outlined in the 2017–2021 strategic plan. The Mission Statement was further broken down into 5 strategic goals with defined outcomes, 22 objectives, and 89 corresponding activities to support the multiple initiatives of the 2017–2021 horizon. A three-day review process took place for internal and external stakeholders to identify the successes and challenges that require addressing and to identify and prioritise activities to execute in the subsequent years.

== Organization ==
=== Location of campuses ===
There are three campuses within the NCDC in Nigeria, located in Abuja, Federal Capital Territory, and Yaba, Lagos State.

- NCDC Headquarters in Jabi, Abuja
- NCDC National Reference Laboratory in Gaduwa, Abuja
- NCDC Central Public Health Laboratory in Yaba, Lagos

=== Organisational structure ===
The NCDC, led by a director-general, is composed of seven departments: Surveillance and Epidemiology, Public Health Laboratory Services (PHL), Health Emergency Preparedness and Response (HEPR), Planning, Research and Statistics, Administration & Human Resources, Subnational and Finance & Accounts. Each department is headed by a director, alongside deputy directors. All directors report directly to the director-general.

The Special Duties Directorate, coordinates strategic initiatives, fostering partnerships, and overseeing project management activities. The directorate is responsible for monitoring strategic organizational plans, manages engagement with partners and Ministries, Departments and Agencies (MDAs).

The Directorate of Surveillance and Epidemiology collects, collates, and analyses data on Nigeria's priority diseases to detect outbreaks and inform policy. It ensures the implementation of the Integrated Disease Surveillance and Response (IDSR) strategy which include indicator-based and event-based surveillance system, that detects and verifies rumours related to diseases and outbreaks. The Directorate also hosts the IHR desk on behalf of the agency.

The Directorate of Public Health Laboratory Services maintains and manages the NCDC's national and reference laboratories and network of public health laboratories. It provides diagnostic services for Nigeria's diseases of public health importance like [[viral hemorrhagic fevers]], meningitis, cholera, measles, yellow fever, rubella, COVID-19, and others. The Directorate also coordinates and manages the National Public Health Laboratory Information Management System (LIMS) for Nigeria. The NRL currently conducts sample testing for Yellow fever, Influenza, Cholera, CSM, Lassa fever, Monkeypox, Measles, Rubella, HIV, SARS-CoV-2 and other pathogens.

The Directorate of Health Emergency Preparedness and Response is responsible for the mitigation of emergencies and the management of their impact. It builds capacity by advocating and sensitizing emergency preparedness and response. The Directorate also provides primary and secondary outbreak response activities through Rapid Response Teams. Its Public Health Emergency Operations Centre (PHEOC) was established during the 2016/2017 meningitis outbreak in Nigeria. It supports the coordination of outbreak response activities in the country.

The Directorate of Planning, Research & Statistics, previously known as Prevention Programs and Knowledge Management, develops health promotion and disease prevention plans that address endemic infectious and non-communicable diseases. The Directorate mainly conducts research to support evidence-based policies and practices. The Directorate also manages the Nigeria Field Epidemiology Training Program.

The Directorate of Administration and Human Resources oversees the management of human and material resources of the NCDC. It is organized into two sub-divisions: Human Resources and General Services. Human Resources is responsible for employee-related activities such as recruitment/appointment, promotion, training, and staff welfare. General Services is accountable for the management and maintenance of all the NCDC's assets.

The Directorate of Finance and Accounts is responsible for all financial and accounting activities of the NCDC. It operates under the Nigerian accounting standards, as approved by the Accountant General of the Federation, which are in line with the Nigeria Public Service Reforms and the International Public Sector Accounting Standards.

The Subnational Support Directorate is responsible for supporting public health activities at the subnational level (State and Local Government Area). The team leads and supports the establishment of subnational Public Health Emergency Operations Centre (PHEOC), coordinates the network of PHEOCs, builds capacity, advocates, sensitizes and monitors all PHEOCs and Laboratory network at subnational level.

== Workforce ==
As of 2021, the NCDC has over 500 staff members who work across its three campuses. Several of its employees have at least one degree in the bachelor's, master's, or doctoral level.

The various job roles at NCDC are in line with Nigeria's public service rules and include Surveillance and Epidemiology Officer,Medical laboratory Scientist, Data Officer/Manager, Research Coordinator, Program Officer/Manager, Health Communicator, Response Officer, Scientific Officer, and Project Coordinator.

In addition to full-time employment, the NCDC also offers positions for short-term consultancies, internships, and fellowships for applicants worldwide throughout various times of each year.

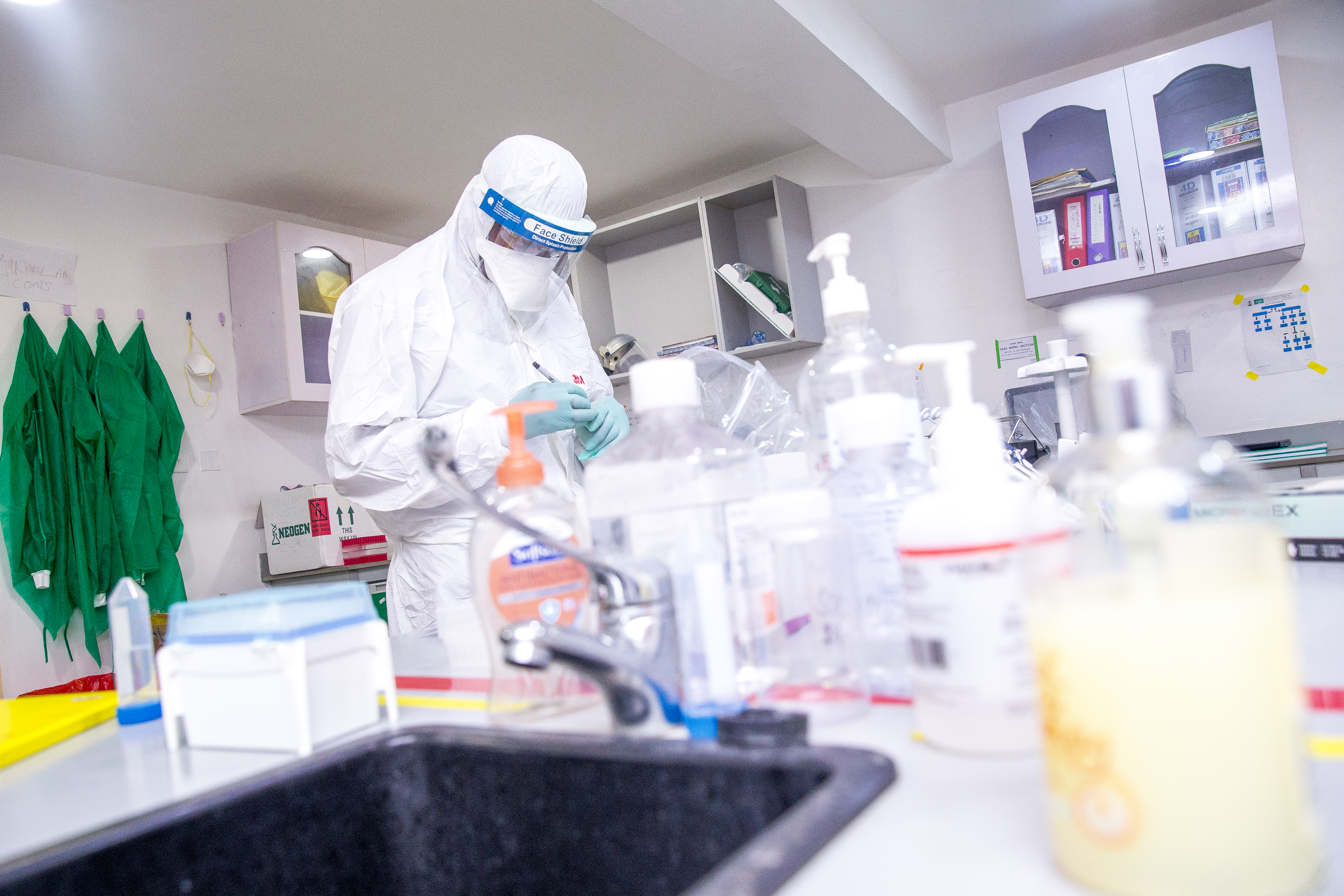
A lab scientist labelling a cryovial tube to aliquot suspected COVID-19 sample at the NCDC National Reference Laboratory

=== Nigeria Field Epidemiology Training Program (NFETP) ===
The Nigeria Field Epidemiology Training Program (NFETP) is a two-year field-based training and service program in applied epidemiology and public health that helps participants to build their capacity in strengthening disease surveillance and response systems. It trains medical epidemiology residents, public health laboratory residents, and veterinary epidemiology residents for leadership positions nationally and globally. There are over 300 graduates of the program working in public health across Nigeria.

It is managed by NCDC in partnership with the African Field Epidemiology Network and with support from the United States Centers for Disease Control and Prevention.

Since 2016, the NCDC and NFETP have held a yearly annual scientific conference in Abuja. It has provided a platform for experts in the epidemiology field to convey new knowledge to advance public health science. In 2021, the conference was renamed the 'Nigerian Conference of Applied and Field Epidemiology' (NICAFE).

Graduates and residents of the NFETP are involved at the strategic, technical, and operational levels in the response to epidemic-prone and pandemic-prone diseases. They operate under various roles to serve different capacities within contact tracing, risk communications, infection prevention and control, surveillance, and coordination.

== Leadership ==
=== Director-general ===
The director-general of the NCDC is a senior-level position that is appointed by the president of the Federal Republic of Nigeria. It must be occupied by a health professional who has at least 15 years of postgraduate qualification experience in the relevant fields of medicine or public health. The director-general is appointed under the following conditions:

- Serve as the chief executive officer of the centre and be responsible for the administration of the centre.
- Receive supervision of the governing board of the centre and the honourable minister of health.
- Shall hold office for a term of 4 years and be eligible for re-appointment for another term of 4 years and no more on such terms and conditions as may be determined by the president of Nigeria on the recommendation by the honourable Minister of Health.

Since 19 February 2024, Dr. Jide Idris has served as the director-general of the NCDC. In a statement issued by the presidential spokesman, on the appointment of Dr. Jide Idris into office by President Bola Tinubu on 15 February 2024.

=== Past leadership ===
Professor Abdulsalami Nasidi - National Coordinator/CEO 2014 - 2016

Dr. Chikwe Ihekweazu - National Coordinator/CEO 15 August 2016 - July, 2019

Dr. Chikwe Ihekweazu - Director General July, 2019 - 18 October 2021

Dr. Ifedayo Adetifa - Director General 18 October 2021 – 19 February 2024

=== Heads of departments ===
Under the office of the director-general, there are six heads of hepartments who represent each directorate of the NCDC.

== Datasets and survey systems ==
=== NCDC Weekly Epidemiological Report ===
The Department of Surveillance and Epidemiology produces and publishes a 'Weekly Epidemiological Report' on the NCDC website weekly. The report provides a summary of key infectious diseases in Nigeria, showcasing data of case activities (e.g. the number of suspected cases, the number of confirmed cases, the number of deaths, the number of States and LGAs affected and the case fatality rate) within the previous week and year-to-date. Diseases of importance include Yellow fever, Measles, Cholera, Lassa fever, Cerebrospinal Meningitis (CSM), Acute Flaccid Paralysis, and the National Influenza Sentinel Surveillance (NISS). The WER includes an editorial that highlights key activities and events that occurred at the NCDC within the previous week of the posting date.

=== National Disease Outbreak Dashboard ===
Located on the NCDC website, the National Disease Outbreak Dashboard is an interactive dashboard that provides users with case-based data on Nigeria's prioritized infectious diseases from 2006 to date. Diseases include Cholera, CSM, Lassa fever, Measles, Monkeypox, and yellow fever. A detailed map of Nigeria displays every State and LGA in the country, alongside an interactive line chart. Data displayed on the dashboard include the number of confirmed cases by year, the names and number of affected States, the names and number of affected LGAs, and the percentage of case victims based on gender.

=== Coronavirus COVID-19 Website ===
The NCDC collects, analyses, and publishes national COVID-19 updates for Nigeria daily. The COVID-19 dashboard features cumulative and State-specified figures of samples tested, active cases, confirmed cases, discharged cases, and deaths. A comprehensive situation report about Nigeria's COVID-19 response is also uploaded on the website weekly.

The website also has a laboratory directory composed of government-owned and private laboratories in Nigeria that are accredited to conduct COVID-19 testing, and other policies/guidelines for the response. The website also has a laboratory directory composed of government-owned and private laboratories in Nigeria that are accredited to conduct COVID-19 testing and other policies/guidelines for the response.

=== Public Health Emergency Operation Centre ===
In 2017, NCDC established a national Public Health Emergency Operations Centre (PHEOC) as the Incident Coordination Centre. It currently serves as Nigeria's public health intelligence and response coordination hub by supporting disease detection and the coordination of information resources during public health events.

Since 2018, NCDC has been supporting all 36 States and the Federal Capital territory to establish State-level PHEOCs to effectively promote communication and resource management on a State-wide level during public health emergencies. Towards the end of 2020, 34 states in Nigeria have established a PHEOC, supported by NCDC. The NCDC supports the State PHEOCs through training, mentorship, and regular simulations.

=== Turn Nigeria Orange Project ===
The Infection Prevention and Control (IPC) Unit housed under the PPKM Directorate is responsible for disseminating information on the standard precautions of preventing and controlling infections. The Unit mainly based its activities to the safety of health care practitioners and the general population by strengthening IPC capacity in Nigeria.

In 2019, NCDC launched the 'Turn Nigeria Orange' project, a comprehensive five-year program that aims to support Nigerian healthcare facilities and initiate IPC programs. The program has supported the establishment of the Orange Network, a network of dedicated tertiary health facilities in Nigeria that aim to transform into centre of excellence in infection prevention and control.

=== National Action Plan for Antimicrobial Resistance 2017–2022 ===
On 26 November 2016, the honourable Minister of Health approved the establishment of a National Antimicrobial Resistance (AMR) coordinating body at the NCDC. This action was in response to WHO Member States' commitment to developing multi-sectoral national action plans based on the WHO Global Action Plan on AMR. It also positioned the NCDC to serve as the lead representative for coordinating AMR control in Nigeria. Members of the AMR coordinating body inaugurated on 16 and 17 January 2017 to review Nigeria's requirement for its National Action Plan for AMR.

Launched in May 2017, the National Action Plan for AMR outlines the implementation of strategic and operational activities to ensure measurable containment of AMR in Nigeria. The Plan's objectives was formed through a SWOT analysis of the AMR condition in Nigeria. Recommendations on AMR containment were based on the five strategic objectives outlined in the Global Action Plan on AMR. Since its inception, the plan has guided the NCDC's advisory and campaign efforts of promoting the responsible use of antibiotics to Nigerian citizens.

=== Surveillance and Outbreak Response Management and Analysis System ===
The NCDC adopted the Surveillance and Outbreak Response Management and Analysis System (SORMAS) in October 2017. SORMAS is a digital system for comprehensive disease surveillance. The multifunctional tool has assisted the NCDC in performing outbreak management response tasks by contact tracing, laboratory data management, and rumor management.

During the 2017–2019 monkeypox outbreak in Nigeria, the NCDC utilized SORMAS to conduct contact tracing for case notification and analyze data for the production of weekly epidemiological reports on the epidemic for the general public. By September 2020, SORMAS was fully deployed and adopted by all States and the Federal Capital Territory in prioritized health facilities for reporting use. The SORMAS team at the NCDC conducts training in the States to teach surveillance officers the use of the system for enhanced surveillance and outbreak response on epidemic-prone diseases.

== COVID-19 ==
The first confirmed case of COVID-19 in Nigeria was discovered at the Mainland Infectious Disease Hospital, Yaba, on 27 February 2020. Before the arrival of the index case, the NCDC had developed various measures to prevent the entry of COVID-19 into the country and to detect its presence on arrival. Some of the measures included increasing surveillance at ports of entry through body temperature measurements, collecting the contact details of travelers arriving from COVID-19 hotspots, and using SORMAS and the Mobile Strengthening and Outbreak Response Management System (MSERS) for case-cased reporting and aggregate reporting of suspected cases respectively.

The NCDC established a multi-sectoral National Coronavirus Preparedness Group (NCPG) on 26 January 2020 to execute regular epidemic intelligence gathering, intensive risk communications, and strengthening of laboratory capacity for testing in preparation for the disease. It then transitioned into a PHEOC on 28 February 2021, when the first case in Nigeria was detected. The PHEOC promptly developed an incident action plan to coordinate NCDC's COVID-19 response activities across key response areas of coordination, epidemiology and surveillance, laboratory, IPC, case management, risk communication, logistics and several others. State PHEOCs also adopted the pillars to increase response efforts in controlling COVID-19 within their respective States.

The first COVID-19 case in Nigeria prompted President Muhammadu Buhari to establish the Presidential Steering Committee (PSC) on COVID-19, formally known as the Presidential Task Force (PTF) on COVID-19, on 9 March 2020. The director-general represents the NCDC as a member of the PSC by supporting the implementation of multi-sectoral activities. With oversight from the PSC, the NCDC leads the national public health response on COVID-19 in Nigeria. The NCDC's role in the PSC has contributed to the execution of several measures such as the compulsory use of face masks in public settings, temporary closure and safe re-opening of National Youth Service Corps orientation camps, temporary closure and safe re-opening of airports for domestic and international travel, temporary closure and safe re-opening of educational institutions, and restriction of large gatherings. During the onset of the COVID-19 pandemic in Nigeria, the NCDC supported the deployment of Rapid Response Teams in States and the Federal Capital Territory to support case tracking. 52 Rapid Response Teams were deployed to several States in 2020.

The NCDC rapidly increased the testing capacity in Nigeria by scaling up diagnostic testing of COVID-19 nationwide for accessibility. By March 2020, only five laboratories in the NCDC molecular laboratory network could diagnose COVID-19 in Nigeria: the NRL, Virology Laboratory of Lagos University Teaching Hospital, Irru Specialist Teaching Hospital, Nigerian Institute of Medical Research, and African Centre of Excellence for Genomics of Infectious Diseases. Nearly a year later, NCDC supported the activation for every State in Nigeria to have at least one public health laboratory that conducts COVID-19 testing. The NCDC has also promoted the use of the GeneXpert System to further scale up diagnostic activities nationwide. Alongside several partners, the NCDC reported the first genome sequence of SARS-CoV-2 from Africa from the first confirmed case of COVID-19 in Nigeria.

SORMAS has been leveraged at the NCDC to support COVID-19 contact tracing and disease surveillance at State and national levels. By October 2020, 80% of Nigeria's States reported 90% of their contacts traced, and 35% of States reported a contact-to-case ratio of more than 5. The NCDC also supported SORMAS training for epidemiologists in various treatment Centres and Laboratories across the nation.

The NCDC and the Federal Ministry of Health, in collaboration with Tertiary Education Trust Fund and National Universities Commission, established the Nigeria COVID-19 Research Coalition, a national platform to coordinate the generation of evidence-based research to support Nigeria's response to the COVID-19 pandemic. The research coalition currently has a membership of over 40 institutions. Members of the NCDC have collaborated with partnering institutions to produce several research manuscripts about the COVID-19 response in Nigeria.

In collaboration with Port Health Services of the Federal Ministry of Health (Nigeria), the NCDC hosts and manages the Nigeria International Travel Portal. The platform regulates mandatory testing for international travelers departing from or arriving in Nigeria. It also aids Nigeria in contact tracing and surveillance at international borders to detect COVID-19 cases.

As of June 2021, the NCDC has developed over 60 guidelines relating to COVID-19 for the population of Nigeria. The NCDC actively disseminates relevant information on the COVID-19 pandemic through its website, SMS messaging platform, and social media accounts. Daily statistics of COVID-19 in Nigeria are published by the NCDC on all of its online platforms and third-party applications.

== Publications ==
- "Nigeria Centre for Disease Control".
- "Nigeria Centre for Disease Control".
- "Nigeria Centre for Disease Control".
- Njidda, Ahmad Muhammad; Oyebanji, Oyeronke; Obasanya, Joshua; Ojo, Olubunmi; Adedeji, Adebayo; Mba, Nwando; Oladejo, John; Ihekweazu, Chikwe (April 2018). "The Nigeria Centre for Disease Control". BMJ Global Health. 3 (2) e000712. doi:10.1136/bmjgh-2018-000712. PMC 5914765. PMID 29707246.
- Dan-Nwafor, Chioma; Ochu, Chinwe Lucia; Elimian, Kelly; Oladejo, John; Ilori, Elsie; Umeokonkwo, Chukwuma; Steinhardt, Laura; Igumbor, Ehimario; Wagai, John; Okwor, Tochi; Aderinola, Olaolu; Mba, Nwando; Hassan, Assad; Dalhat, Mahmood; Jinadu, Kola; Badaru, Sikiru; Arinze, Chinedu; Jafiya, Abubakar; Disu, Yahya; Saleh, Fatima; Abubakar, Anwar; Obiekea, Celestina; Yinka-Ogunleye, Adesola; Naidoo, Dhamari; Namara, Geoffrey; Muhammad, Saleh; Ipadeola, Oladipupo; Ofoegbunam, Chinenye; Ogunbode, Oladipo; Akatobi, Charles; Alagi, Matthias; Yashe, Rimamdeyati; Crawford, Emily; Okunromade, Oyeladun; Aniaku, Everistus; Mba, Sandra; Agogo, Emmanuel; Olugbile, Michael; Eneh, Chibuzo; Ahumibe, Anthony; Nwachukwu, William; Ibekwe, Priscilla; Adejoro, Ope-Oluwa; Ukponu, Winifred; Olayinka, Adebola; Okudo, Ifeanyi; Aruna, Olusola; Yusuf, Fatima; Alex-Okoh, Morenike; Fawole, Temidayo; Alaka, Akeem; Muntari, Hassan; Yennan, Sebastian; Atteh, Rhoda; Balogun, Muhammad; Waziri, Ndadilnasiya; Ogunniyi, Abiodun; Ebhodaghe, Blessing; Lokossou, Virgile; Abudulaziz, Mohammed; Adebiyi, Bimpe; Abayomi, Akin; Abudus-Salam, Ismail; Omilabu, Sunday; Lawal, Lukman; Kawu, Mohammed; Muhammad, Basheer; Tsanyawa, Aminu; Soyinka, Festus; Coker, Tomi; Alabi, Olaniran; Joannis, Tony; Dalhatu, Ibrahim; Swaminathan, Mahesh; Salako, Babatunde; Abubakar, Ibrahim; Fiona, Braka; Nguku, Patrick; Aliyu, Sani H; Ihekweazu, Chikwe (December 2020). "Nigeria's public health response to the COVID-19 pandemic: January to May 2020". Journal of Global Health. 10 (2) 020399. doi:10.7189/jogh.10.020399. PMC 7696244. PMID 33274062.
- Elimian, K. O.; Ochu, C. L.; Ilori, E.; Oladejo, J.; Igumbor, E.; Steinhardt, L.; Wagai, J.; Arinze, C.; Ukponu, W.; Obiekea, C.; Aderinola, O.; Crawford, E.; Olayinka, A.; Dan-Nwafor, C.; Okwor, T.; Disu, Y.; Yinka-Ogunleye, A.; Kanu, N. E.; Olawepo, O. A.; Aruna, O.; Michael, C. A.; Dunkwu, L.; Ipadeola, O.; Naidoo, D.; Umeokonkwo, C. D.; Matthias, A.; Okunromade, O.; Badaru, S.; Jinadu, A.; Ogunbode, O.; Egwuenu, A.; Jafiya, A.; Dalhat, M.; Saleh, F.; Ebhodaghe, G. B.; Ahumibe, A.; Yashe, R. U.; Atteh, R.; Nwachukwu, W. E.; Ezeokafor, C.; Olaleye, D.; Habib, Z.; Abdus-Salam, I.; Pembi, E.; John, D.; Okhuarobo, U. J.; Assad, H.; Gandi, Y.; Muhammad, B.; Nwagwogu, C.; Nwadiuto, I.; Sulaiman, K.; Iwuji, I.; Okeji, A.; Thliza, S.; Fagbemi, S.; Usman, R.; Mohammed, A. A.; Adeola-Musa, O.; Ishaka, M.; Aketemo, U.; Kamaldeen, K.; Obagha, C. E.; Akinyode, A. O.; Nguku, P.; Mba, N.; Ihekweazu, C. (2020). "Descriptive epidemiology of coronavirus disease 2019 in Nigeria, 27 February–6 June 2020". Epidemiology and Infection. 148: e208. doi:10.1017/S095026882000206X. PMC 7506173. PMID 32912370.
- Olayinka, Adebola Tolulope; Nwafor, Chioma Dan; Akano, Adejoke; Jan, Kamji; Ebhodaghe, Blessing; Elimian, Kelly; Ochu, Chinwe; Okwor, Tochi; Ipadeola, Oladipupo; Ukponu, Winifred; Okudo, Ifeanyi; Peter, Clement; Ilori, Elsie; Ihekweazu, Chikwe (2020). "Research as a pillar of Lassa fever emergency response: lessons from Nigeria". Pan African Medical Journal. 37: 179. doi:10.11604/pamj.2020.37.179.26425. PMC 7778227. PMID 33447334.
- Ipadeola, Oladipupo; Furuse, Yuki; Ilori, Elsie A.; Dan-Nwafor, Chioma C.; Akabike, Kachikwulu O.; Ahumibe, Anthony; Ukponu, Winifred; Bakare, Lawal; Joseph, Gbenga; Saleh, Muhammad; Muwanguzi, Esther Namukose; Olayinka, Adebola; Namara, Geoffrey; Naidoo, Dhamari; Iniobong, Akanimo; Amedu, Michael; Ugbogulu, Nkem; Makava, Favour; Adeoye, Olawunmi; Uzoho, Chukwuemeka; Anueyiagu, Chimezie; Okwor, Tochi J.; Mba, Nwando G.; Akano, Adejoke; Ogunniyi, Abiodun; Mohammed, Amina; Adeyemo, Ayodele; Ugochukwu, Dike K.; Agogo, Emmanuel; Ihekweazu, Chikwe (May 2020). "Epidemiology and case-control study of Lassa fever outbreak in Nigeria from 2018 to 2019". Journal of Infection. 80 (5): 578–606. doi:10.1016/j.jinf.2019.12.020. PMID 31926184. S2CID 210158619.
- Okunromade, Oyeladun Funmi; Lokossou, Virgil K.; Anya, Ike; Dada, Augustine Olajide; Njidda, Ahmad M.; Disu, Yahya O.; Dalhat, Mahmood Muazu; Brito, Carlos Faria De; Balogun, Muhammad Shakir; Nguku, Patrick; Ojo, Olubunmi Eyitayo; Ihekweazu, Chikwe; Okolo, Stanley (1 December 2019). "Performance of the Public Health System During a Full-Scale Yellow Fever Simulation Exercise in Lagos State, Nigeria, in 2018: How Prepared Are We for the Next Outbreak?". Health Security. 17 (6): 485–494. doi:10.1089/hs.2019.0048. PMID 31859573. S2CID 209424592.
- Elimian, Kelly Osezele; Musah, Anwar; Mezue, Somto; Oyebanji, Oyeronke; Yennan, Sebastian; Jinadu, Arisekola; Williams, Nanpring; Ogunleye, Adesola; Fall, Ibrahima Soce; Yao, Michel; Eteng, Womi-Eteng; Abok, Patrick; Popoola, Michael; Chukwuji, Martin; Omar, Linda Haj; Ekeng, Eme; Balde, Thieno; Mamadu, Ibrahim; Adeyemo, Ayodele; Namara, Geoffrey; Okudo, Ifeanyi; Alemu, Wondimagegnehu; Peter, Clement; Ihekweazu, Chikwe (December 2019). "Descriptive epidemiology of cholera outbreak in Nigeria, January–November, 2018: implications for the global roadmap strategy". BMC Public Health. 19 (1): 1264. doi:10.1186/s12889-019-7559-6. PMC 6743111. PMID 31519163.
