= Republic Institute for Health Protection =

Public health agency of North Macedonia

The Republic Institute for Health Protection (Macedonian: Институтот за јавно здравје на Република, romanized: Institutot za javno zdravje na Republika) is the national public health agency of the Republic of North Macedonia. It was founded in 1924. It is legally responsible for monitoring the health of the population and infectious diseases and for advising the Ministry of Health. It has more than 200 employees.
