= National public health institute =

Type of governmental organization

National public health institutes (NPHIs) are science-based governmental organizations that serve as a focal point for a country's public health efforts, as well as a critical component of global disease prevention and response systems. Among the better known NPHIs are the United States Centers for Disease Control and Prevention, and the Chinese Center for Disease Control and Prevention.

Typical core functions of NPHIs include surveillance for diseases and injuries, as well as risk factors; epidemiologic investigations of health problems; public health research; and response to public health emergencies. Recent public health challenges, such as the COVID-19 pandemic, may have significant impacts on the missions and structures of NPHIs. Although these functions are in many countries dispersed among several agencies, in recent years some countries have reorganized their public health systems to consolidate functions. For example, following the outbreak of severe acute respiratory syndrome (SARS) in 2003, the Canadian government created the Public Health Agency of Canada in order to ensure a more efficient and effective response in future outbreaks.

== International Association ==
The International Association of National Public Health Institutes (IANPHI) is a member organization of NPHIs that in the end of 2019 had members from 99 countries, benefitting more than 5 billion people. IANPHI helps link the NPHIs of the world, so that they can share knowledge and experiences, in addition to providing support for NPHI development in low-resources countries. The majority of funding for IANPHI comes from the Bill and Melinda Gates Foundation.

== See also ==
- List of national public health agencies
- Burnet Institute (Australia)
- Canadian Institute of Public Health Inspectors
- Instituto Oswaldo Cruz (Brazil)
- Institute of Public Health (Bangladesh)
- Peruvian National Institute of Health
- National Institute of Public Health of Japan
- National Institutes of Health (United States)
- National Public Health Institute of Finland
- National Public Health Organization of Greece
- Netherlands National Institute for Public Health and the Environment
- Norwegian Institute of Public Health
- Palestinian National Institute of Public Health
- People's Republic of China#Public health and environment
- Indian Institutes of Public Health
- Public Health Agency of Sweden
- Robert Koch Institute (Germany)
- UK Health Security Agency
- Sciensano (Belgium)
