= Institut für Integrierte Produktion Hannover =

German research company

Coordinates: 52°24′54″N 9°37′59″E

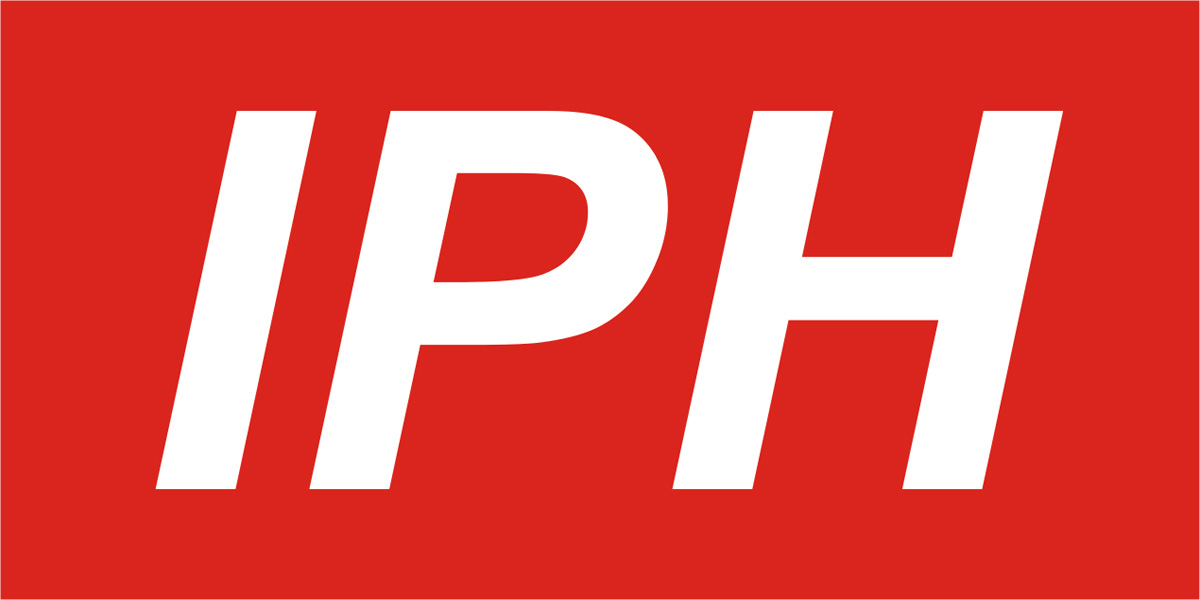
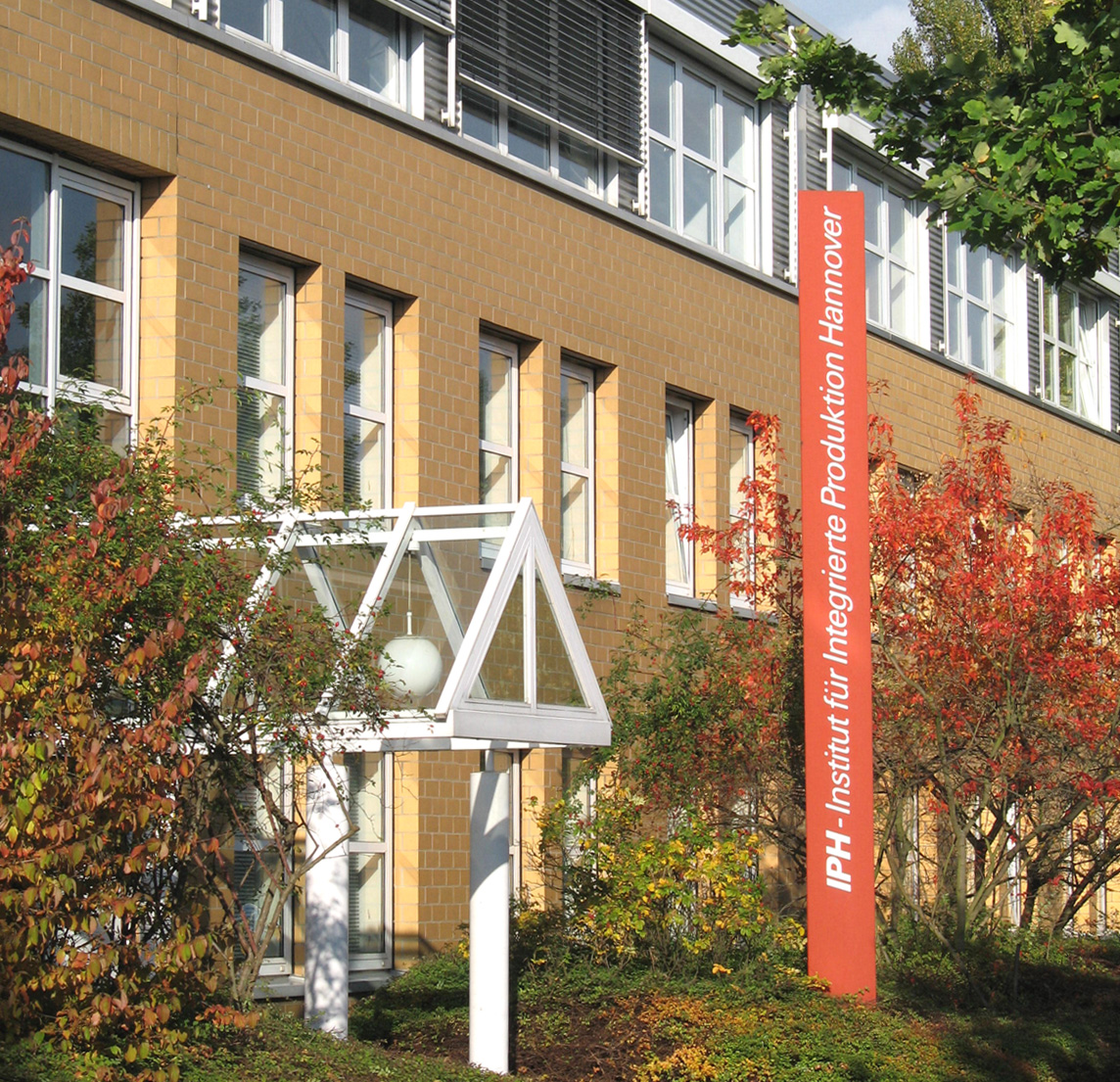
- Type: limited liability company
- Founded: 1988
- Founders: Hans Kurt Toenshoff, Eckart Doege, and Hans-Peter Wiendahl
- Headquarters: Hanover, Germany
- Products: consulting, research & development, training
- Number of employees: 69 (as of December 31, 2010)
- Website: iph-hannover.de/en/

Institut für Integrierte Produktion Hannover (IPH), which literally translates as "Hanover institute of integrated production", is a non-profit limited company providing research and development, consulting, and training in industrial engineering.

== History ==
On January 1, 1988, three German engineering professors founded IPH as a spin-off company of Leibniz University Hannover. As the non-profit company dealt with computer-integrated manufacturing, it was originally called “CIM-Fabrik Hannover” (CIM factory of Hanover). The name was later changed to IPH – Institut für Integrierte Produktion Hannover.

In 1991, the company and its 26 employees moved from the inner city to “Wissenschaftspark” in Marienwerder, in the Northwest of Hanover. To create room for an increasing number of employees, the company building was extended just eight years later.

The death of professor Eckart Doege, co-founder and managing partner of the IPH, in 2004 marked the end of an era. Bernd-Arno Behrens, professor of forming at Leibniz University Hannover, was appointed as his successor. Co-founders professor Hans Kurt Toenshoff and professor Hans-Peter Wiendahl left the company in 2007 resp. 2008. They were succeeded by two professors of Leibniz University Hannover: Ludger Overmeyer, professor of automation engineering, and Peter Nyhuis, professor of production systems and logistics.

The change of the management board led to a strategic transformation of research topics. In addition to logistics, production automation, and process technology, xxl goods was added to the IPH portfolio as another research topic. The research engineers apply the term xxl goods to products such as planes, ships, wind energy plants but also motor parts of utility vehicles, and jet engines. The company's aim is to promote research dealing with the production of these large scale goods. Currently, IPH is the only research institute exploring this theme from a scientific point of view.

== Organization ==
The company is composed of three departments focusing on logistics, production automation, and process technology. Research dealing with xxl goods is done by all departments.

IPH is run by three managing partners and a managing director. As a non-profit research company, it is funded by public research funding but also by the money earned through industry consulting.

=== Management board ===
- Bernd-Arno Behrens (professor at Leibniz University Hannover)
- Peter Nyhuis (professor at Leibniz University Hannover)
- Ludger Overmeyer (professor at Leibniz University Hannover)
- Georg Ullmann

=== Advisory board ===
- Joerg Seume (professor at Leibniz University Hannover)
- Friedrich-Wilhelm Bach (professor at Leibniz University Hannover)
- Sabine Johannsen (member of the management board of NBank GmbH)
- Volker Bartels (director of Sennheiser electronic GmbH & Co. KG)
- Andreas Jaeger (director of Jaeger Gummi und Kunststoff GmbH)
- Kai Brueggemann (plant and site manager of Airbus Operations GmbH, Bremen)

== Business activities ==
The IPH offers Research and development, consulting, and training in production engineering. Customers range from local small and medium-sized businesses to multinational companies.

Fields of activity include:

- Process technology
- Production automation
- Logistics
- XXL goods

=== Process technology ===
Since 2000 the IPH has been part of the special research field dealing with flashless precision forging (“Sonderforschungsbereich 489”). Funded by the German Research Foundation (Deutsche Forschungsgemeinschaft, DFG), this consortium conducts research on the process chain of high-performance parts forged without flash. According to Doege et al., the term “flashless precision forging” is commonly used in two ways: On the one hand, it describes forging without flash. On the other hand, it is used for forged parts with a tolerance of IT 7 to IT 9. Latest research findings indicate that it is possible to forge complicated parts, such as crankshafts, without flash. In order to forge crankshafts without flash, appropriate preforming processes are necessary. At IPH, the main focus is on multi-directional forging and cross wedge rolling.

IPH engineers also conduct research on cross wedge rolling within the context of process chain design of warm forging. The influence of temperature on both the process and part quality is studied for cross wedge rolling and forge rolling. Also, wearing of forging tools is investigated. A recent approach to reduce wear is the coating of parts with layers of DLC.

Further research efforts include hydro forming (e.g. of titanium). In this context, material and composite material are studied. “Tailored hybrid tubes” is another research area about to be investigated. The term describes material combined of both steel and aluminum.

A new way of forging developed by IPH is hybrid forging. This technique combines both forging and joining of massive parts and sheet metal in one single operation.

Another development fostered by IPH is a module for automatized stud welding with tip ignition that is integrated into sheet metal working tools. This development reduces the process chain significantly. As a result, costs of extra positioning units and time needed for positioning are cut.

In the field of sheet metal forming, efforts are made to increase effectiveness of sheet forming machines. The key performance indicator OEE is used to determine improvements in the elimination of perturbations during the forming process.

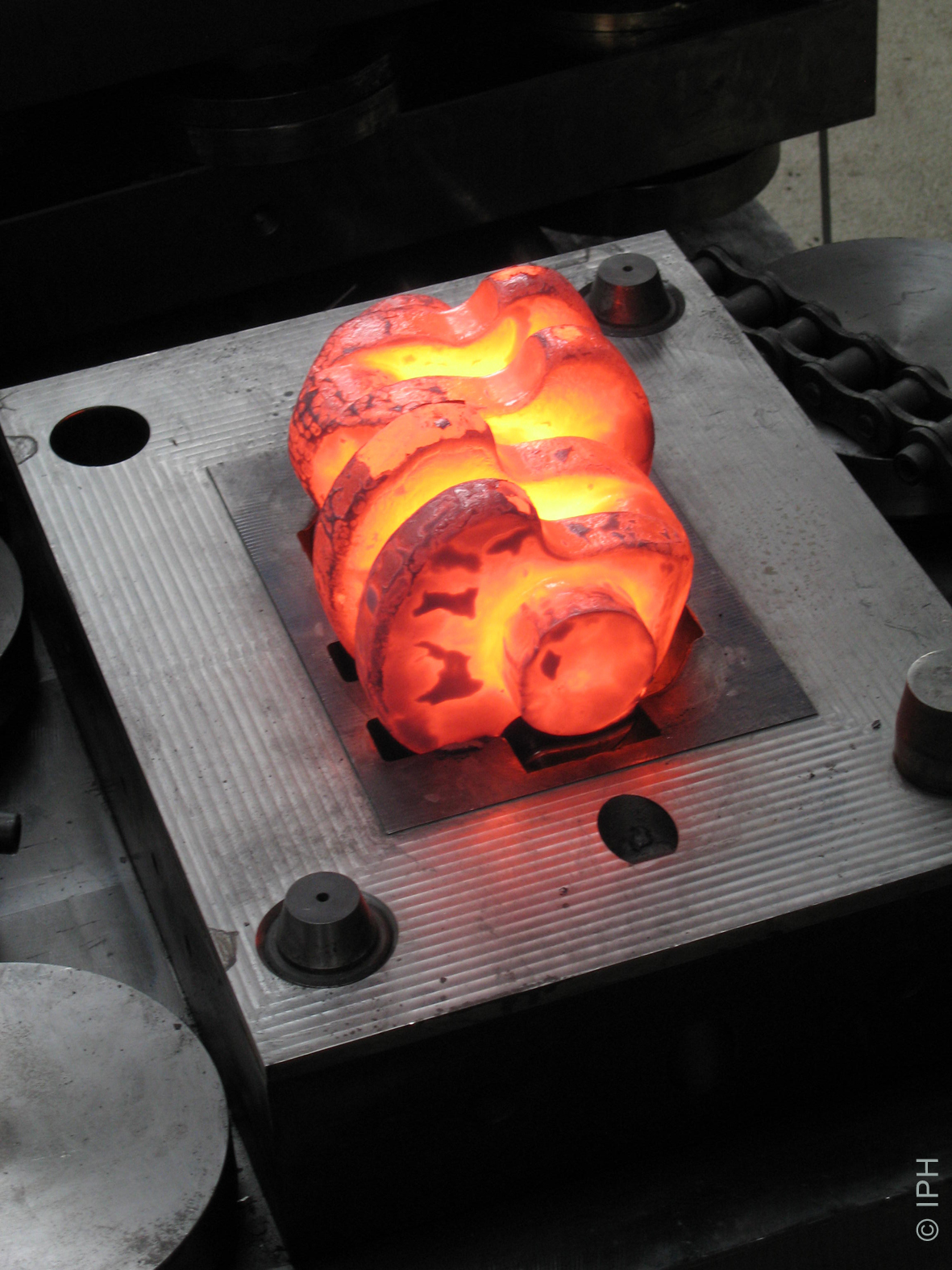
Flashlessly forged two-cylinder crankshaft

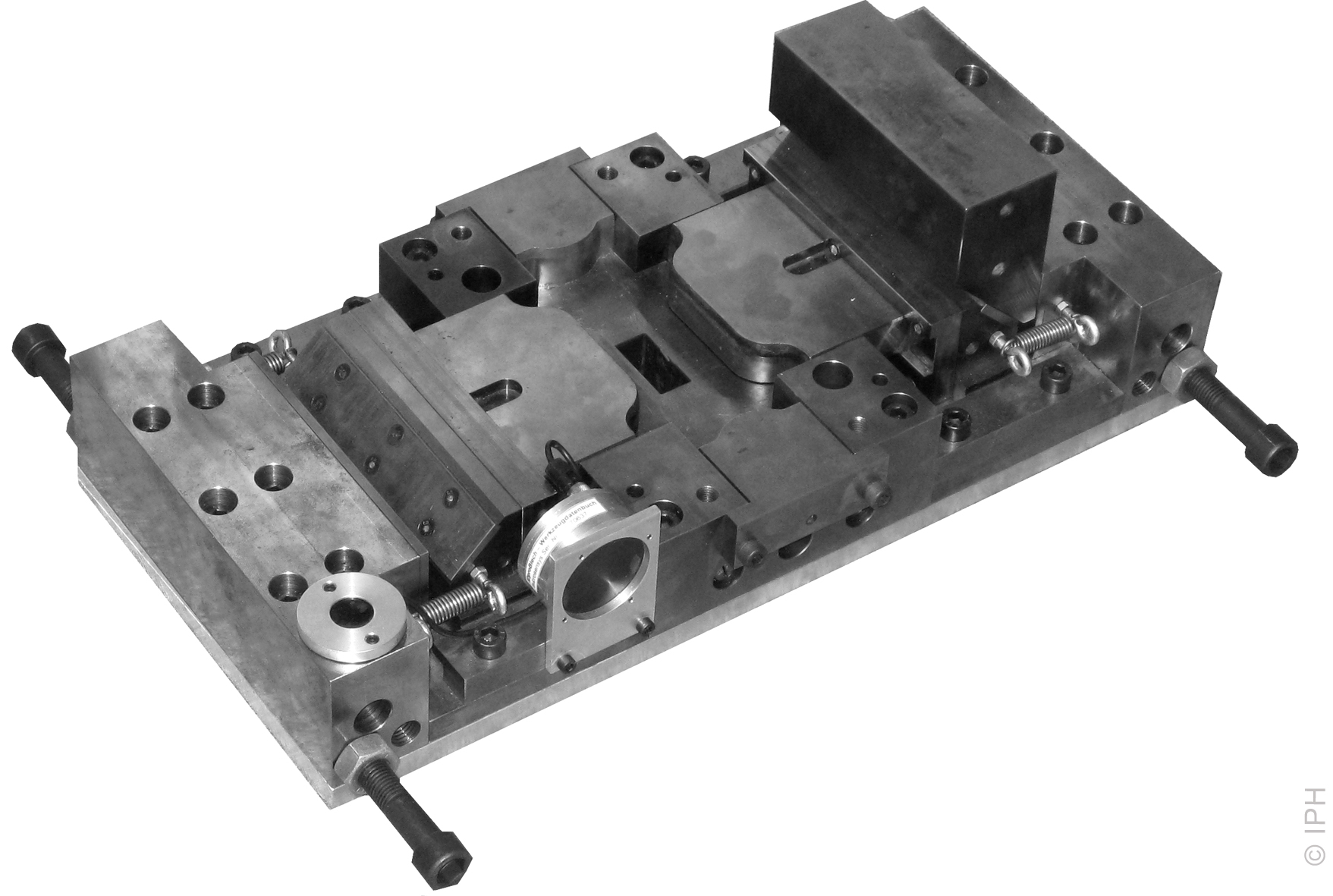
Multi-directional forging tool

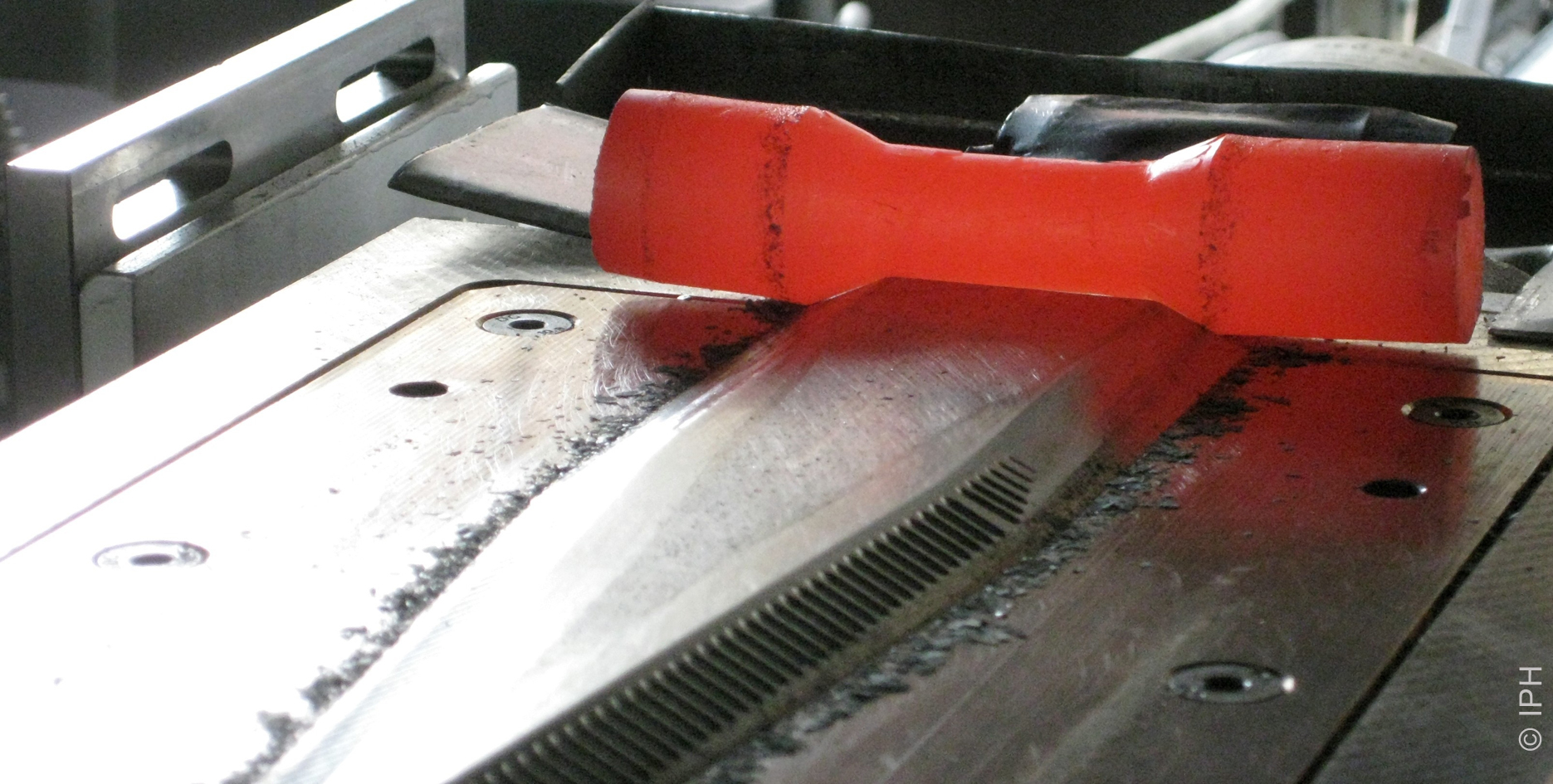
Cross-wedge rolling tool with flat wedges

=== Production automation ===
In the field of production automation, IPH focuses on artificial intelligence, distributed systems, and the use of wireless communication on production sites.

Since the beginning of the new millennium, the IPH has been researching the use of methods of artificial intelligence in industrial engineering. The company's main focus is on the performance-oriented and cost-effective design of interlinked assembly lines through the use of data mining.

Recent research centers on the positioning of cooling channels in injection molding tools, the design of pre-forming geometries for forging processes, and autonomously controlled automated guided vehicles (AGV).

Distributed systems are also subject of research at IPH. As a result of a project funded by the German Federal Ministry of Education and Research (Bundesministerium für Bildung und Forschung, BMBF), an electric tool log was developed. In another research project funded by the German Research Foundation (Deutsche Forschungsgemeinschaft, DFG), intelligent diamond cutting discs were designed. In this particular case, the distributed system consisted of piezoelectric sensors detecting tool vibrations, a measuring system processing and enhancing signals, and a radio module processing signals to a measuring computer.

IPH also concentrates its research efforts on wireless communication and the use of this technology on production sites. To fight the production of counterfeit medications, a new method of integrating RFID tags and antennas into drug packages was developed as part of the EZ pharm project (www.ez-pharm.de). Lately, the Zigbee technology has been applied to an abrasive sheet during a cutoff grinding process.

Recent research in the field of production automation focuses on optical communication. To enable automated guided vehicles to detect their position, a system based on visible light is being designed (www.isi-walk.de). Also, for the use in intralogistics, a new method of identifying goods is being developed.

=== Logistics ===
With regard to logistics, IPH engineers do research on how to design and control production networks efficiently, both ecologically and economically. For example, the project "synchronization of logistic responsiveness in production networks" revealed that structural interactions within networks have a strong influence on dynamic behavior and thus logistic performance.

Furthermore, a scientific method aiming at the economic and organizational planning and assessment of transformability in supply chains is currently being developed as part of the research project “ISI-WALK” (www.isi-walk.de). The method is supposed to help companies to identify e.g. the right point of time to initiate transformation processes.

In various research projects, IPH employees investigate in-plant production logistics. In the special research field dealing with flashless precision forging (“Sonderforschungsbereich 489”), a new batch size calculation method has been developed. It allows for the consideration of bulk forming tool endurance, and thus helps forging companies to avoid additional costs.

An IPH development that has become part of business life is the logistics key performance indicator system developed in a research project called LogiBEST. The KPI system applies to procurement, production, and distribution. Based on this KPI system, the Association of German Engineers (Verein Deutscher Ingenieure, VDI) developed its guideline “VDI-Richtlinie 4400“.
