= Institute of Public Health (Bangladesh) =

Research institute in Bangladesh

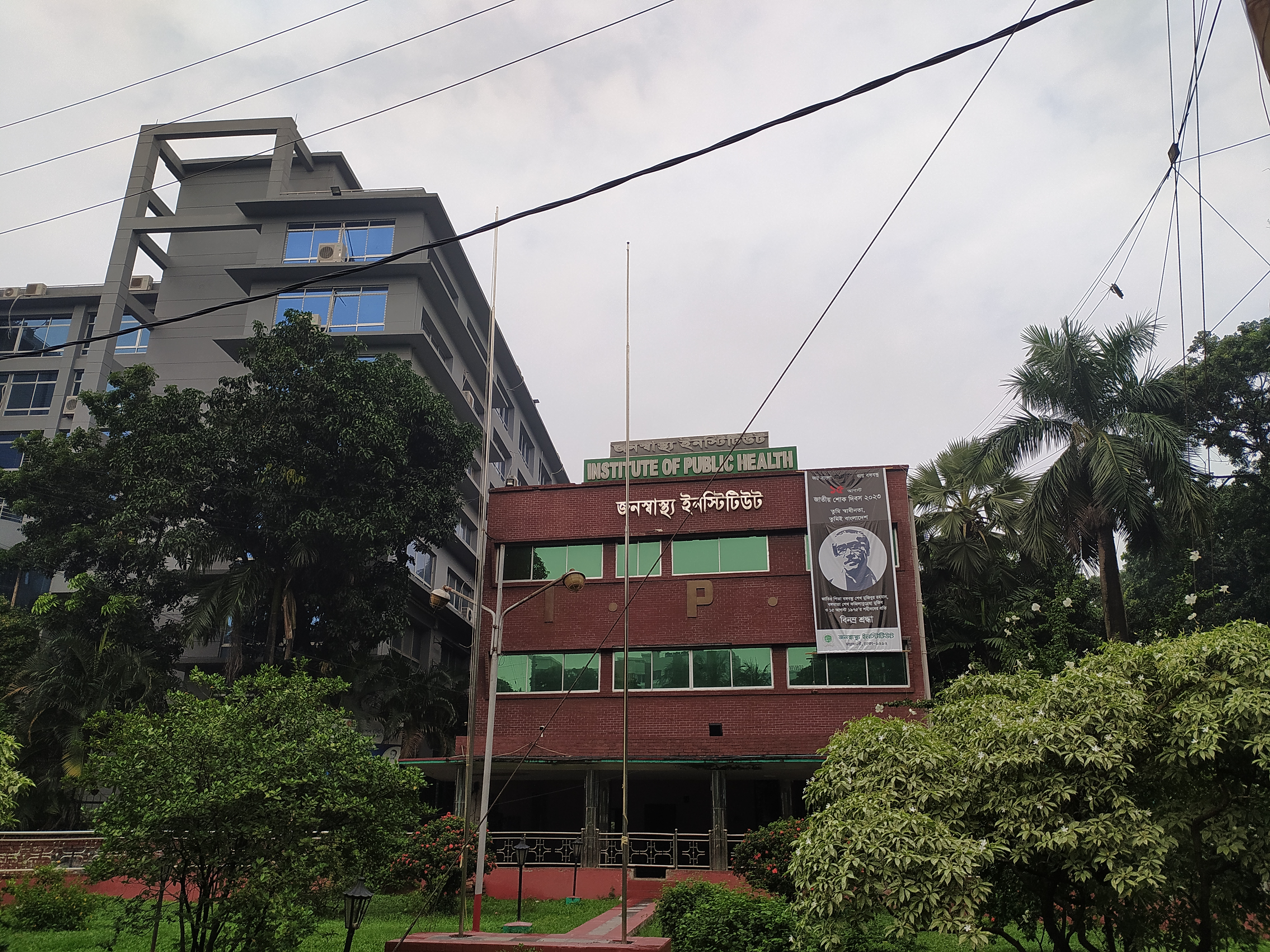
- Formation: 1952
- Headquarters: Dhaka, Bangladesh
- Region served: Bangladesh
- Official language: Bengali
- Website: iph.gov.bd

Institute of Public Health (Bengali: জাতীয় জনস্বাস্থ্য ইনস্টিটিউট) is a Bangladesh government owned and operated public health education and research institute under the Directorate General of Health Services.

== History ==
Institute of Public Health was established in 1952 as the Combined Public Health Laboratories and renamed to Institute of Public Health in 1953.The director of this institute is Dr.Md.Mominur Rahman.The institute has nearly one thousand researchers and academics underneath it. It offers post-graduate degrees and is located on 47.8-acre site in Mohakhali, Dhaka. It has a Virology Unit, Bacteriology Unit, Epidemiology Unit, Laboratory Diagnosis, IntraVenous Fluid Production Unit, Continuous Ambulatory Peritoneal Dialysis (CAPD) Fluid unit, Blood Bag Production Unit, Pasteur Cum Vaccine Institute (PCVI) Unit, Anti Sera Production Unit, Diagnostic Reagent Production Unit, Quality Control Laboratory, Tetanus and Diphtheria Toxoid, and DPT Production Unit, Oral Rehydration (ORS) Salt Production, Food Safety Unit, Public Health Laboratory, National Food Safety Laboratory, and an Academic Wing.

In 2004, the Institute of Public Health found more than 50 percent of the food in Bangladesh was contaminated. In 2014, the institute was facing a large utility bill due to large number of illegal residences built within its premises who were using their electricity illegally.

== Controversy ==
On 29 October 2020, director of the Institute of Public Health, Dr Muhammad Abdur Rahim, issued a circular that mandated Muslim staff dress according to the requirements of the religion including wearing hijab for female employees. Following public outcry he was forced to rescind the order and issue a public apology.
