= U.S.-Mexico Border Infectious Disease Surveillance Project =

The U.S.-Mexico Border Infectious Disease Surveillance Project (BIDS) was a bilateral project undertaken by the Centers for Disease Control and Prevention in cooperation with the Mexican government (specifically the Mexican Secretariat of Health) to promote bi-national border surveillance relating to the spread of harmful diseases between the two nations as well as to establish regional protocol.

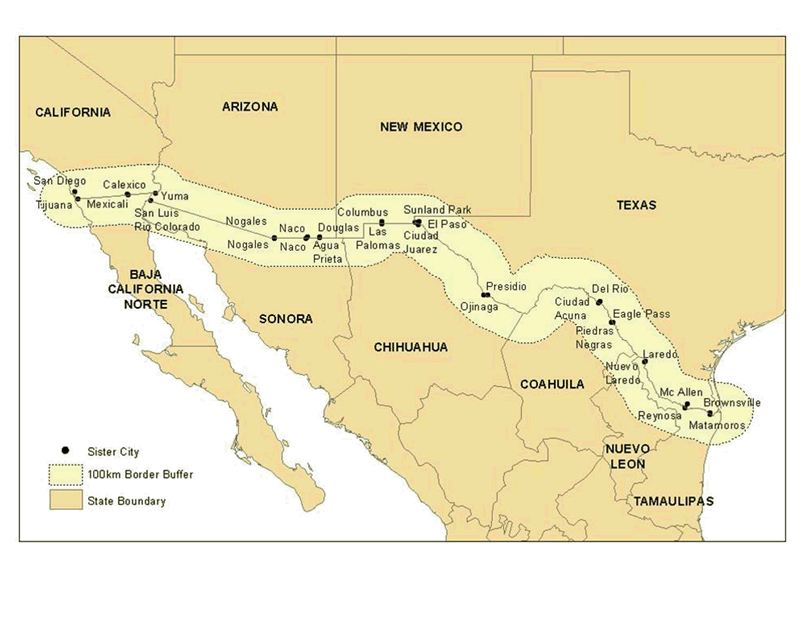
US-Mexico border zone

== Beginnings ==
The development of the project began in 1997. Over a period of three years, a team of officials from both nations constructed an "active, sentinel surveillance system" over a series of 13 clinical sites.

The primary goal of the project was to demonstrate "that a binational effort with local, state, and federal participation can create a regional surveillance system that crosses an international border".

== Investigations ==
The BIDS project conducted investigations of reports concerning an outbreak of dengue fever in Texas and measles in California and Baja California.
