= Chikwe Ihekweazu =

Nigerian epidemiologist

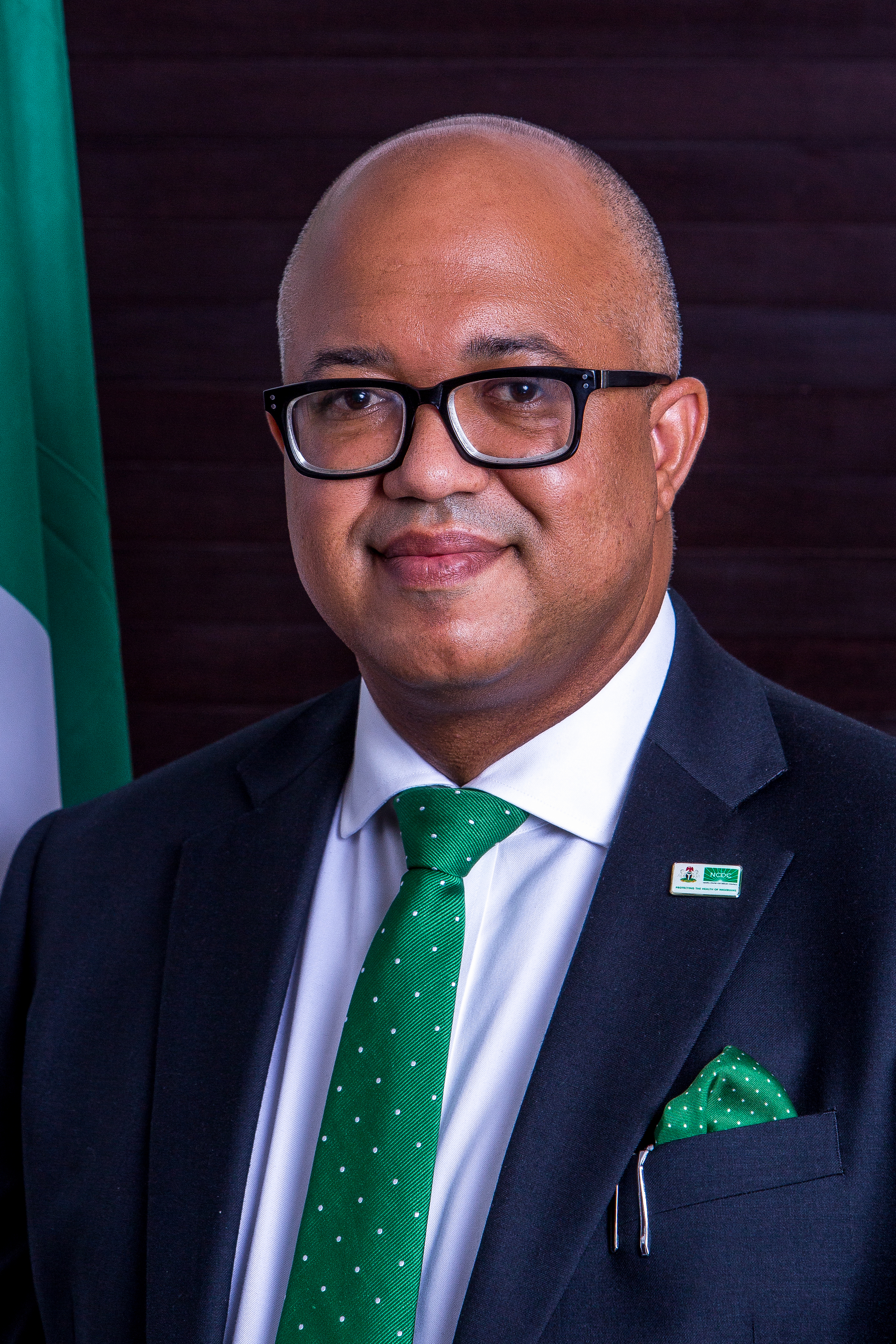
- Chikwe Ihekweazu

Assistant Director General at the World Health Organization
- Incumbent
- Assumed office 1 November 2021

Director General of the Nigeria Centre for Disease Control
- In office 15 August 2016 – 2021

Personal details
- Born: Chikwe Andreas Ihekweazu Germany
- Spouse: Vivianne Ihekweazu
- Education: University of Nigeria; Heinrich Heine University Düsseldorf
- Profession: Epidemiologist; Public health physician Honorary Senior Lecturer

Chikwe Ihekweazu // is a Nigerian epidemiologist, public health physician and the World Health Organization's Assistant Director-General for Health Emergency Intelligence and Surveillance Systems.

Ihekweazu previously served as Director General of Nigeria Centre for Disease Control (NCDC), the agency responsible for protecting public health and safety through the control and prevention of communicable diseases in Nigeria. He was appointed to head the agency in August 2016 by President Muhammadu Buhari.

Ihekweazu trained as an infectious disease epidemiologist and has worked in senior public health and leadership positions in several National Public Health Institutes, including The National Institute for Communicable Diseases South Africa (NICD), the UK's Health Protection Agency, and Germany's Robert Koch Institute (RKI). He has led several short-term engagements for the World Health Organization (WHO), mainly in response to major infectious disease outbreaks around the world. He was part of the WHO-China Joint Mission on Coronavirus disease 2019 (COVID-19).

== Early life and education ==
Ihekweazu was born to Nigerian and German parents. His parents met while they were both studying and beginning their careers in Hamburg, Germany. His father was a Nigerian doctor and the mother, a German professor. They moved back to Nigeria in the early 1979s and his childhood was spent in the small university town of Nsukka where he obtained his foundational education; his secondary school education was obtained at the Federal Government College Enugu (FGCE) from 1983 to 1989.

Ihekweazu holds an MBBS from the University of Nigeria, a Diploma in Tropical Medicine from University of Heidelberg, Germany, a Masters in Public Health from Heinrich Heine University Düsseldorf, Germany, a Fellowship of the European Programme for Intervention Epidemiology Training as well as a Fellowship of the UK's Faculty of Public Health.

== Career ==
From October 1997– January 1999 shortly after his graduation, Ihekweazu completed his Housemanship and served the mandatory one-year Nigerian National Youth Service Corps Scheme. During his service year, he provided direct clinical care and public health functions at the Abia State University Teaching Hospital Aba, Abia State, and Police College, Ikeja Lagos. Nigeria

In October 2001, Ihekweazu worked as a Medical Epidemiologist in the Robert Koch Institute (RKI), Berlin, a German Federal Government Agency and Research Institute responsible for disease control and prevention. During his time at RKI he was responsible for investigating outbreaks involving hospital-associated infections, and the analysis of surveillance data.

In February 2003, Ihekweazu became a Public Health Analyst at Haringey Primary Care trust, National Health Service, England. Chikwe managed routinely collected health intelligence data and the provision of health intelligence and analysis for a period of one year from February 2003 – January 2004. Upon leaving the National Health Service in January 2004, he was competitively selected to join the European Union-funded European Programme for Intervention Epidemiology Training (EPIET) which provided him with service-based specialist training and practical experience in intervention epidemiology. He applied his skills and experience in field epidemiology across a wide range of public health challenges, mostly during outbreaks of infectious diseases.

Following the completion of his fellowship program, Ihekweazu became Specialist Registrar in Public Health Medicine at the Health Protection Agency, England. During his specialist-training programme in Public Health, he led several service-based projects in Public Health organisations in England and gained knowledge and experience in the control of infectious diseases, chemical, radiological and nuclear threats as well as in health project management and leadership.

Afterward, Ihekweazu became a consultant medical epidemiologist at United Kingdom's Health Protection Agency in 2008. The HPA's role was to provide an integrated approach to protecting public health in the UK by providing emergency services, support, and advice to the National Health Service (NHS). During his time there he managed the South East of England's Regional Epidemiology Unit (REU) including a team of 13 Public Health specialists. The REU provided outbreak investigation and management, surveillance, advice, and specialist support for the control of communicable diseases, as well as leading the response to environmental hazards in the South East Region of England, a population of about 10 million people.

In 2011, Ihekweazu moved to Johannesburg, South Africa to become the co-director of the Centre for Tuberculosis at the National Institute for Communicable Diseases with primary responsibility for the epidemiology section. During this period, he also supported NICD to set up the first Provincial Epidemiology Service for the institute. His mandate included designing the service, recruiting the leadership provincial epidemiologists, initiating a supportive relationship in the nine provinces of South Africa, developing epidemiology capacity and surveillance for the institute. He also led the implementation of a nation-wide drug resistance survey for tuberculosis and the implementation of a new integrated surveillance system for tuberculosis in South Africa.

In February 2014, Ihekweazu became a part-time senior adviser at the National Institute for Communicable Diseases (NICD), Johannesburg, South Africa.

=== Nigeria Centre for Disease Control ===
Ihekweazu served as the founding Director General of the Nigeria Centre for Disease Control (NCDC) from 2016 to 2021. During his tenure, he was credited with transforming the NCDC into a world-class institution for disease control in Nigeria and Africa. Following the signing of its Act by President Muhammadu Buhari, Nigeria Centre for Disease Control (NCDC) became an independent agency on 13 November 2018. As Director-General, Ihekweazu led the agency through a period of redevelopment. He led the response to large outbreaks of infectious diseases, as well as a re-emergence of monkeypox and yellow fever in the country. In addition, Ihekweazu oversaw the establishment of the National Reference Laboratory in Abuja, establishment of national and sub-national Public Health Emergency Operations Centres expansion of the agency's field epidemiology training program to build the capacity of public health professionals across the country amongst other achievements.

In recognition of the work done by NCDC under Ihekweazu's leadership, the Director-General of WHO, Tedros Adhanom Ghebreyesus visited the agency in 2018, and former Prime Minister of the UK, Tony Blair visited in 2019. From 2020, Ihekweazu served on the WHO's IHR Emergency Committee for COVID-19, chaired by Didier Houssin. He also led Nigeria's public health response to the pandemic through NCDC. He served as a Member of the Africa Task Force for Coronavirus Steering Committee, where he chaired the Infection Prevention Control Sub-Committee, and was a Member of Nigeria's Presidential Task Force on COVID-19.

=== World Health Organization ===
In November 2021, Ihekweazu was appointed as Assistant Director General for the Division of Health Emergency Intelligence and Surveillance Systems at WHO. He also serves as the head of the WHO Hub for Epidemic and Pandemic Intelligence (office in Berlin, Germany), an initiative established by the WHO and supported by the German government to strengthen pandemic and epidemic intelligence through better data, better analytics, and better decisions.

The WHO Pandemic Hub is responsible for several initiatives to strengthen pandemic and epidemic intelligence including the Epidemic Intelligence from Open Sources Initiative (EIOS), International Pathogen Surveillance Network (IPSN), Open Source Programme Office (OSPO) and several others. The Hub works closely with Member States, WHO Regional and Country Offices, regional and national health agencies, academia, private sector and other non-state actors across geographies and disciplines to collaborate and co-create tools to gather and analyse data to better prepare for, detect and respond to health emergencies. It is built upon the premise that no single discipline or institution will be able to make the world better prepared for the next pandemic. Therefore, the Hub works with experts from various countries and disciplines. He sits on the board of the one of Nigeria's largest NGOs - the Society for Family Health, as well as the Health Advocacy Organisation Nigeria Health Watch.

== Honours and recognitions ==
Ihekweazu is a recipient of the National Productivity Order of Merit and Officer of the Order of the Niger awarded in 2021 and 2022 respectively by the President of the Federal Republic of Nigeria, for his service to Nigeria. He was also awarded an Honorary Doctor of Science by the Liverpool School of Tropical Medicine in January 2022. In 2022, he was awarded the Clara Southmayd Ludlow Medal by the American Society of Tropical Medicine and Health for his work in advancing the field of tropical medicine.

== Health advocacy ==
It was reported by Nature that Ihekweazu criticised Nigeria for being unprepared for epidemics. His critical piece attracted the attention of the former minister of health Babatunde Osotimehin, who suggested a meeting to put his views across to him. In his interview with The Guardian, when asked about fears of an outbreak as deadly as Ebola, plague or any other, he said "Through the recently developed national action plan for health security, we have developed a blueprint across the International Health Regulations work areas to ensure Nigeria is better prepared in the event of a pandemic". Between 2016 and 2018, as CEO of NCDC, Chikwe led several advocacy activities for the passage of the NCDC Bill. Although established in 2011, the NCDC existed without an Act for seven years. The Bill for an Act to establish NCDC was finally passed by the National Assembly and signed into law by President Muhammadu Buhari in November 2018.

== Other activities ==
- Virchow Prize for Global Health, Member of the Council (since 2022)
- Epidemiology and Infection, Member of the Editorial Board
- Journal of Public Health in Africa, Member of the Editorial Board
- One Campaign, Member of the Africa Policy Advisory Board

== Personal life ==
Ihekweazu is married to Vivianne Ihekweazu and they have two children.

== Publications ==
- Elimian, K. O.; Ochu, C. L.; Ilori, E.; Oladejo, J.; Igumbor, E.; Steinhardt, L.; Wagai, J.; Arinze, C.; Ukponu, W.; Obiekea, C.; Aderinola, O.; Crawford, E.; Olayinka, A.; Dan-Nwafor, C.; Okwor, T.; Disu, Y.; Yinka-Ogunleye, A.; Kanu, N. E.; Olawepo, O. A.; Aruna, O.; Michael, C. A.; Dunkwu, L.; Ipadeola, O.; Naidoo, D.; Umeokonkwo, C. D.; Matthias, A.; Okunromade, O.; Badaru, S.; Jinadu, A.; Ogunbode, O.; Egwuenu, A.; Jafiya, A.; Dalhat, M.; Saleh, F.; Ebhodaghe, G. B.; Ahumibe, A.; Yashe, R. U.; Atteh, R.; Nwachukwu, W. E.; Ezeokafor, C.; Olaleye, D.; Habib, Z.; Abdus-Salam, I.; Pembi, E.; John, D.; Okhuarobo, U. J.; Assad, H.; Gandi, Y.; Muhammad, B.; Nwagwogu, C.; Nwadiuto, I.; Sulaiman, K.; Iwuji, I.; Okeji, A.; Thliza, S.; Fagbemi, S.; Usman, R.; Mohammed, A. A.; Adeola-Musa, O.; Ishaka, M.; Aketemo, U.; Kamaldeen, K.; Obagha, C. E.; Akinyode, A. O.; Nguku, P.; Mba, N.; Ihekweazu, C. (11 September 2020). "Descriptive epidemiology of coronavirus disease 2019 in Nigeria, 27 February–6 June 2020". Epidemiology and Infection. 148 e208. doi:10.1017/S095026882000206X. PMC 7506173. PMID 32912370.
- Simpson, Karl; Heymann, David; Brown, Colin S.; Edmunds, W. John; Elsgaard, Jesper; Fine, Paul; Hochrein, Hubertus; Hoff, Nicole A.; Green, Andrew; Ihekweazu, Chikwe; Jones, Terry C.; Lule, Swaib; Maclennan, Jane; McCollum, Andrea; Mühlemann, Barbara; Nightingale, Emily; Ogoina, Dimie; Ogunleye, Adesola; Petersen, Brett; Powell, Jacqueline; Quantick, Ollie; Rimoin, Anne W.; Ulaeato, David; Wapling, Andy (July 2020). "Human monkeypox – After 40 years, an unintended consequence of smallpox eradication". Vaccine. 38 (33): 5077–5081. doi:10.1016/j.vaccine.2020.04.062. PMC 9533855. PMID 32417140.
- Bedford, Juliet; Enria, Delia; Giesecke, Johan; Heymann, David L.; Ihekweazu, Chikwe; Kobinger, Gary; Lane, H. Clifford; Memish, Ziad; Oh, Myoung-don; Sall, Amadou Alpha; Schuchat, Anne; Ungchusak, Kumnuan; Wieler, Lothar H. (28 March 2020). "COVID-19: towards controlling of a pandemic". The Lancet. 395 (10229): 1015–1018. doi:10.1016/S0140-6736(20)30673-5. PMC 7270596. PMID 32197103.
- Ihekweazu, Chikwe; Yinka-Ogunleye, Adesola; Lule, Swaib; Ibrahim, Abubakar (3 May 2020). "Importance of epidemiological research of monkeypox: is incidence increasing?". Expert Review of Anti-infective Therapy. 18 (5): 389–392. doi:10.1080/14787210.2020.1735361. PMC 9491128. PMID 32096659. S2CID 211477598.
- Ismail, Nazir Ahmed; Mvusi, Lindiwe; Nanoo, Ananta; Dreyer, Andries; Omar, Shaheed V.; Babatunde, Sanni; Molebatsi, Thabo; Walt, Martie van der; Adelekan, Adeboye; Deyde, Varough; Ihekweazu, Chikwe; Madhi, Shabir A. (1 July 2018). "Prevalence of drug-resistant tuberculosis and imputed burden in South Africa: a national and sub-national cross-sectional survey". The Lancet Infectious Diseases. 18 (7): 779–787. doi:10.1016/S1473-3099(18)30222-6. PMC 6800151. PMID 29685458.
- Njidda, Ahmad Muhammad; Oyebanji, Oyeronke; Obasanya, Joshua; Ojo, Olubunmi; Adedeji, Adebayo; Mba, Nwando; Oladejo, John; Ihekweazu, Chikwe (1 April 2018). "The Nigeria Centre for Disease Control". BMJ Global Health. 3 (2) e000712. doi:10.1136/bmjgh-2018-000712. PMC 5914765. PMID 29707246. S2CID 13784252.
- Yinka-Ogunleye, Adesola; Aruna, Olusola; Ogoina, Dimie; Aworabhi, Neni; Eteng, Womi; Badaru, Sikiru; Mohammed, Amina; Agenyi, Jeremiah; Etebu, E. N.; Numbere, Tamuno-Wari; Ndoreraho, Adolphe; Nkunzimana, Eduard; Disu, Yahyah; Dalhat, Mahmood; Nguku, Patrick; Mohammed, Abdulaziz; Saleh, Muhammad; McCollum, Andrea M.; Wilkins, Kimberly; Faye, Ousmane; Sall, Amadou; Happi, Christian; Mba, Nwando; Ojo, Olubumi; Ihekweazu, Chikwe (2018). "Reemergence of Human Monkeypox in Nigeria, 2017 - Volume 24, Number 6—June 2018 - Emerging Infectious Diseases journal - CDC". Emerging Infectious Diseases. 24 (6): 1149–1151. doi:10.3201/eid2406.180017. PMC 6004876. PMID 29619921.
- Dan-Nwafor, Chioma C.; Furuse, Yuki; Ilori, Elsie A; Ipadeola, Oladipupo; Akabike, Kachikwulu O; Ahumibe, Anthony; Ukponu, Winifred; Bakare, Lawal; Okwor, Tochi J; Joseph, Gbenga; Mba, Nwando G; Akano, Adejoke; Olayinka, Adebola T; Okoli, Ihekerenma; Okea, Rita A; Makava, Favour; Ugbogulu, Nkem; Oladele, Saliu; Namara, Geoffrey; Muwanguzi, Esther N; Naidoo, Dhamari; Mutbam, Samuel K; Okudo, Ifeanyi; Woldetsadik, Solomon F; Lasuba, Clement LP; Ihekweazu, Chikwe (16 May 2019). "Measures to control protracted large Lassa fever outbreak in Nigeria, 1 January to 28 April 2019". Eurosurveillance. 24 (20). doi:10.2807/1560-7917.ES.2019.24.20.1900272. PMC 6530254. PMID 31115314.
