= National Public Health Organization (Greece) =

Greek health agency

- Εθνικός Οργανισμός Δημόσιας Υγείας
- Predecessor: Center for Diseases Control and Prevention
- Formation: March 9, 2019; 7 years ago
- Legal status: private legal entity
- Headquarters: Marousi, Attica, Greece
- President: Christos Chatzichristodoulou
- Vice President in charge of infectious diseases: Georgios Panagiotakopoulos
- Board of directors: Maria Piagkou, Georgios Sourvinos, Aggeliki Dreliozi, Efthimios Anagnostopoulos, Aristea Diamantopoulou, Aggelos Papanikolaou, Aikaterini Tsatsaragkou
- Website: eody.gov.gr

The National Public Health Organization (NPHO) (Greek: Εθνικός Οργανισμός Δημόσιας Υγείας, ΕΟΔΥ) in Greece, former Center for Diseases Control and Prevention (Greek: Κέντρο Ελέγχου και Πρόληψης Νοσημάτων, ΚΕΕΛΠΝΟ) constitutes the operational center for the planning and implementation of public health protection actions in the country and is responsible for the surveillance and control of diseases in Greece. It is supervised by the Greek Ministry of Health and its headquarters is located in Marousi, Attica. The current president of the organization is Christos Chatzichristodoulou.

The Greek NPHO is a private legal entity that was originally established by Law 4600 in March 2019 (as a legal entity of public law) and took its current form by Law 4633 in October 2019. It is the full successor of the former Center for Diseases Control and Prevention, which was replaced by Law 4600/2019. EODY has been in a central position, for example, in maintaining the situational picture of Greece during the Covid-19 pandemic that started in 2020 (see: coronavirus pandemic in Greece).

== Purpose ==
The purpose of the National Public Health Organization is to protect and improve the health and increase the life expectancy of the population. For this reason, NPHO assists other public health services to protect the population and counter any threats to human health arising from infectious diseases through early detection, monitoring and evaluation of risks and through the submission of proposals and intervention measures. The NPHO also develops and promotes actions aimed at promoting health, and its main functions include epidemiological surveillance, risk assessment, scientific advice, as well as the provision of epidemiological and statistical data to national, European and international authorities, among others.

== Administration ==
According to the latest legislation, NPHO is managed by the seven-member Board of Directors (BoD), the President and the two Vice-Presidents, one of which is in charge of infectious diseases and the other of non-communicable diseases. The seven members of the BoD, the President and the Vice-Presidents of NPHO are appointed by decision of the Minister of Health and their tenure of office is three years with the possibility of renewal for one more term.
