= 2009 swine flu pandemic timeline =

Community outbreaks, June 2009

Confirmed cases by U.S. state, June 3, 2009

This article covers the chronology of the 2009 novel influenza A (H1N1) pandemic. Flag icons denote the first announcements of confirmed cases by the respective nation-states, their first deaths (and other major events such as their first intergenerational cases, cases of zoonosis, and the start of national vaccination campaigns), and relevant sessions and announcements of the World Health Organization (WHO), the European Union (and its agency the European Centre for Disease Prevention and Control), and the U.S. Centers for Disease Control (CDC).

Unless otherwise noted, references to terms like S-OIV, H1N1 and such, all refer to this new A(H1N1) strain and not to sundry other strains of H1N1 which are endemic in humans, birds and pigs.

== Timeline ==
Take note that the date of the first confirmations of the disease or any event in a country may be before or after the date of the events in local time because of the International Dateline.

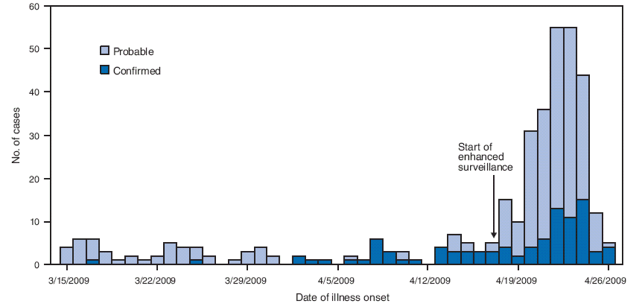
Probable and confirmed Mexican cases by date of illness onset, March 15 – April 26. —CDC

=== March 2009 ===
Mexico In La Gloria, Veracruz 60% of the town's population is sickened by a respiratory illness of unknown provenance. The government of Mexico believes it to be caused by H3N2 influenza, though at least one patient in La Gloria tested positive for A/H1N1. Two babies died in the outbreak but both were buried without testing.

==== March 7 ====
United States In the ninth week of its routine influenza surveillance, the CDC reports on FluView that thirty-five states have reported widespread influenza activity, and 14 states have reported regional activity, but that although the rate of activity was high, that the proportion of deaths attributed to pneumonia and influenza (P&I) was below the epidemic threshold.

==== March 14 ====
United States The CDC reports on the 10th week of FluView that thirty states reported widespread influenza activity and 18 states reported regional activity.

==== March 17 ====
Mexico Earliest known onset of a case that is later to be confirmed as Swine-Origin Influenza A (H1N1) Virus Infection.

==== March 21 ====
United States CDC FluView, Week 11: Widespread influenza activity in twenty-four states; regional activity in 19. Influenza activity continues to decrease.

==== March 28 ====
Confirmed USA cases with known dates of illness onset (April 27, 2009). —CDC

United States Earliest known onset of a USA case later confirmed as swine flu, that of a nine-year-old girl residing in Imperial County, California. Thirteen states reported widespread influenza activity and 19 reported regional activity on the CDC's FluView, Week 12.

==== March 30 ====
United States A sample is collected from a nine-year-old female patient which is later confirmed to contain the novel virus strain (genetically sequenced as A/California/05/2009(H1N1)).

United States Onset of illness for a ten-year-old boy residing in San Diego County, California; his case is eventually the first to be confirmed as swine flu in the US.

=== April 2009 ===
==== April 1 ====
United States A nasopharyngeal swab is collected from a ten-year-old male patient in San Diego County, later confirmed as containing the novel virus and the first organism of that strain to be completely sequenced (A/California/04/2009(H1N1)).

==== April 2 ====
Mexico In La Gloria, Veracruz, a four-year-old boy falls ill at the end of the outbreak. Only his sample, which was eventually sent abroad, tested positive for A(H1N1). Veracruz officials state that there were no plans to exhume the bodies of two infants who died in the outbreak.

==== April 4 ====
United States CDC FluView, Week 13: Widespread influenza activity in four states, regional activity in 18.

==== April 5 ====
European Union The media monitoring website MedISys reports on a Mexican article about the epidemiological alert.

==== April 6 ====
Mexico Public health authorities begin investigating unusual cases of pneumonia. 400 people had reportedly sought treatment for pneumonia/influenza-like illness (ILI) in La Gloria the preceding week.

United States Biosurveillance firm Veratect reports the unusual respiratory illness in Mexico. Veratect publishes the alert "La Gloria: 'Strange' Respiratory Affects 60% of Local Population; Three Pediatric Deaths May be Associated with the Outbreak."

==== April 11 ====
United States CDC FluView, Week 14: Widespread influenza activity in one state; regional activity in 14.

==== April 12 ====
Mexico The General Directorate of Epidemiology (DGE) reports the outbreak of an ILI in a small community in Veracruz to the Pan American Health Organization (PAHO), which is the Regional Office of the World Health Organization (WHO). Furthermore, a 39-year-old woman dies of severe viral pneumonia in the city of San Luis Potosí; this is later believed to be the earliest known fatality related to the outbreak.

==== April 13 ====
Mexico First death in Oaxaca due to what would later be identified as swine flu.

United States The U.S. Centers for Disease Control (CDC) is advised of a ten-year-old boy with a respiratory illness in San Diego County, California. Test results revealed an Influenza A virus but were negative for standard human strains. The San Diego County Health Department is notified.

==== April 14 ====
United States The CDC receives its first sample from California (from the ten-year-old boy in San Diego County), and identifies the virus as a strain of swine influenza A(H1N1).

==== April 16 ====
Mexico Authorities notify the PAHO of the atypical pneumonia.

United States Veratect publishes the alert "Atypical Pneumonia Cases Reported at Hospital" regarding the Oaxaca cases.

==== April 17 ====
Mexico A case of atypical pneumonia in Oaxaca prompts enhanced national surveillance. A field investigation is started. Mexico contacts Canada to request more specialized testing.

United States The CDC receives a second sample from Southern California (taken from the nine-year-old girl in Imperial County), and again identifies the virus as a strain of swine influenza A(H1N1). The California Department of Public Health is notified.

==== April 18 ====
Mexico Mexico sends 14 mucus samples to the CDC and dispatches health teams hospitals to look for patients showing severe influenza- or pneumonia-like symptoms.

United States CDC FluView, Week 15: "Nine states reported regional activity; 17 states reported local influenza activity; the District of Columbia and 22 states reported sporadic influenza activity; and two states reported no influenza activity. Seven human infections with swine influenza A (H1N1) virus have been confirmed." This is the first mention of A(H1N1) in FluView.

==== April 20 ====
United States Veratect advises the CDC of the Mexican events. The CDC is already investigating the California and Texas cases.

==== April 21 ====
United States The CDC alerts physicians to a similar novel strain of swine influenza A(H1N1) in two cases from Southern California in a Morbidity and Mortality Weekly Report Early Release on its website. Local investigations, including investigations in Texas, are already underway, and overall surveillance is enhanced. The Associated Press covers the alert, the first mention of the A(H1N1) outbreak in English-language news media.

==== April 22 ====
Canada Canada receives the samples from Mexico for testing.

==== April 23 ====
Mexico The Public Health Agency of Canada confirms Mexico cases of swine-origin influenza A (H1N1) virus (S-OIV) infection. Genetic sequence analysis reveals that the Mexican patients were infected with the same S-OIV strain detected in two California children. The PAHO is informed that a cluster in Mexico of severe respiratory illnesses has been laboratory-confirmed as S-OIV infection.

==== April 24 ====
(World Health Organization) The WHO issues its first Disease Outbreak Notice on the matter, confirming the infection of a number of people in Mexico and the United States by "Swine Influenza A/H1N1 viruses... not... previously detected in pigs or humans".

Mexico The Minister of Health confirms the Mexican cases of human infection by swine influenza and states that it believes that some of these cases had resulted in death. Health authorities implement public health measures for all airport passengers and the vaccination of health care workers with seasonal influenza vaccine.

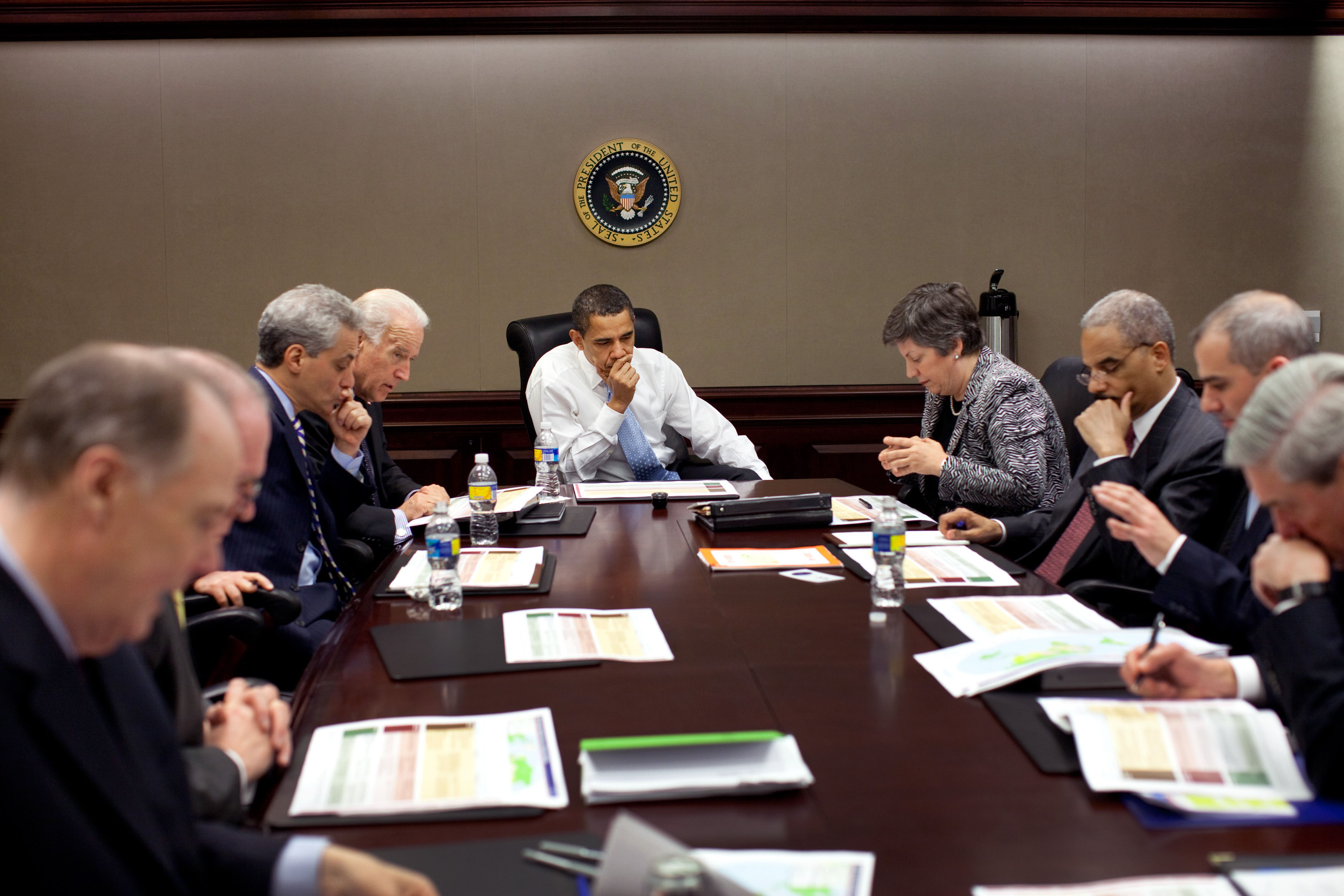
President Obama is briefed in the Situation Room about the H1N1 outbreak.

United States The CDC tells a press conference that seven of the 14 Mexican samples contained the same virus strain as the known in California and Texas, and that indications suggested that containment in the USA was "not very likely". The novel strain had already been reported on the CDC's Morbidity and Mortality Weekly Report website.

==== April 25 ====
(World Health Organization) WHO Under the International Health Regulations (IHR), the Emergency Committee convenes for the first time since its establishment in 2007, resulting in the WHO Director-General declaring a formal "public health emergency of international concern," (PHEIC), the first ever.

(World Health Organization) The PAHO Vaccination Week In The Americas starts. The 2009 Week was planned to emphasize the vaccination of entire families, and health worker immunization.

United States First closure of an entire school district, the Schertz-Cibolo-Universal City Independent School District outside San Antonio, Texas.

==== April 26 ====
United States United States declares a Public Health Emergency.

==== April 27 ====
World Health Organization Regions Africa; HQ: Brazzaville, Congo Americas; HQ: Washington, DC, USA Europe; HQ: Copenhagen, Denmark Eastern Med.; HQ: Cairo, Egypt South East Asia; HQ: New Delhi, India Western Pacific; HQ: Manila, Philippines

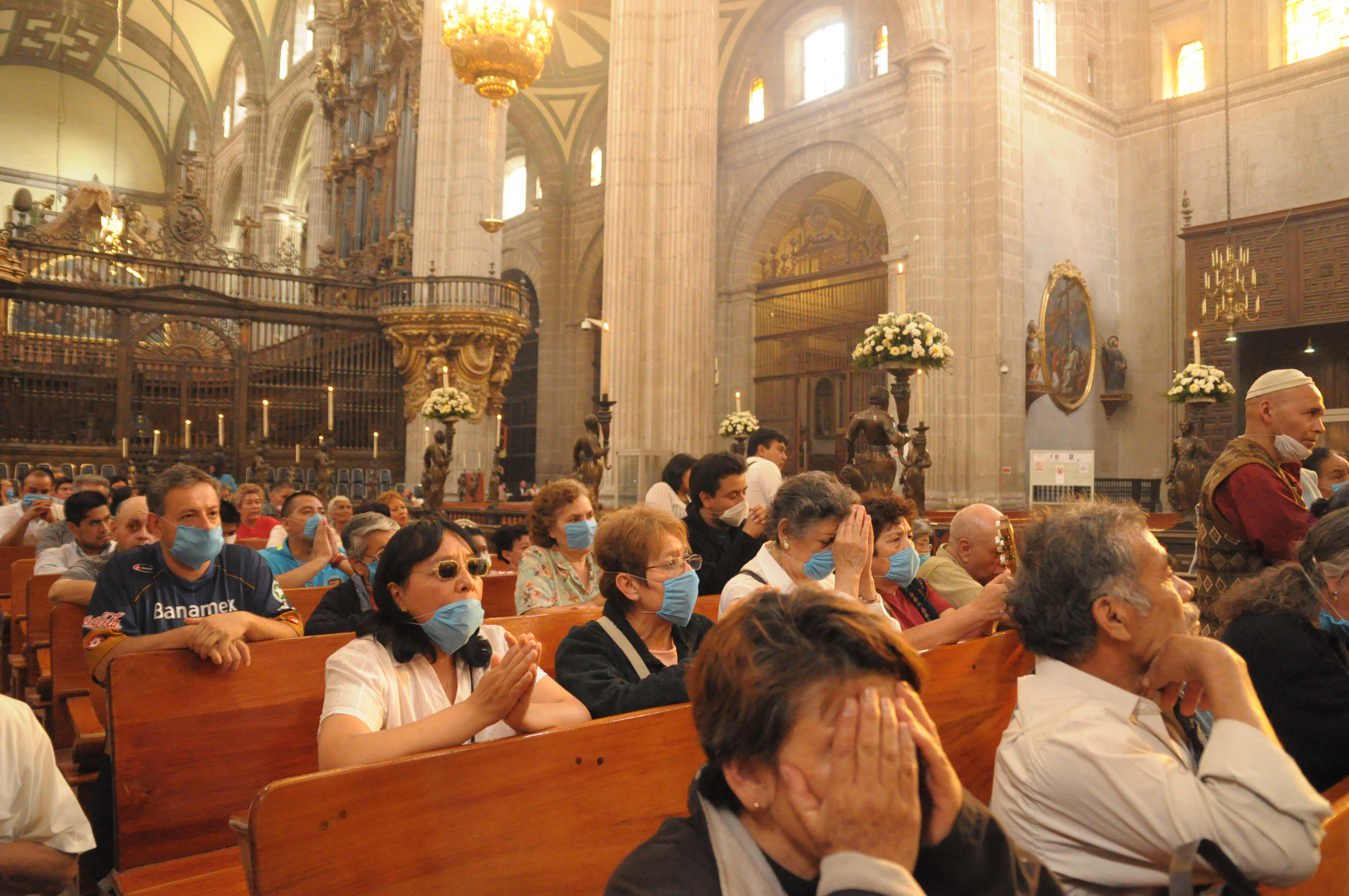
Mexico City Metropolitan Cathedral

(World Health Organization) WHO The Emergency Committee meets for the second time. The WHO Director-General issues a statement that containment of the outbreak is not feasible, and elevates the pandemic alert from Phase 3 to Phase 4.

European Union (EU) Health Commissioner advises Europeans not to travel to the United States or Mexico unless the need is urgent. This follows the first confirmed case in Spain.

Canada First six cases confirmed, four in Nova Scotia and two in British Columbia.

Mexico First seven confirmed deaths

Spain First confirmed case of swine flu, in Almansa, and thus the first case in Europe; A(H1N1) has spread from the WHO Region of the Americas to the WHO European Region.

( ) United Kingdom First two confirmed cases, in Scotland.

==== April 28 ====
(World Health Organization) WHO Confirmed cases are now extant in four of six WHO regions (see map). As of 19:15 GMT seven countries have officially reported cases of swine influenza A(H1N1) infection.

Canada Confirmed: two cases and another four in Alberta and Ontario, respectively.

Israel First confirmed case in Israel and thus the WHO Eastern Mediterranean Region (color-coded yellow), the third region to be affected.

New Zealand First three confirmed cases in New Zealand and thus the WHO Western Pacific Region (color-coded red), the fourth region to be affected.

Spain The second confirmed case in Spain, in Valencia.

==== April 29 ====
(World Health Organization) WHO The Emergency Committee meets for the third time, and the WHO raises its pandemic alert level from Phase 4 to Phase 5, its second highest. As of 1800 GMT, nine countries have officially reported 148 cases of swine influenza A(H1N1) infection.

ASEAN ASEAN officials are looking at coordinating measures to address the potential pandemic.

(European Union) EU Foreign Relations Commissioner Benita Ferrero-Waldner announces that the halt of all travel to Mexico and disinfecting all airports due to the global flu outbreak is being considered.

Austria First confirmed case.

Germany First three confirmed cases, two in Bavaria and one in Hamburg.

Spain Eight more cases raises the total in Spain to 10, including the first human-to-human intergenerational transmission (in which the patient had not recently been to Mexico but was infected by another patient who had just visited Mexico, namely his girlfriend). This is the first intergenerational transmission to be documented in Europe.

United States First death outside Mexico, a 23-month-old Mexican child hospitalized in Texas. Ninety-one confirmed cases in the US to date.

South Africa First two cases reported within South Africa, by two women that travelled in Mexico weeks earlier. The cases were confirmed on 18 June 2009.

==== April 30 ====
Canada Confirmed: One more case in Toronto, and eight more cases in Nova Scotia, and Alberta bringing total to 28.

(Republic of Ireland) Ireland First confirmed case.

Netherlands First confirmed case, a three-year-old child. The child returned from Mexico to the Netherlands on April 27, 2009. The parents test negative for A(H1N1).

Switzerland First confirmed case.

United States Four cases are confirmed in an outbreak at the University of Delaware; another 12 cases are deemed "probable". One of the confirmed cases is a baseball player, which results in the university cancelling sporting events, a concert by rapper Young Jeezy, and other school activities.

United Kingdom Three further confirmed cases of swine flu, giving a total of eight confirmed cases.

=== May 2009 ===
==== May 1 ====
(World Health Organization) WHO As of 0600 GMT, 11 countries have officially reported 331 cases of influenza A(H1N1) infection.

Canada 51 confirmed cases.

Hong Kong

- 300 people are placed under quarantine at a hotel for seven days due to Hong Kong's first confirmed case there.
- Chief Executive Donald Tsang raises Hong Kong's response level from "serious" to "emergency".
- The Director of Health, Dr. PY Lam, orders Metropark Hotel in Wan Chai to be isolated for seven days.

Denmark First confirmed case (in Hvidovre).

France First two confirmed cases.

Mexico begins an unprecedented five-day shutdown to fight the spread of the flu.

United Kingdom First and second case of human to human (or intergenerational) transmission within the UK confirmed.

United States 155 confirmed cases, including two at George Washington University's Thurston Hall.

==== May 2 ====
(World Health Organization) WHO As of 0600 GMT 15 countries have officially reported 615 cases of influenza A(H1N1) infection.

Canada The Canadian Food Inspection Agency confirms the first human-to-animal transmission of the virus after an Albertan returns from Mexico and infects a pig farm, the first known case of (reverse) zoonosis.

China suspends flights from Mexico.

South Korea First confirmed case.

United States There are more than 430 school closures in 18 states. CDC FluView Week 17: Widespread activity in seven states, regional activity in 12.

==== May 3 ====
(World Health Organization) WHO As of 0600 GMT, 17 countries have officially reported 787 cases of (A)H1N1.

Arab League Health Ministers meet in Riyadh, to discuss human and technical support to be deployed in any Arab affected place.

Canada 101 confirmed cases after seven cases in British Columbia, three in Alberta, two in Nova Scotia and Ontario, and one in Quebec were confirmed.

Colombia First confirmed case in South America.

==== May 4 ====
(World Health Organization) WHO As of 06:00 GMT, 20 countries have officially reported 985 cases of influenza A (H1N1) infection.

Canada A girl from Edmonton, Alberta was diagnosed with a severe case of the H1N1 virus.

==== May 5 ====
(World Health Organization) WHO As of 06:00 GMT, 21 countries have officially reported 1,124 cases of influenza A (H1N1) infection.

United States

- Second confirmed death, the first of a U.S. resident, a pregnant special education teacher in Texas: Judy Trunnell. The 33-year-old gives birth to her second child via Caesarian section during her eighth month of pregnancy, in a coma whilst on life support. Judy Trunnell had several underlying medical conditions, most notably asthma.
- Several sailors in San Diego, California fall ill (including a sailor on the USS Dubuque, which results in the cancellation of its deployment). These are the first cases in the U.S. Navy.
- As the low level of virulence of novel A(H1N1) in the U.S. becomes established, the CDC issues revised criteria for school closures, effectively ending widespread shutdowns.

==== May 6 ====
(World Health Organization) WHO As of 06:00 GMT, 22 countries have officially reported 1,516 cases of influenza A (H1N1) infection.

ASEAN A special regional summit to fight possible swine flu pandemic was held in Bangkok and was attended by senior ASEAN health officials along with those from China, Japan and South Korea.

Guatemala First confirmed case, and the first in Central America.

Poland First confirmed case.

Sweden First confirmed case.

==== May 7 ====
(World Health Organization) WHO As of 18:00 GMT, 24 countries have officially reported 2,371 cases of influenza A (H1N1) infection.

Argentina First confirmed case.

Brazil First four confirmed cases.

Canada Reports suggest that an elderly woman who had swine flu has died in northern Alberta, marking the first death in Canada related to swine flu. Furthermore, an unusual case of zoonosis occurred when a swine flu inspector in improper gear caught the virus from an infected pig.

Netherlands Second case confirmed, a 53-year-old woman who had recently travelled to Mexico.

(United States) USA The New England Journal of Medicine establishes its H1N1 Influenza Center on its website.

==== May 8 ====
(World Health Organization) WHO As of 16:00 GMT, 25 countries have officially reported 2,500 cases of influenza A (H1N1) infection.

Japan First three confirmed cases.

Panama First confirmed case.

==== May 9 ====
(World Health Organization) WHO As of 06:00 GMT, 29 countries have officially reported 3,440 cases of influenza A(H1N1) infection.

Australia First confirmed case.

Brazil Two cases confirmed, one of which is thought to be the first case of human-to-human infection in Brazil.

Costa Rica First confirmed death, and also the first death outside of North America. Three other confirmed cases, all children, were contaminated by the patient who died.

Japan 4th confirmed case, a schoolmate of the first three cases.

Norway First two confirmed cases.

United States Third confirmed death, a Washington man with underlying heart disease. Also, the USA passes Mexico in the number of confirmed cases of infection, 1693 to 1364, thus becoming the nation-state with the most laboratory-confirmed cases of infection; Canada is third with 242 cases. CDC FluView Week 18: Widespread influenza activity in eight states, regional activity in 14.

==== May 10 ====
(World Health Organization) WHO As of 07:30 GMT, 29 countries have officially reported 4,379 cases of influenza A(H1N1) infection.

China First confirmed case.

==== May 11 ====
(World Health Organization) WHO As of 06:00 GMT, 30 countries have officially reported 4,694 cases of influenza A(H1N1) infection.

==== May 12 ====
(World Health Organization) WHO As of 06:00 GMT, 30 countries have officially reported 5,251 cases of influenza A(H1N1) infection.

Canada The first case in Yukon Territory is confirmed.

Spain 100 cases confirmed.

==== May 13 ====
(World Health Organization) WHO As of 06:00 GMT, 13 May 2009, 33 countries have officially reported 5,728 cases of influenza A(H1N1) infection.

Belgium First confirmed case.

Panama 10 more cases confirmed today. Total: 39.

==== May 14 ====
(World Health Organization) WHO As of 06:00 GMT, 33 countries have officially reported 6,497 cases of influenza A(H1N1) infection.

Belgium Second confirmed case.

Colombia First domestic infections with three cases confirmed. Total: 10.

==== May 15 ====
(World Health Organization) WHO As of 06:00 GMT, 34 countries have officially reported 7,520 cases of influenza A(H1N1) infection.

(United States) USA Fourth and fifth deaths confirmed, that of an Arizona woman suffering from a lung condition and a Texas man in Corpus Christi, respectively.

Malaysia First confirmed case. Malaysia is the 37th country to be affected by the virus.

Panama Four new cases confirmed today. Total: 43, 23 of whom are male and 20 of whom are female. 20 of the cases are under 15 years old.

==== May 16 ====
(World Health Organization) WHO As of 06:00 GMT 36 countries have officially reported 8,451 cases of influenza A(H1N1) infection.

India First case confirmed, in Hyderabad. This marks the arrival of A(H1N1) in the fifth of the WHO's six regions, the South-East Asia Region.

Japan First domestic infection confirmed, in Kobe, a male high school student with no history of travel abroad. The Kobe Festival, planned for May 16 and 17, is cancelled.

Malaysia Second confirmed case. The first patient is now showing significant improvement from the treatment.

Panama 11 new confirmed cases. 54 total.

Turkey First confirmed case, that of an American tourist flying from the United States via Amsterdam, discovered at Istanbul's Atatürk International Airport.

United States CDC FluView Week 19: Widespread influenza activity in five states, regional activity in 13.

==== May 17 ====
(World Health Organization) WHO As of 06:00 GMT 37 countries have officially reported 8,480 cases of influenza A(H1N1) infection.

Panama With 54 confirmed cases, Panama occupies second place, along with Canada, for the number of cases per country.

==== May 18 ====
(World Health Organization) WHO As of 06:00 GMT, 40 countries have officially reported 8,829 cases of influenza A(H1N1) infection, including 74 deaths.

(European Union) ECDC The European Centre for Disease Control releases its early findings on H1N1's pandemic potential.

Japan reports 96 confirmed cases; it now ranks fourth in the world in the number of infections. Thousands of schools in 21 cities in the Hyogo and Osaka prefectures are temporarily closed.

(United States) USA The sixth death in the US, and the first in New York—that of an assistant principal.

==== May 19 ====
(World Health Organization) WHO As of 06:00 GMT, 40 countries have officially reported 9,830 cases of influenza A(H1N1) infection, including 79 deaths.

United States Seventh confirmed death, that of a 44-year-old Missouri man.

Japan 191 confirmed cases; Hyogo Prefecture has the most at 111.

Norway One more case confirmed today. Total: three.

Paraguay confirmed its first case and became the 43rd affected country.

Taiwan confirmed its first case and becomes the 44th affected country.

==== May 20 ====
(World Health Organization) WHO As of 06:00 GMT, 40 countries have officially reported 10,243 cases of influenza A(H1N1) infection, including 80 deaths.

United States A patient dies in Arizona, and a 22-year-old man dies in Utah, the nation's eighth and ninth H1N1 fatalities. Roughly half of the influenza viruses detected by the CDC's routine influenza surveillance systems are now that of novel A(H1N1). An unusual number of outbreaks in schools is reported.

Japan 236 confirmed cases, including the first case in Shiga Prefecture, and the cities of Hachiōji and Kawasaki in the Greater Tokyo Area. Two female high school students from Tokyo who had recently attended a Model United Nations conference in New York are presumed to have become infected abroad.

Norway 1 more case confirmed today. Total: 4.

==== May 21 ====
(World Health Organization) WHO As of 06:00 GMT, 41 countries have officially reported 11,034 cases of influenza A(H1N1) infection, including 85 deaths.

Japan 279 confirmed cases; more than 4,800 schools are closed in the Kobe region.

==== May 22 ====
(World Health Organization) WHO As of 06:00 GMT, 42 countries have officially reported 11,168 cases of influenza A(H1N1) infection, including 86 deaths.

Japan 317 confirmed, including first confirmed in Saitama Prefecture. Third confirmed in Tokyo, a 25-year-old man who visited Osaka from May 14-20th.

Philippines First case confirmed.

==== May 23 ====
(World Health Organization) WHO As of 06:00 GMT, 43 countries have officially reported 12,022 cases of influenza A(H1N1) infection, including 86 deaths.

Iceland First confirmed case. 4 more cases suspected. United States CDC FluView Week 20: Widespread influenza activity in four states; regional activity in 11.

==== May 24 ====
Australia Two more confirmed cases, which now brings the national toll to 16.

Kuwait First confirmed cases, that of 18 U.S. soldiers.

==== May 25 ====
(World Health Organization) WHO As of 06:00 GMT, 46 countries have officially reported 12,515 cases of influenza A(H1N1) infection, including 91 deaths.

Australia 22 Confirmed Cases.

(Republic of Ireland) Ireland Second confirmed case.

==== May 26 ====
(World Health Organization) WHO As of 06:00 GMT, 46 countries have officially reported 12,954 cases of influenza A(H1N1) infection, including 92 deaths.

Argentina 14 Confirmed Cases. Total: 19.

Australia 61 confirmed cases.

Puerto Rico First confirmed case.

==== May 27 ====
(World Health Organization) WHO As of 06:00 GMT, 48 countries have officially reported 13,398 cases of influenza A(H1N1) infection, including 95 deaths

Argentina 37 cases confirmed.

Dominican Republic First two confirmed cases.

Greece confirmed two more cases.

Romania First confirmed case.

Singapore First confirmed case. A 22-year-old woman picked up the virus after visiting New York.

United Kingdom Two new cases confirmed. Total: 186.

Uruguay confirmed its first two cases.

==== May 28 ====
Australia 147 confirmed cases.

Singapore Three more cases confirmed. Total confirmed cases now stands at four.

United Kingdom Seventeen more confirmed cases. Total: 203.

Bolivia First 2 cases confirmed.

Venezuela First confirmed case.

==== May 29 ====
(World Health Organization) WHO As of 06:00 GMT, 53 countries have officially reported 15,510 cases of influenza A(H1N1) infection, including 99 deaths

United Kingdom 14 confirmed cases. Total: 217.

Norway One new confirmed case. Total: 5.

Hungary First confirmed case

Uruguay 4 new confirmed cases. Total: 6.

Greece Another one case confirmed. Total: 4.

==== May 30 ====
Estonia First confirmed case.

United States CDC FluView Week 21: Widespread influenza activity in five states, regional activity in 10.

==== May 31 ====
Dominican Republic Nine more cases confirmed, for a total of 11 cases nationwide.

=== June 2009 ===
==== June 1 ====
(World Health Organization) WHO As of 06:00 GMT, 62 countries have officially reported 17,410 cases of influenza A(H1N1) infection, including 115 deaths.

Bulgaria First confirmed case.

==== June 2 ====
Bermuda First case confirmed.

Egypt First case confirmed.

Luxembourg First case confirmed.

Nicaragua First case confirmed.

==== June 3 ====
(World Health Organization) WHO As of 06:00 GMT, 3 June 2009, 66 countries have officially reported 19,273 cases of influenza A(H1N1) infection, including 117 deaths.

Saudi Arabia First confirmed case.

==== June 4 ====
Barbados First confirmed case.

Malaysia Three more cases confirmed. One of the patients is a 23-year-old student returned from the United States. Another two patients are German tourists who arrived in Singapore after having gone to Malaysia for holiday. Total: 5.

Trinidad and Tobago First confirmed case.

==== June 5 ====
(World Health Organization) WHO As of 06:00 GMT, 69 countries have officially reported 21,940 cases of influenza A(H1N1) infection, including 125 deaths.

Australia 1006 cases confirmed.

Cayman Islands First case confirmed.

Dominican Republic First fatality, a 17-year-old pregnant girl. Total number of confirmed cases rises to 44.

Ukraine First confirmed case.

==== June 6 ====
Malaysia One more case confirmed. Total: 7.

United States CDC FluView Week 22: Widespread influenza activity in eight states, regional activity in nine. "Approximately 89% of all influenza viruses being reported to CDC were novel influenza A (H1N1) viruses."

==== June 7 ====
Chile Second death confirmed.

Martinique First case confirmed.

New Zealand Authorities have confirmed that a man traveling from North America has Influenza A(H1N1). Total: 14.

==== June 8 ====
(World Health Organization) WHO As of 06:00 GMT, 73 countries have officially reported 25,288 cases of influenza A(H1N1) infection, including 139 deaths.

Dominica First confirmed case.

New Zealand Three more confirmed cases, two of which were from international flights. Total: 17.

==== June 10 ====
(World Health Organization) WHO As of 06:00 GMT, 74 countries have officially reported 27,737 cases of influenza A(H1N1) infection, including 141 deaths.

Colombia First death confirmed.

French Polynesia First confirmed case in the islands.

Guatemala First death confirmed.

==== June 11 ====
(World Health Organization) The WHO raises its Pandemic Alert Level to Phase 6, citing significant transmission of the virus.

Australia 1263 cases nationally, with more than 1000 cases in the State of Victoria alone.

British Virgin Islands First case confirmed in the islands.

Cuba Sixth case on the island, and that of the first citizen.

(Palestine) Palestinian Territories First case confirmed in the West Bank.

==== June 12 ====
(World Health Organization) WHO As of 07:00 GMT, 12 June 2009, 74 countries have officially reported 29,669 cases of Influenza A (H1N1) infections, including 145 deaths.

Morocco First case confirmed.

Isle of Man First case confirmed.

==== June 13 ====
Bolivia First two domestic infections. Total: 7.

Malaysia One more confirmed case. Total: 12.

United States Widespread influenza activity in eleven states, regional activity in six. "Over 98% of all subtyped influenza A viruses being reported to CDC were pandemic influenza A (H1N1) viruses."

==== June 15 ====
Malaysia Five more cases of H1N1 confirmed. Total: 17.

United Kingdom First death confirmed.

==== June 16 ====
Sri Lanka First confirmed case.

==== June 17 ====
Monaco First confirmed case.

Malaysia Four more cases of H1N1 confirmed. One domestic infection confirmed. Total: 23.

==== June 19 ====
Antigua and Barbuda First confirmed case.

Bangladesh First confirmed case.

Ethiopia First two cases confirmed.

Slovenia First confirmed case.

==== June 22 ====
Philippines First death in Asia confirmed. H1N1 deaths now confirmed in 3 of 6 WHO regions.

==== June 24 ====
Iraq First seven cases confirmed.

Japan 52 more cases confirmed. Total: 944.

Serbia First confirmed case.

United States CDC FluView Week 24: Widespread influenza activity in twelve states, regional activity in seven. "Over 99% of all subtyped influenza A viruses being reported to CDC were pandemic influenza A (H1N1) viruses."

==== June 27 ====
United States CDC FluView Week 25: Widespread influenza activity in ten states, regional in 11 states.

==== June 29 ====
Bosnia and Herzegovina First case confirmed.

Denmark First case of Oseltamivir (Tamiflu) resistance found. Confirmed by David Reddy, Roche's pandemic taskforce leader.

Kenya First confirmed case.

Mauritius First case confirmed.

Nepal First three confirmed cases.

South Africa South Africa National Health Department confirm community outbreak, with 7 new confirmed cases. The total of confirmed cases grew to 12640 within South Africa over the next few months.

=== July 2009 ===
==== July 1 ====
Guam First case confirmed.

==== July 2 ====
Australia First confirmed death in NSW. National total: 10.

Japan Second case found with mutation resulting in Oseltamivir (Tamiflu) resistance.

==== July 4 ====
United States CDC FluView Week 26: Widespread influenza activity in nine states, regional influenza activity in 12. "Over 97% of all subtyped influenza A viruses being reported to CDC were novel influenza A (H1N1) viruses."

Portugal First human-to-human transmission. Total: 38.

Syria First case confirmed.

==== July 5 ====
Peru First two deaths confirmed.

==== July 6 ====
(World Health Organization) WHO 429 deaths worldwide are reported.

==== July 8 ====
Belize First five cases confirmed.

==== July 9 ====
Tanzania First case confirmed.

==== July 11 ====
United States CDC FluView Week 27: Widespread influenza activity in nine states, regional activity in 12. "Over 99% of all subtyped influenza A viruses being reported to CDC were novel influenza A (H1N1) viruses."

==== July 12 ====
Colombia 6th death case confirmed out of 165 infected

Malaysia 39 more cases confirmed. Total: 710.

United Kingdom Another 2 deaths confirmed. Total Deaths: 17.

==== July 13 ====
Brazil One more death confirmed. Total Deaths: 3.

Ecuador Third death confirmed. Total deaths: 3.

==== July 14 ====
Brazil Fourth death confirmed.

Malaysia 32 more cases confirmed. Total: 804

New Zealand Two more deaths confirmed. Total deaths 9. Total confirmed cases: 1,984.

==== July 16 ====
Singapore First flu-related death confirmed, that of a 49-year-old man with heart problems.

Sudan First two confirmed cases of H1N1 detected, from flights which had arrived from the U.K.

==== July 17 ====
Hawaii First death, that of a sexagenarian with underlying health problems.

==== July 18 ====
United States CDC FluView Week 28: Widespread influenza activity in seven states, regional activity in 13. "Over 99% of all subtyped influenza A viruses being reported to CDC were novel influenza A (H1N1) viruses."

Venezuela First death confirmed, that of an 11-year-old girl.

Singapore First death with H1N1 involvement confirmed, that of a 49-year-old male who also suffered from diabetes, hypertension and high cholesterol, from a heart attack caused by severe pneumonia.

==== July 19 ====
Egypt First death confirmed.

(Georgia (country)) Georgia First case confirmed.

==== July 20 ====
Albania First case confirmed.

Guam First death confirmed.

Namibia First two H1N1 cases confirmed.

==== July 21 ====
Canada The fourth case of mutation in the world from Tamiflu has been found in a 60-year-old man from Quebec, Canada.

Federated States of Micronesia First case confirmed, that of a 27-year-old male.

Northern Mariana Islands First two cases of H1N1 confirmed.

==== July 22 ====
Hungary First death confirmed, that of a man with underlying heart and lung disease.

Tonga First death confirmed.

==== July 23 ====
(World Health Organization) The WHO ceases the tracking of cumulative individual cases.

Arab League Health Ministers hold a summit after the death of a pilgrim who had returned from the Hajj. New regulations were promulgated for the Hajj: anyone younger than 12 or older than 65 or who have "chronic health problems" shall not be allowed to undertake the pilgrimage to Mecca.

Bhutan First case confirmed.

Malaysia First flu-related death confirmed, that of an obese 30-year-old male.

==== July 24 ====
Canada Nova Scotia reports its first H1N1 death.

Cayman Islands First death reported, that of a man with underlying medical conditions.

==== July 25 ====
Indonesia First H1N1 death confirmed, that of a 6-year-old girl suffering from severe pneumonia.

United States It is reported that thousands of Americans are being recruited for H1N1 vaccine testing at several research centers across the country. CDC FluView Week 29: Widespread influenza activity in four states, regional activity in eight. "Over 98% of all subtyped influenza A viruses being reported to CDC were novel influenza A (H1N1) viruses."

==== July 26 ====
Norway An international 4H youth camp with 1,700 participants from fifteen nations is shut down after fifty Norwegian participants catch H1N1.

==== July 27 ====
(World Health Organization) WHO 816 deaths worldwide are reported.

Germany Germany's federal infectious disease center, the Robert Koch Institute, states there were 3,810 confirmed cases of H1N1 in the country; nearly all of the cases are mild.

Israel First death confirmed, that of a 35-year-old man from Eilat.

Kosovo First case confirmed.

Saint Kitts and Nevis First death reported, that of a 28-year-old woman.

Saudi Arabia First death confirmed.

==== July 28 ====
Japan Third case of Oseltamivir (Tamiflu) resistance.

Thailand In the first reported case of vertical transmission of A(H1N1), a baby is born infected.

==== July 29 ====
(Eswatini) Swaziland First case confirmed.

United Kingdom The NHS is not ready for a second wave of swine flu cases expected this autumn, a House of Lords committee has stated. It warned hospitals do not have enough intensive care beds to cope, and furthermore predicted that the recently established A(H1N1) flu helpline could be overwhelmed with calls.

United States The U.S. military wants to establish regional teams of military personnel to assist civilian authorities in the event of a significant outbreak of the H1N1 virus this fall, according to Defense Department officials.

==== July 30 ====
Azerbaijan First two cases of A(H1N1) confirmed, those of people who had been on holiday in France and the U.K., respectively.

Belgium First death confirmed, that of a 34-year-old woman.

France First death confirmed, a 14-year-old girl in Brest.

Gabon First case confirmed.

Lebanon First death confirmed, that of a 30-year-old male.

Moldova First case confirmed.

Saudi Arabia Second H1N1 death confirmed, that a 28-year-old Indonesian woman.

Taiwan First death confirmed, that of a 39-year-old man.

==== July 31 ====
(World Health Organization) WHO 1,154 deaths worldwide are reported.

France The cruise ship Voyager of the Seas, which had reported dozens of cases of H1N1 flu amongst its 5,000 passengers and crew, docks in France.

=== August 2009 ===
==== August 1 ====
Australia First case of reverse zoonosis confirmed in a piggery in Dunedoo.

United States CDC FluView Week 30: Widespread influenza activity in four states, regional activity in 11. "Over 98% of all subtyped influenza A viruses being reported to CDC were novel influenza A (H1N1) viruses."

==== August 3 ====
South Africa First confirmed death in South Africa. Total number of deaths at end of epidemic 93.

==== August 4 ====
India First death confirmed.

Netherlands First death confirmed, that of a 17-year-old male.

Solomon Islands First case confirmed.

==== August 6 ====
(World Health Organization) WHO 1,462 deaths worldwide are reported.

==== August 8 ====
United States CDC FluView Week 31: Widespread influenza activity in four states, regional activity in 10.

==== August 11 ====
Costa Rica President Óscar Arias is confirmed to have swine flu, the first head of state known to have been infected.

==== August 13 ====
(World Health Organization) WHO 1,799 deaths worldwide are reported.

==== August 14 ====
Madagascar First case confirmed.

==== August 15 ====
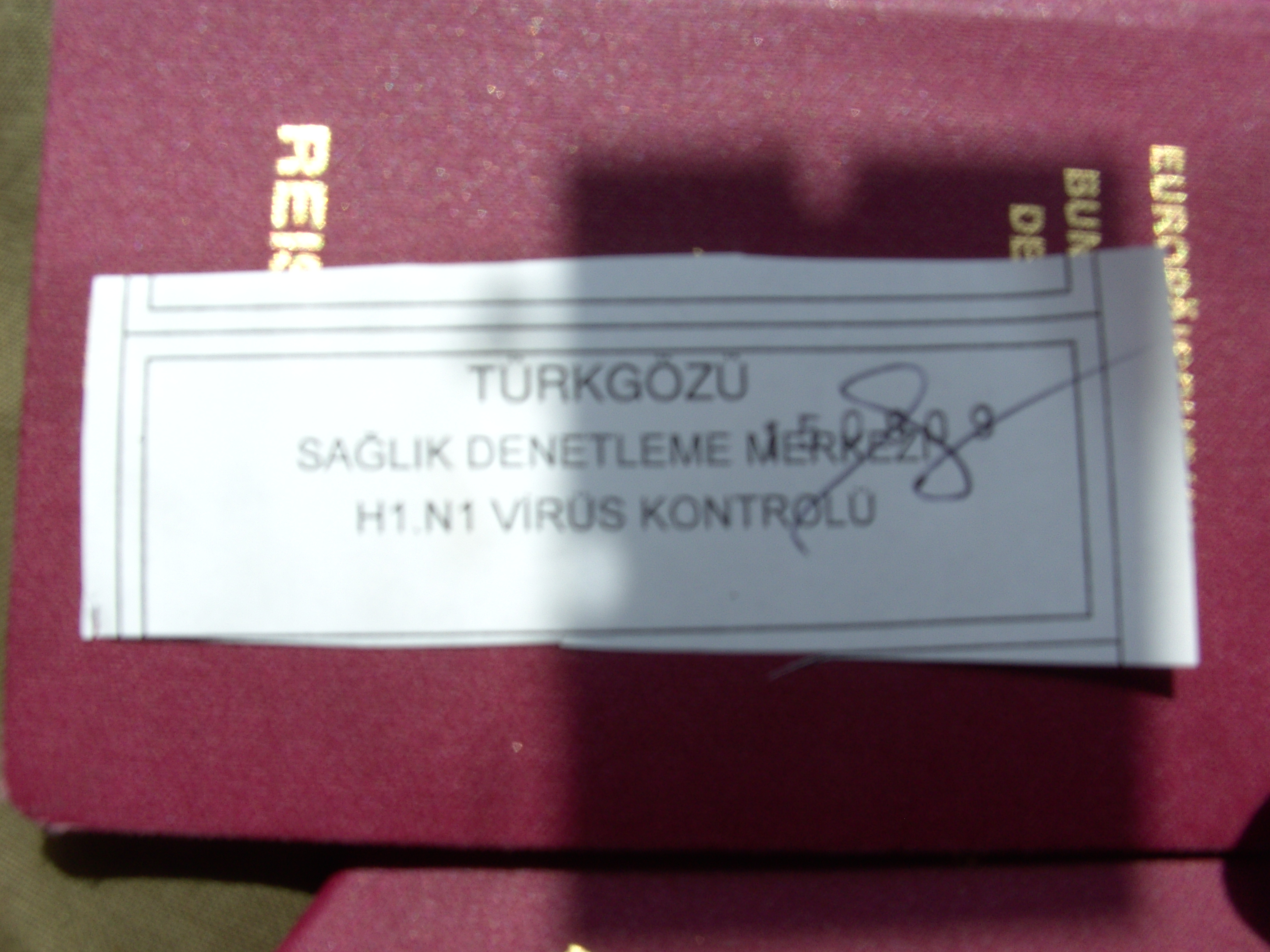
Turkish H1N1 control sheet, here on a German passport, issued in mid-August.

Democratic Republic of the Congo First H1N1 case confirmed.

United States CDC FluView Week 32: Widespread influenza activity in two states, regional activity in eight.

==== August 17 ====
Malaysia Two more deaths confirmed. Total: 64 deaths.

Malta First death confirmed.

==== August 18 ====
Malaysia Three more deaths confirmed. Total: 67 deaths.

==== August 19 ====
Belarus First H1N1 case confirmed.

==== August 20 ====
Kuwait First death confirmed.

Malaysia One more death confirmed. Total: 68 deaths. The unusually high reported death rate, four times the global average, is investigated by the WHO.

Netherlands Second death confirmed, that of a 58-year-old male.

==== August 21 ====
Chile H1N1 is found in turkeys on farms in Chile near the port city of Valparaiso in a unique zoonosis cluster.

Germany 13,740 A(H1N1) cases confirmed.

Oman First death confirmed.

United Arab Emirates First death confirmed.

United Kingdom First death confirmed in Northern Ireland, that of woman with underlying health conditions.

==== August 22 ====
New Caledonia First death confirmed.

United States CDC FluView Week 33: Widespread influenza activity in two states, regional activity in 13. Activity appears to be increasing in the Southeast.

==== August 23 ====
(World Health Organization) WHO At least 2,185 deaths worldwide are reported.

Greece First death confirmed.

==== August 24 ====
Germany 14,325 H1N1 cases confirmed.

Kyrgyzstan First two cases confirmed, that of a husband and wife; the man had recently traveled to Dubai.

Malaysia One more death confirmed. Total: 69 deaths.

==== August 25 ====
Malaysia One more death confirmed. Total: 70 deaths.

==== August 26 ====
Angola First case confirmed.

Germany 14,940 H1N1 cases confirmed.

Iran First death confirmed

Malaysia One more death confirmed. Total: 71 deaths.

Syria First death confirmed.

==== August 27 ====
UN;Chile The United Nations issues a warning regarding the discovery of H1N1-infected turkeys on farms in Chile, an unusual case of zoonosis which raises concerns about possible increased genetic reassortment of the virus.

==== August 28 ====
(World Health Organization) WHO Most countries in the Southern Hemisphere (represented by Chile, Argentina, New Zealand, and Australia) appear to have passed their peak of influenza activity and returned to baseline activity.

(European Union) ECDC Based partially on data from the Southern Hemisphere, the ECDC forecasts a first wave of infections in autumn and winter which stresses hospitals in particular; it is noted, however, that "the overall interruption of essential services in (well-prepared) countries has been manageable".

Germany 15,567 H1N1 cases confirmed.

==== August 29 ====
Bangladesh First death confirmed.

Brazil 602 H1N1 deaths confirmed, the highest number of any nation-state to date.

United States CDC FluView Week 34: Influenza activity, which had been largely stable or decreasing in prior weeks, increases in the U.S. "Six states and Puerto Rico reported geographically widespread influenza activity, 13 states reported regional influenza activity, 10 states and the District of Columbia reported local influenza activity, 19 states reported sporadic influenza activity, two states reported no influenza activity, and Guam and the U.S. Virgin Islands did not report." Furthermore, Region IV, i.e. the Southeast, reports increased out-patient ILI above its regional baseline.

==== August 30 ====
(World Health Organization) WHO At least 2,837 deaths worldwide are reported.

Colombia President Álvaro Uribe is confirmed to have swine flu, the second Head of state known to have been infected.

Djibouti First seven cases confirmed.

United Arab Emirates Second death confirmed, that of a thirty-year-old Pakistani expatriate who died following Caesarian section.

==== August 31 ====
Argentina The most H1N1 deaths per capita.

Bahrain First death confirmed, a South East Asian woman in her thirties with underlying medical conditions.

Sweden First death confirmed.

=== September 2009 ===
==== September 2 ====
Macau First death confirmed.

Portugal 5,123 cases officially confirmed

==== September 3 ====
Malaysia One more death confirmed. Total: 73 deaths.

Norway First death confirmed.

United States The CDC in its Morbidity and Mortality Weekly Report notes that 67% of thirty-six children who have died from H1N1 early in the epidemic had at least one serious chronic medical condition, with neurodevelopmental conditions such as developmental delay, epilepsy, and cerebral palsy being especially prominent. Roughly one in thirteen deaths have been of school-age children. More than 80% of the children who died were five or older, in contrast with the seasonal flu baseline of half or more of the influenza fatalities being four or younger.

==== September 4 ====
Italy First death confirmed.

==== September 5 ====
United States CDC FluView Week 35: Influenza increases in the U.S. with widespread influenza activity in 11 states and regional activity in 13; the proportion of outpatient visits for influenza-like illness (ILI) is above the national baseline, with four out of ten HHS Surveillance Regions reporting ILI above region-specific baselines. "97% of all subtyped influenza A viruses being reported to CDC were 2009 influenza A (H1N1) viruses."

==== September 6 ====
(World Health Organization) WHO At least 3,205 deaths worldwide are reported.

==== September 7 ====
Ecuador Ecuador's chief of presidential security, Col. John Merino, dies of H1N1 flu after twenty-eight days at Quito Military Hospital.

Faroe Islands First 44 cases confirmed.

Namibia First death confirmed, that of a 37-year-old businessman who had fallen ill in Angola.

==== September 8 ====
Suriname First death confirmed.

==== September 9 ====
Madagascar First death confirmed.

(United States) USA An outbreak is confirmed at the gaming convention PAX in Seattle, Washington.

==== September 10 ====
Malawi First case confirmed.

==== September 11 ====
Australia First case of Oseltamivir (Tamiflu) resistance found.

==== September 12 ====
United States CDC FluView Week 36: Influenza activity continues to increase with widespread influenza activity in twenty-one states, regional influenza activity in nine. Seven of ten HHS Surveillance Regions report ILI activity above region-specific baselines. "99% of all subtyped influenza A viruses being reported to CDC were 2009 influenza A (H1N1) viruses."

==== September 13 ====
(World Health Organization) WHO At least 3,486 deaths worldwide are reported.

==== September 14 ====
Mozambique First death confirmed, that of a 29-year-old female with an unspecified chronic illness.

==== September 17 ====
Malta Third death confirmed.

Netherlands The third and fourth deaths are confirmed, that of a 52-year-old man and an 85-year-old woman, respectively, both of whom had underlying medical conditions.

United Kingdom Health Minister Andy Burnham states that the second peak of swine flu has started as 5,000 people contracted the virus this week, compared to 3,000 the week before.

==== September 18 ====
Martinique First death confirmed, that of an 18-month-old girl.

==== September 19 ====
Malaysia One more death confirmed. Total: 77 deaths.

United States CDC FluView Week 37: Widespread influenza activity in twenty-six states, regional activity in 11. All of the HHS ILI regions report elevated levels of influenza activity above their region-specific baselines except for Region I (New England).

==== September 20 ====
(World Health Organization) WHO Over 3,917 deaths worldwide are reported.

==== September 21 ====
China A national vaccination campaign begins in China, making it the first country to issue the H1N1 vaccine.

United States The U.S. government orders a total of 251 million doses of H1N1 vaccine from manufacturers, up from the long-planned total of 195 million.

==== September 23 ====
Portugal The first death confirmed, that of a Portuguese man living in France.

==== September 25 ====
Germany First death confirmed, that of a 36-year-old woman who died of a so-called superinfection which included H1N1.

United States Forty-two schools are closed in eight states as the second wave of the pandemic begins in early autumn.

==== September 26 ====
United States CDC FluView Week 38: Widespread influenza activity in twenty-seven states, regional activity in 18.

==== September 27 ====
(World Health Organization) WHO At least 4,108 deaths worldwide are reported.

United States The second wave of the H1N1 pandemic begins to stress hospitals in the U.S. and prompts some school closures.

==== September 28 ====
Cambodia First death confirmed, in Phnom Penh.

==== September 29 ====
(Republic of Ireland) Ireland First case of reverse zoonosis in pigs.

==== September 30 ====
Australia Mass vaccination drive begins, the second in the world.

Bulgaria First death confirmed.

China Sinovac Biotech Ltd., the first company worldwide to complete clinical trials for a vaccine, receives an order for an additional 3 million doses of H1N1 vaccine from the PRC government, making for a total of 6.3 million doses.

United States 46 states and Washington, D.C. begin ordering what becomes by the next day a cumulative total of 1,378,200 doses of the nasal-spray Live Attenuated Influenza Vaccine (LAIV) for H1N1.

=== October 2009 ===
==== October 3 ====
United States CDC FluView Week 39: The proportion of deaths attributed to pneumonia and influenza (P&I) reaches the epidemic threshold with eight out of ten HHS ILI regions reporting region-specific ILI activity above region-specific baseline levels. Widespread influenza activity in thirty-seven states, regional activity in 11.

==== October 4 ====
(World Health Organization) WHO At least 4,525 deaths worldwide are reported.

Tajikistan First case confirmed.

United States The CDC's 2009–10 influenza season officially begins.

==== October 5 ====
United Nations Rich countries should make more vaccines available to poorer nations where the H1N1 virus is starting to hit, United Nations health officials said. They said increased readiness for swine flu was needed in developing countries with weaker medical systems and with large, young populations, who are most vulnerable to the disease. Some countries, such as the United States, Brazil and France, have agreed to make 10 percent of their national vaccine stockpile available to developing countries. Manufacturers have also donated about 150 million doses of vaccine.

==== October 6 ====
China First death confirmed, in Lhasa, Tibet.

Tanzania First death confirmed.

==== October 9 ====
Yemen Tamiflu resistance found.

==== October 10 ====
Cuba First deaths confirmed, that of three pregnant women.

United States CDC FluView Week 40: The proportion of deaths attributed to pneumonia and influenza (P&I) is officially above the epidemic threshold. Moreover, for the first time all 10 HHS ILI regions reported ILI above region-specific baseline levels. Widespread influenza activity in forty-one states, and regional activity in eight, with only one state—Hawaii—reporting local influenza activity.

==== October 11 ====
(World Health Organization) WHO At least 4,735 deaths worldwide are reported.

==== October 12 ====
Norway first case of reverse zoonosis detected in Nord-Trøndelag.

Rwanda First cases confirmed.

São Tomé and Príncipe First cases confirmed.

Sweden Mass vaccination begins.

Vietnam Three cases of Tamiflu resistance (which developed during hospital treatment) are confirmed. The resistant strains were apparently not transmitted, and all three patients survived.

==== October 13 ====
Mongolia First cases confirmed.

==== October 15 ====
India Six more deaths confirmed. Total: 405 deaths.

Trinidad and Tobago First death confirmed.

United Kingdom The death toll passes 100. Total confirmed deaths: 106. The NHS confirms that second wave of swine flu has begun, with cases in Wales and Northern Ireland being especially high. The Minister of Health confirms that there were 27,000 cases in the last week in England alone, up from 14,000 the week before. The Minister of Health also announced that 415,000 H1N1 vaccinations shall take place on the week beginning 21 October, then 5,000,000 more vaccinations the week after. 20% of all hospitalized cases are now critical, up from 12% the week before. The government believes it can get 50,000,000 Britons vaccinated before Christmas.

==== October 16 ====
United States An initial shortfall of swine flu vaccine is predicted shortly after the proportion of deaths attributed to pneumonia and influenza goes above the epidemic threshold in some states, with flu activity widespread in 41 states. It is also announced that the number cases, hospitalizations and deaths are unprecedented for this time of year, with flu-like illnesses accounting for 6.1% of all doctor visits, itself an unusually high number.

==== October 17 ====
(World Health Organization) WHO At least 4,999 deaths worldwide are reported.

China Second death confirmed, in the northwestern province of Qinghai.

United States CDC FluView Week 41: All 10 HHS ILI regions reported ILI above region-specific baseline levels. Widespread influenza activity in forty-six states, regional activity in three.

==== October 19 ====
United States H1N1 is confirmed in a nasal mucus sample taken from a show hog at the Minnesota State Fair in the first case of zoonosis in the country.

India Two more deaths confirmed. Total: 415 deaths.

Japan Mass vaccinations begin.

==== October 20 ====
Canada H1N1-infected turkeys are confirmed in Ontario, the second such case of zoonosis reported in the world.

Iceland First death confirmed.

United States In a unique case of zoonosis, a pet ferret in Oregon is confirmed to be infected with H1N1.

==== October 21 ====
Canada A turkey farm in Ontario province has been confirmed infected with A/H1N1 flu, making Canada the second country to report such infection after Chile, health officials confirmed

Japan Ten H1N1-infected pigs are discovered in a swine herd in Osaka Prefecture, the first reported case of zoonosis in Asia.

(United Kingdom) UK H1N1 vaccinations begin nationwide, with 14,000,000 high-priority people with conditions such as asthma to be vaccinated initially, then eventually up to 51,000,000 other Britons.

Serbia First death confirmed.

==== October 22 ====
Czech Republic First death confirmed.

Iraq Fears over the H1N1 virus prompts nearly 2,500 school closures.

==== October 23 ====
Germany Third H1N1 death confirmed.

Mongolia First death confirmed.

Netherlands Two new deaths reported, that of a 14-year-old girl and 40-year-old man. Total deaths: 6.

United States President Barack Obama declares a national emergency, stating "The potential exists for the pandemic to overburden health care resources in some localities."

==== October 24 ====
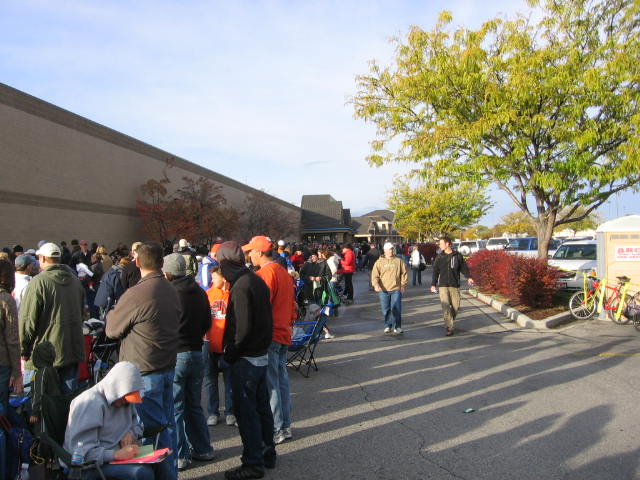
High-risk groups line up at a defunct Kmart for the first H1N1 vaccines publicly available in Boise, Idaho.

United States Various public health departments across the country run out of the H1N1 vaccine, due to the shortfall of 10 million doses as the national vaccination campaign gets underway in earnest; 40 million doses had initially been projected. According to the CDC's FluView Week 42, influenza activity is widespread in 48 states, with regional activity in just two: Hawaii and South Carolina.

==== October 25 ====
(World Health Organization) WHO At least 5,712 deaths worldwide are reported.

==== October 26 ====
China Another death confirmed, in the northwestern province of Xinjiang.

Oman Mass vaccinations begin.

==== October 27 ====
Canada Canada's H1N1 vaccination campaign begins.

Russia First two deaths confirmed, in the far eastern city of Chita.

Iceland First case of reverse zoonosis detected in pigs.

==== October 28 ====
Portugal A ten-year-old dies 48 hours after contracting the flu.

==== October 29 ====
H1N1 in Turkish Provinces by Late October
- Outbreak evolution in Turkey: Confirmed deaths Confirmed cases
- Disease: Swine flu
- Pathogen: H1N1
- First outbreak: Central Mexico
- Arrival date: 16 May 2009
- Confirmed cases: 12,316
- Deaths: 627

Afghanistan First death confirmed.

Nigeria First case confirmed.

(Republic of the Congo) Republic of Congo First case confirmed.

==== October 30 ====
(European Union) ECDC The European Centre for Disease Control reports a total of 302 fatal cases in Europe to date; all of the 27 EU and the four EFTA countries are reporting cases of pandemic (H1N1) 2009 influenza.

Ukraine First death confirmed. Meanwhile, Ukrainian Prime Minister Yulia Tymoshenko ordered a massive and for Ukraine unprecedented disease-control programme to go into effect immediately in an attempt to prevent the spread of the disease. A 'full quarantine' will be imposed in seven provinces of Western Ukraine, with police monitoring the entrance and exit of all persons. It will block those lacking justification for travel

==== October 31 ====
Croatia First death confirmed.

United States According to the CDC's FluView Week 43, influenza activity is widespread in 48 states, with regional activity in two: Hawaii and Mississippi.

=== November 2009 ===
==== November 1 ====
Afghanistan Schools are closed for three weeks after the first H1N1 death is recorded.

Kuwait Mass vaccinations begin.

Morocco Mass vaccinations begin.

==== November 2 ====
Turkey Mass vaccinations begin.

==== November 3 ====
(World Health Organization) WHO At least 6,071 deaths worldwide are reported.

Austria First death confirmed.

Belarus First death confirmed.

Egypt Mass vaccinations begin.

Qatar Mass vaccinations begin.

Slovenia First death confirmed.

(United States) US The USDA reports the first H1N1 zoonosis in commercial swine, in a herd in Indiana.

==== November 4 ====
Netherlands First case of Oseltamivir (Tamiflu) resistance found.

United States The first case in the world of H1N1 zoonosis in a cat is confirmed, in Iowa.

==== November 5 ====
San Marino First case confirmed.

==== November 6 ====
Bulgaria A nationwide epidemic is declared.

Hong Kong Reverse zoonosis is detected in two slaughtered pigs.

==== November 7 ====
Bahrain Mass vaccinations begin.

Belgium Mass vaccination begins.

Saudi Arabia Mass vaccinations begin.

United States CDC FluView Week 44: Widespread influenza activity in forty-six state, regional activity in four. "The proportion of outpatient visits for influenza-like illness (ILI) was 6.7% which is above the national baseline of 2.3%. All 10 regions reported ILI above region-specific baseline levels."

==== November 8 ====
Pakistan First death confirmed.

Sri Lanka First death confirmed.

==== November 9 ====
Latvia First death confirmed.

United Arab Emirates Mass vaccinations begin.

==== November 11 ====
Greenland First case confirmed.

Burundi First case confirmed.

==== November 12 ====
Armenia First two cases confirmed.

France Mass vaccination drive begins.

==== November 13 ====
(World Health Organization) WHO In its 74th update, the WHO reports early signs that the early flu season has peaked in North America, even as the pandemic intensifies across much of Europe and Central and Eastern Asia.

Bulgaria Health authorities confirm more than 12 people have died from H1N1 within a week; the latest victim is a 28-year-old man who died from respiratory failure.

Cyprus First death confirmed.

==== November 14 ====
Kosovo First death confirmed.

Poland First death confirmed.

United States CDC FluView Week 45: Widespread influenza activity in forty-three states, regional activity in seven. "The proportion of outpatient visits for influenza-like illness (ILI) was 5.5% which is above the national baseline of 2.3%. All 10 regions reported ILI above region-specific baseline levels."

==== November 16 ====
Tunisia First confirmed deaths.

Somalia First case confirmed.

(Bosnia and Herzegovina) Bosnia & Herzegovina First death confirmed.

North Korea First case confirmed.

Morocco First confirmed deaths.

Cyprus Mass vaccinations begin.

==== November 18 ====
Hungary National epidemic declared.

Lithuania First death confirmed.

(North Macedonia) Republic of Macedonia First death confirmed.

United States First feline death confirmed, in the state of Oregon.

==== November 19 ====
Maldives First death confirmed.

==== November 20 ====
Denmark First death confirmed.

Jordan Mass vaccinations begin.

Norway A potentially significant mutation is found in specimens taken of the H1N1 virus taken from two fatalities; a third victim was seriously ill.

(United Kingdom) UK The first person-to-person transmission of Tamiflu-resistant H1N1 in the world is confirmed at the University Hospital of Wales in Cardiff. Five patients are so infected, with three apparently having been infected in hospital in a case of iatrogenic transmission.

(United States) US An iatrogenic Tamiflu-resistant cluster is reported at Duke University Medical Center in North Carolina, with four severely ill cancer patients infected, the largest cluster in the U.S. More than fifty resistant cases have been reported in the world since April.

==== November 21 ====
United States CDC FluView Week 46: Widespread influenza activity in thirty-two states, regional activity in 17. "The proportion of outpatient visits for influenza-like illness (ILI) was 4.3% which is above the national baseline of 2.3%. All 10 regions reported ILI above region-specific baseline levels.

==== November 23 ====
Romania First death confirmed, that of a 43-year-old man with obesity, high blood pressure, and diabetes.

==== November 24 ====
United States First double infection case confirmed, in a pediatrician in West Virginia.

Montserrat First case confirmed.

==== November 27 ====
(World Health Organization) WHO H1N1 mutations have led to roughly 75 people worldwide developing Tamiflu resistance. Furthermore, the separate D222G or D225G mutation which helps the virus to reach deep into the lungs has been reported in cases both severe and mild in Norway, Ukraine, Brazil, China, Japan, Mexico and the United States.

France The H1N1 mutation first detected in Norway causes two deaths in separate French cities.

South Korea First double infection case confirmed, in a two-year-old girl.

==== November 28 ====
China Two cases in dogs are confirmed, the first instance of canine zoonosis in the world.

Indonesia First case in pigs is confirmed, in southwest Sulawesi.

United States CDC FluView Week 47: Widespread influenza activity, in Twenty-five states, regional influenza activity in 17. "The proportion of outpatient visits for influenza-like illness (ILI) was 3.7% which is above the national baseline of 2.3%. Eight of the 10 regions reported ILI at or above region-specific baseline levels. Regions 6 and 10 reported ILI below their region specific baselines."

==== November 30 ====
United States The CDC states that H1N1 may have peaked as the number of states reporting widespread influenza dropped from 43 the previous week to 32 this week. Furthermore, influenza-like illness now account for 4.3% of doctor visits, down from 8% four weeks ago (on average, influenza accounts for 2.5% of doctor visits). The proportion of deaths attributed to pneumonia and influenza continues to be higher than expected for this time of year, however. This proportion has remained elevated for eight weeks now.

Finland First case of reverse zoonosis in pigs.

Libya First death confirmed.

=== December 2009 ===
==== December 1 ====
Saudi Arabia Only five deaths and 73 cases are reported from the hajj.

==== December 2 ====
United Kingdom First case of reverse zoonosis in pigs is discovered, in Norfolk.

==== December 5 ====
(United States) US CDC FluView Week 48: Widespread flu activity in 14 states, regional activity in 25. "The proportion of deaths attributed to pneumonia and influenza (P&I) was above the epidemic threshold for the tenth consecutive week. The proportion of outpatient visits for influenza-like illness (ILI) was 2.7% which is above the national baseline of 2.3%."

==== December 6 ====
Gaza Strip First five cases are confirmed in the blockaded Gaza Strip.

Japan 100 fatalities confirmed.

United States With one in six Americans infected, or 15% of the country, nearly 10,000 have died to date, including 1,100 children and 7,500 younger adults. More than 200,000 Americans had been hospitalized to date — roughly the same number who are so affected by the regular seasonal flu variant in an entire year. Furthermore, with 12 million additional doses of H1N1 vaccine being released this week, several states begin to distribute the vaccine to the general public.

==== December 7 ====
North Korea First deaths are confirmed, according to newsletters released by the Seoul-based aid group Good Friends.

United States A sophisticated Bayesian analysis of public health data from April to the end of June from New York City and Milwaukee indicates that the pandemic's symptomatic case-fatality ratio has been far lower than the previous three pandemics of 1968, 1957, and 1918, making it to date the mildest pandemic on record.

==== December 12 ====
Afghanistan The 17th H1N1 fatality is reported.

Gaza The eighth fatality is reported, that of a child with underlying kidney failure, within a week of the first H1N1 case in the Gaza Strip.

United States CDC FluView Week 49: Widespread influenza activity in 11 states, regional activity in twenty. "The proportion of deaths attributed to pneumonia and influenza (P&I) was above the epidemic threshold for the eleventh consecutive week... The proportion of outpatient visits for influenza-like illness (ILI) was 2.6% which is above the national baseline of 2.3%. Five of the 10 regions reported ILI at or above region-specific baseline levels."

==== December 13 ====
(Georgia (country)) Georgia First fatality confirmed, that of a 27-year-old man.

Qatar Mass vaccinations begin.

==== December 16 ====
United States Roughly 100 million H1N1 vaccines become widely available to the general public in pharmacies in several American states as the supply increases and restrictions to high-risk groups are lifted.

==== December 17 ====
Thailand First confirmed case of H1N1 in a pig, in a case of reverse zoonosis in Saraburi Province. The pig recovered.

==== December 19 ====
United States CDC FluView Week 50: The CDC reports that levels of influenza are declining steadily, with only seven states reporting widespread influenza activity and 18 reporting regional activity; furthermore, the proportion of deaths attributed to pneumonia and influenza (P&I) is below the epidemic threshold. The CDC also notes that almost all isolates of H1N1 remain sensitive to oseltamivir. "The proportion of outpatient visits for influenza-like illness (ILI) was 2.3% which is at the national baseline of 2.3%."

==== December 21 ====
(United States) US First case of canine zoonosis confirmed. The 13-year-old dog from New York state was believed to have contracted the virus from his owner.

==== December 23 ====
(United States) US H1N1 is discovered at two North Carolina pig farms, making it the 10th state to identify the virus in animals. The swine caught the disease from infected workers and recovered after becoming moderately ill.

Argentina An Argentine study published in the New England Journal of Medicine shows that "Pediatric 2009 H1N1 influenza was associated with pediatric death rates that were 10 times the rates for seasonal influenza than in previous years," and that the elevated risk for pregnant women extends for as long as two weeks after they give birth.

==== December 26 ====
(United States) US CDC FluView Week 51: Influenza activity decreases slightly, although the proportion of deaths attributed to P&I remained above the epidemic threshold. "Four states reported geographically widespread influenza activity, 13 states reported regional influenza activity, the District of Columbia, Puerto Rico, and 19 states reported local influenza activity, Guam and 13 states reported sporadic influenza activity, and one state reported no influenza activity, the U.S. Virgin Islands did not report."

==== December 27 ====
(World Health Organization) WHO At least 12,220 deaths globally are formally confirmed. (By contrast, the WHO estimates that the seasonal flu kills from 250,000 to 300,000 people around the world each year.) Overall, the activity of the H1N1 pandemic has peaked.

Nepal First death confirmed, that of a woman who suffered major organ failure.

==== December 29 ====
(World Health Organization) WHO In Geneva Dr. Margaret Chan, Director-General of the WHO, remarks in the context of the H5N1 bird flu virus that "The fact that the long overdue influenza pandemic is so moderate in its impact is probably the best health news of the decade" but that "No, the world is not ready for a pandemic to be caused by H5N1." Given that H1N1 could still mutate, however, the WHO shall continue to monitor the pandemic for six months to a year. She also said that it would take at least two years before a true death total is established. (Approximately 11,500 people are believed to have died in more than 200 countries.)

==== December 30 ====
(United States) A study published in the New England Journal of Medicine finds that "household contacts less than 18 years of age were twice as susceptible to an acute respiratory illness as were those 19 to 50 years of age, whereas contacts older than 50 years were less susceptible".

==== December 31 ====
(United States) (United Kingdom) A joint US-UK study shows that children are twice as likely as adults to catch H1N1.

== 2010 ==
=== January 2010 ===
==== January 2 ====
United States CDC FluView Week 52: The proportion of deaths attributed to P&I falls below the epidemic threshold. No influenza activity is reported in Nebraska. "One state reported geographically widespread influenza activity, 12 states reported regional influenza activity, Puerto Rico, the District of Columbia, and 17 states reported local influenza activity, the U.S. Virgin Islands, Guam, 19 states reported sporadic influenza activity, and one state reported no influenza activity."

==== January 8 ====
United States The CDC reports that only Alabama reports widespread influenza activity.

==== January 11 ====
Mali First case confirmed.

==== January 15 ====
United States According to the CDC no states have reported widespread influenza activity.

==== January 29 ====
Chad First case confirmed.

Nigeria First death confirmed.

=== February 2010 ===
==== February 3 ====
Mauritania First case confirmed.

==== February 5 ====
United States The weekly report released by the CDC states that H1N1 activity has either remained stable or decreased over the past week in nine out of the ten regions of the United States. Furthermore, the proportion of deaths attributed to pneumonia and influenza, which technically remains above the epidemic threshold, has declined over the past week.

==== February 8 ====
Senegal First case confirmed

==== February 19 ====
United States According to the CDC, only three states have reported regional influenza activity: Alabama, Georgia, and South Carolina.

==== February 25 ====
Niger First case confirmed

=== March 2010 ===
==== March 5 ====
United States According to the CDC, only four states have reported regional influenza activity: Mississippi, Alabama, Georgia, and South Carolina.

==== March 12 ====
United States According to the CDC, five states have reported regional influenza activity: Mississippi, Alabama, Georgia, South Carolina, and Maine.

==== March 19 ====
United States According to the CDC, only three states have reported regional influenza activity: Mississippi, Alabama, and Georgia.

==== March 26 ====
United States According to the CDC, only three states have reported regional influenza activity: Alabama, Georgia, and South Carolina.

==== March 27 ====
Cuba Mass vaccination begins.

==== March 31 ====
United States The CDC Morbidity and Mortality Weekly Report states that inoculation rates varied, with the highest rates in New England and the lowest in the South. (E.g., roughly 39% of the population of Rhode Island is immunized vis-à-vis 13% that of Mississippi.) Among children Georgia had the lowest vaccination rate, with 21%; the state currently has the highest level of H1N1 flu activity.

=== April 2010 ===
==== April 2 ====
(United States) US According to the CDC, only three states have reported regional influenza activity: Alabama, Georgia, and South Carolina.

Cambodia Mass vaccinations begin.

==== April 9 ====
(United States) US According to the CDC, only three states have reported regional influenza activity: Alabama, Georgia, and South Carolina.

==== April 12 ====
Guinea First case confirmed.

==== April 14 ====
(World Health Organization) WHO An external panel advises against winding down the pandemic alert level until experts have tracked the southern hemisphere's traditional autumn and winter flu season. Accusations of undue influence from the pharmaceutical industry were also addressed.

==== April 17 ====
(United States) US According to the CDC, no states have reported either widespread or regional influenza activity, and four have reported local activity: Hawaii, Alabama, Georgia, and South Carolina.

==== April 19 ====
(World Health Organization) WHO Director-General Dr. Margaret Chan states that "It is still premature and too early for us to say we have come to an end of the pandemic influenza worldwide. It would be prudent and appropriate... to continue to monitor the evolution of this pandemic for the next six to 12 months," i.e. possibly into 2011. She also remarked that although the United States, Britain and Canada have passed through a second wave of H1N1, outbreaks in India, Egypt and elsewhere are intensifying, and reiterates that countries remain ill-prepared for a bird flu (H5N1) pandemic. More than 200 countries have now been affected by H1N1 with almost 12,000 confirmed deaths worldwide, although the vast majority of those infected recovered without special treatment.

==== April 26 ====
Philippines Mass vaccinations begin.

=== May 2010 ===
==== May 16 ====
(World Health Organization) WHO Director-General Dr. Margaret Chan states at the U.N.'s World Health Assembly that "We are just plain lucky ... This has been the case with the A/ H1N1 influenza pandemic... The virus did not mutate to a more lethal form. Cases of resistance to oseltamivir remained few and isolated. The vaccine closely matched circulating viruses and showed an excellent safety record," Chan said. "Emergency wards and intensive care units were often strained, few health systems were overwhelmed ... Schools closed, but borders remained open, and disruptions to travel and trade were far less severe than feared," she told delegates from the agency's 193 member states. "Had things gone wrong in any of these areas, we would have a very different agenda before us today," she added."

=== August 2010 ===
==== August 6 ====
(United States) US Researchers discover the mutation which had enabled the pandemic.

==== August 10 ====
(World Health Organization) WHO Director-General Margaret Chan officially declares the H1N1 pandemic over as countries are now seeing a mix of H1N1, H3N2, and B viruses, with some populaces displaying community-level immunity to H1N1 of 20% to 40%. Nevertheless, Angus Nicoll of the European Centre for Disease Prevention and Control urged health officials worldwide to "prepare for a new type of seasonal flu to appear in the near future that will combine elements of the pandemic A(H1N1) strain, and older A(H3N2) strain and several lesser strains". "Pandemics are unpredictable and prone to deliver surprises," Director-General Chan noted.

== See also ==
- 2009 flu pandemic timeline summary
- 2009 flu deaths by region
