= 2009 swine flu pandemic timeline summary =

Community outbreaks, June 2009

Confirmed cases by state, June 3, 2009

This article covers the chronology of the 2009 novel influenza A (H1N1) pandemic. Flag icons denote the first announcements of confirmed cases by the respective nation-states, their first deaths (and other major events such as their first intergenerational cases, cases of zoonosis, and the start of national vaccination campaigns), and relevant sessions and announcements of the World Health Organization (WHO), the European Union (and its agency the European Centre for Disease Prevention and Control), and the U.S. Centers for Disease Control (CDC).

Unless otherwise noted, references to terms like S-OIV, H1N1 and such, all refer to this new A(H1N1) strain and not to sundry other strains of H1N1 which are endemic in humans, birds and pigs.

== Summary ==
2009	A(H1N1) Outbreak and Pandemic Milestones
17 March	(Mexico) First case in the world of what was later identified as swine flu origin.
28 March	(United States) First country's case affected the disease in the US of what was later identified as swine flu origin.
12 April	(Mexico) First known death due to what was later identified as swine flu origin.
24 April	First Diseases Outbreak Notice mention of the Swine Flu by the World Health Organization.
25 April	The United States is the first country to have Community outbreaks confirmed.
25 April	Community outbreaks confirmed in Mexico.
27 April	First case confirmed in Canada.
27 April	First case confirmed in Spain.
27 April	First case confirmed in the United Kingdom.
28 April	First case confirmed in Israel.
28 April	First case confirmed in New Zealand.
29 April	First death confirmed in the United States.
29 April	First case confirmed in Germany.
29 April	First case confirmed in Austria.
30 April	First case confirmed in the Netherlands.
30 April	First case confirmed in Switzerland.
30 April	(Republic of Ireland) First case confirmed in Ireland.
1 May	First case confirmed in Hong Kong, China.
1 May	First case confirmed in Denmark.
1 May	First case confirmed in France.
2 May	First case confirmed in Italy.
2 May	First case confirmed in South Korea.
2 May	First case confirmed in Costa Rica.
3 May	First case confirmed in Colombia.
3 May	First case confirmed in Portugal.
3 May	First human-to-animal transmission of the virus in Canada
4 May	First case confirmed in El Salvador.
5 May	First case confirmed in Guatemala.
6 May	First case confirmed in Poland.
6 May	First case confirmed in Sweden.
7 May	First case confirmed in Argentina.
7 May	First case confirmed in Brazil.
7 May	First death confirmed in Canada.
7 May	First case of zoonosis in Canada, where an infected pig infects a human
8 May	First case confirmed in Japan.
8 May	First case confirmed in Panama.
8 May	Community outbreaks confirmed in Canada.
9 May	First case confirmed in Australia.
9 May	First case confirmed in Norway.
9 May	First death confirmed in Costa Rica.
10 May	First case confirmed in China.
12 May	First case confirmed in Thailand.
12 May	First case confirmed in Cuba.
12 May	First case confirmed in Finland.
13 May	First case confirmed in Belgium.
13 May	Community outbreaks confirmed in Costa Rica.
14 May	First case confirmed in Peru.
15 May	First case confirmed in Malaysia.
15 May	First case confirmed in Ecuador.
16 May	First case confirmed in India.
16 May	First case confirmed in Turkey.
17 May	First case confirmed in Chile.
17 May	Community outbreaks confirmed in Japan.
18 May	First case confirmed in Greece.
19 May	First case confirmed in Paraguay.
19 May	First case confirmed in Taiwan.
21 May	First case confirmed in the Philippines.
22 May	First case confirmed in Honduras.
22 May	First case confirmed in Russia.
23 May	First case confirmed in Iceland.
24 May	First case confirmed in Kuwait.
24 May	First case confirmed in United Arab Emirates.
25 May	First case confirmed in Bahrain.
25 May	First case confirmed in Czech Republic.
26 May	First case confirmed in Puerto Rico.
26 May	Community outbreaks confirmed in United Kingdom.
27 May	First case confirmed in Romania.
27 May	First case confirmed in Singapore.
27 May	First case confirmed in Dominican Republic.
27 May	First case confirmed in Uruguay.
28 May	First case confirmed in Bolivia.
28 May	First case confirmed in Venezuela.
28 May	First case confirmed in Slovakia.
28 May	Community outbreaks confirmed in Argentina.
28 May	Community outbreaks confirmed in Australia.
29 May	First case confirmed in Hungary.
30 May	First case confirmed in Cyprus.
30 May	First case confirmed in Estonia.
30 May	First case confirmed in Lebanon.
30 May	Community outbreaks confirmed in Chile.
31 May	First case confirmed in Vietnam.
31 May	(The Bahamas) First case confirmed in Bahamas.
31 May	Community outbreaks confirmed in Germany.
1 June	First case confirmed in Bulgaria.
2 June	First death confirmed in Chile.
2 June	First case confirmed in Luxembourg.
2 June	First case confirmed in Ukraine.
2 June	First case confirmed in Nicaragua.
2 June	First case confirmed in Egypt.
2 June	First case confirmed in Bermuda.
3 June	First case confirmed in Saudi Arabia.
3 June	First case confirmed in Barbados.
3 June	First case confirmed in Jamaica.
4 June	First case confirmed in Trinidad and Tobago.
5 June	First death confirmed in Dominican Republic.
5 June	First case confirmed in Cayman Islands.
5 June	Community outbreaks confirmed in Switzerland.
7 June	First case confirmed in Martinique.
8 June	First case confirmed in Dominica.
9 June	First death confirmed in Colombia.
10 June	First death confirmed in Guatemala.
10 June	First case confirmed in French Polynesia.
10 June	Community outbreaks confirmed in Guatemala.
11 June	(World Health Organization) The WHO raises its Pandemic Alert Level to Phase 6.
11 June	(Palestine) First case confirmed in the Palestinian Territories.
11 June	First case confirmed in British Virgin Islands.
11 June	Community outbreaks confirmed in Hong Kong.
12 June	First case confirmed in Morocco.
12 June	First case confirmed in Isle of Man.
12 June	Community outbreaks confirmed in Uruguay.
14 June	First death confirmed in the United Kingdom.
14 June	Community outbreaks confirmed in Philippines.
15 June	First death confirmed in Argentina.
16 June	First case confirmed in Jordan.
16 June	First case confirmed in Qatar.
16 June	First case confirmed in Samoa.
16 June	First case confirmed in Sri Lanka.
16 June	First case confirmed in Suriname.
16 June	First case confirmed in Yemen.
16 June	Community outbreaks confirmed in Thailand.
17 June	First case confirmed in Monaco.
17 June	(United States Virgin Islands) First case confirmed in U.S. Virgin Islands.
17 June	First case confirmed in Netherlands Antilles.
17 June	First case confirmed in Oman.
17 June	Community outbreaks confirmed in Malaysia.
17 June	Community outbreaks confirmed in France.
18 June	First case confirmed in Laos.
18 June	(Macau) First case confirmed in Macao.
18 June	First case confirmed in South Africa. H1N1 now present in all WHO regions.
18 June	First case confirmed in Papua New Guinea.
18 June	First case confirmed in the island of Jersey.
19 June	First death confirmed in Australia.
19 June	First case confirmed in Antigua and Barbuda.
19 June	First case confirmed in Bangladesh.
19 June	First case confirmed in Ethiopia.
19 June	First case confirmed in Slovenia.
20 June	First case confirmed in Algeria.
20 June	Community outbreaks confirmed in Venezuela.
21 June	First case confirmed in Fiji.
21 June	First case confirmed in Brunei.
22 June	First death confirmed in the Philippines.
22 June	First case confirmed in Iran.
22 June	First case confirmed in Montenegro.
22 June	First case confirmed in Tunisia.
22 June	First death confirmed in Honduras.
23 June	First case confirmed in Latvia.
23 June	(Macau) Community outbreaks confirmed in Macao.
24 June	First case confirmed in Indonesia.
24 June	First case confirmed in Cape Verde Islands.
24 June	(Ivory Coast) First case confirmed in Côte d'Ivoire.
24 June	First case confirmed in Cambodia.
24 June	First case confirmed in Iraq.
24 June	First case confirmed in Serbia.
24 June	First case confirmed in Vanuatu.
25 June	First human-to-animal transmission of the virus in Argentina.
26 June	First case confirmed in Lithuania.
26 June	First case confirmed in Guernsey.
26 June	Community outbreaks confirmed in China.
27 June	First case confirmed in Myanmar.
27 June	First case confirmed in New Caledonia.
27 June	First death confirmed in Thailand.
28 June	First death confirmed in Brazil.
29 June	First death confirmed in Spain.
29 June	First death confirmed in Uruguay.
29 June	First case of Oseltamivir (Tamiflu) resistance from Denmark found in the world.
29 June	First case confirmed in Bosnia and Herzegovina.
29 June	First case confirmed in Kenya.
29 June	First case confirmed in Mauritius.
29 June	First case confirmed in Nepal.
29 June	Community outbreaks confirmed in Italy.
29 June	Community outbreaks confirmed in Singapore.
30 June	First case confirmed in Saint Lucia.
30 June	Community outbreaks confirmed in Egypt.
30 June	First case of Oseltamivir (Tamiflu) resistance found in Chile.
1 July	First case confirmed in Guam.
1 July	First case confirmed in Malta.
1 July	Community outbreaks confirmed in South Korea.
2 July	First death confirmed in Brunei.
2 July	First death confirmed in Paraguay.
2 July	First case of Oseltamivir (Tamiflu) resistance found in Japan.
2 July	First case confirmed in Uganda.
2 July	First case confirmed in Saint Vincent and the Grenadines.
3 July	First case of Oseltamivir (Tamiflu) resistance found in Hong Kong, China.
3 July	First case confirmed in Aruba.
3 July	First death confirmed in El Salvador.
4 July	First death confirmed in New Zealand.
4 July	First case confirmed in Croatia.
4 July	(North Macedonia) First case confirmed in Macedonia.
4 July	First case confirmed in Syria.
4 July	Community outbreaks confirmed in Spain.
5 July	First death confirmed in Peru.
5 July	First case confirmed in Palau
6 July	(France) First case confirmed in Guadeloupe.
6 July	First case confirmed in Libya.
6 July	(France) First case confirmed in Saint Martin.
6 July	First death confirmed in Jamaica.
7 July	First case confirmed in Guyana.
7 July	First case confirmed in Belize.
7 July	First case confirmed in Cook Islands.
7 July	Community outbreaks confirmed in Portugal.
8 July	First case confirmed in Afghanistan.
8 July	First case confirmed in Seychelles.
8 July	Community outbreaks confirmed in Malta.
9 July	First case confirmed in Tanzania.
9 July	Community outbreaks confirmed in Panama.
10 July	First case confirmed in Botswana.
10 July	(France) First case confirmed in Réunion.
10 July	First case confirmed in Zimbabwe.
10 July	First death confirmed in Bolivia.
10 July	First death confirmed in Ecuador.
10 July	First death confirmed in Hong Kong.
11 July	First case confirmed in Andorra.
11 July	Community outbreaks confirmed in New Zealand.
13 July	Community outbreaks confirmed in Saudi Arabia.
14 July	First case confirmed in Haiti.
14 July	First case confirmed in Marshall Islands.
14 July	First case confirmed in Saint Kitts and Nevis.
14 July	First death confirmed in Puerto Rico.
15 July	First case confirmed in Tonga.
16 July	First case confirmed in Sudan.
16 July	First death confirmed in Singapore.
16 July	Community outbreaks confirmed in Brazil.
16 July	Community outbreaks confirmed in Morocco.
16 July	Community outbreaks confirmed in Colombia.
18 July	First death confirmed in Venezuela.
19 July	(Georgia (country)) First case confirmed in Georgia.
19 July	First death confirmed in Egypt.
19 July	First death confirmed in Panama.
19 July	Community outbreaks confirmed in Israel.
20 July	First death confirmed in Guam.
20 July	First case confirmed in Albania.
20 July	First case confirmed in Namibia.
20 July	Community outbreaks confirmed in Norway.
21 July	First case confirmed in Federated States of Micronesia.
21 July	First case confirmed in Northern Mariana Islands.
21 July	First case of Oseltamivir (Tamiflu) resistance found in Canada.
21 July	Community outbreaks confirmed in Indonesia.
22 July	First death confirmed in Hungary.
22 July	First death confirmed in Laos.
22 July	First death confirmed in Tonga.
22 July	Community outbreaks confirmed in India.
22 July	(Republic of Ireland) Community outbreaks confirmed in Ireland.
22 July	Community outbreaks confirmed in Peru.
22 July	Community outbreaks confirmed in Vietnam.
22 July	Community outbreaks confirmed in Jamaica.
23 July	First death confirmed in Malaysia.
23 July	First case confirmed in American Samoa.
23 July	First case confirmed in Bhutan.
23 July	First case confirmed in Kazakhstan.
23 July	First case confirmed in Turks and Caicos Islands.
23 July	Community outbreaks confirmed in Bolivia.
23 July	Community outbreaks confirmed in Sweden.
24 July	Community outbreaks confirmed in Fiji.
24 July	First case confirmed in the Falkland Islands.
24 July	First case confirmed in Gibraltar.
24 July	First case confirmed in Grenada.
24 July	First case confirmed in Maldives.
25 July	Community outbreaks confirmed in Brunei.
25 July	Community outbreaks confirmed in Ecuador.
25 July	Community outbreaks confirmed in El Salvador.
25 July	Community outbreaks confirmed in Greece.
25 July	Community outbreaks confirmed in Nicaragua.
25 July	Community outbreaks confirmed in South Africa.
25 July	Community outbreaks confirmed in Taiwan.
25 July	First death confirmed in Indonesia.
26 July	Community outbreaks confirmed in Cuba.
26 July	Community outbreaks confirmed in Cyprus.
26 July	Community outbreaks confirmed in Honduras.
26 July	Community outbreaks confirmed in Paraguay.
26 July	Community outbreaks confirmed in Turkey.
27 July	Community outbreaks confirmed in Denmark.
27 July	Community outbreaks confirmed in Netherlands.
27 July	Community outbreaks confirmed in United Arab Emirates.
27 July	First death confirmed in Israel.
27 July	First death confirmed in Saint Kitts and Nevis.
27 July	First death confirmed in Saudi Arabia.
27 July	First case confirmed in Kosovo.
27 July	First case confirmed in Zambia.
28 July	First case of Oseltamivir (Tamiflu) resistance found in Argentina.
29 July	(Eswatini) First case confirmed in Swaziland.
30 July	First case confirmed in Azerbaijan.
30 July	First case confirmed in Gabon.
30 July	First case confirmed in Moldova.
30 July	First death confirmed in Belgium.
30 July	First death confirmed in France.
30 July	First death confirmed in Lebanon.
30 July	First death confirmed in Taiwan.
31 July	(France) First case confirmed in French Guiana.
31 July	First case confirmed in Nauru.
31 July	First death confirmed in Qatar.
31 July	First case of zoonosis in Brazil, where an infected pig infects a human.
2 August	First death confirmed in India.
3 August	First death confirmed in South Africa.
3 August	(United Kingdom) First case confirmed in Akrotiri and Dhekelia.
3 August	First case confirmed in Pakistan.
4 August	First case confirmed in Solomon Islands.
4 August	First death confirmed in Vietnam.
4 August	First death confirmed in Netherlands.
5 August	First death confirmed in Iran.
5 August	First case confirmed in Anguilla.
6 August	First case confirmed in Ghana.
6 August	First case confirmed in Kiribati.
6 August	First case confirmed in Liechtenstein.
7 August	(Republic of Ireland) First death confirmed in Ireland.
7 August	First death confirmed in Palestine.
7 August	First death confirmed in Samoa.
8 August	First case of Oseltamivir (Tamiflu) resistance found in Thailand.
9 August	Community outbreaks confirmed in Algeria.
9 August	First death confirmed in Iraq.
10 August	First death confirmed in Mauritius.
12 August	(Timor-Leste) First case confirmed in East Timor.
12 August	First case confirmed in Wallis and Futuna.
12 August	First death confirmed in Nicaragua.
12 August	First case of Oseltamivir (Tamiflu) resistance found in Brazil.
14 August	First case confirmed in Cameroon.
14 August	First case confirmed in Madagascar.
14 August	First case of Oseltamivir (Tamiflu) resistance found in China.
14 August	First case of Oseltamivir (Tamiflu) resistance found in Singapore.
14 August	First case of Oseltamivir (Tamiflu) resistance found in United States.
15 August	First case of Oseltamivir (Tamiflu) resistance found in Peru.
15 August	First death confirmed in Japan.
15 August	First death confirmed in South Korea.
15 August	First case confirmed in the Democratic Republic of the Congo.
17 August	First case confirmed in Mozambique.
18 August	First death confirmed in Malta.
18 August	First death confirmed in Cook Islands.
18 August	First death confirmed in Yemen.
19 August	First case confirmed in Belarus.
20 August	First death confirmed in Kuwait.
20 August	First death confirmed in United Arab Emirates.
21 August	First cases in birds in the world confirmed in Chile.
21 August	First death confirmed in Oman.
22 August	First death confirmed in New Caledonia.
23 August	First death confirmed in Greece.
24 August	First death confirmed in French Polynesia.
24 August	First case confirmed in Kyrgyzstan.
26 August
26 August	First death confirmed in Syria.
26 August	First human-to-animal transmission of the virus in Brazil.
26 August	First case confirmed in Angola.
28 August	First cases in birds confirmed in Brazil.
29 August	First death confirmed in Bangladesh.
30 August	First head of state to have swine flu confirmed in Colombia
31 August	First case confirmed in Djibouti.
31 August	First death confirmed in Sweden.
31 August	First death confirmed in Bahrain.
1 September	First case confirmed in Lesotho.
1 September	(Réunion) First death confirmed in Reunion.
2 September	First death confirmed in Macau.
3 September	First death confirmed in Norway.
3 September	First death confirmed in Marshall Islands.
3 September	(United States Virgin Islands) First death confirmed in U.S. Virgin Islands.
4 September	First death confirmed in Italy.
7 September	First death confirmed in Namibia.
7 September	Ecuador's Chief of Presidential Security John Merino dies.
7 September	First case confirmed in Faroe Islands.
8 September	First death confirmed in Suriname.
9 September	First death confirmed in Madagascar.
10 September	First case confirmed in Malawi.
10 September	First case of Oseltamivir (Tamiflu) resistance found in Israel.
10 September	First Oseltamivir (Tamiflu) resistance spread from person to person found in the United States in the world.
11 September	First case of Oseltamivir (Tamiflu) resistance found in Australia.
14 September	First death confirmed in Mozambique.
15 September	First death confirmed in Solomon Islands.
17 September	First death confirmed in Luxembourg.
18 September	First death confirmed in Martinique.
21 September	Mass vaccinations, which are the first ones in the world, begin in China.
23 September	First death confirmed in Portugal.
23 September	(The Bahamas) First death confirmed in Bahamas.
25 September	First death confirmed in Germany.
28 September	First death confirmed in Cambodia.
29 September	(Republic of Ireland) First human-to-animal transmission of the virus in Ireland.
30 September	First death confirmed in Bulgaria.
30 September	First death confirmed in Barbados.
30 September	(China) First completed clinical trials by a company for 2009/H1N1 vaccine in the world.
30 September	Mass vaccinations begin in Australia.
1 October	(Saint Barthélemy) First case confirmed in Saint-Barthélemy.
4 October	First case confirmed in Tajikistan.
6 October	First death confirmed in China.
6 October	First death confirmed in Tanzania.
10 October	First death confirmed in Cuba.
12 October	First case of Oseltamivir (Tamiflu) resistance found in Vietnam.
12 October	First death confirmed in Jordan.
12 October	First case confirmed in Rwanda.
12 October	First case confirmed in São Tomé and Príncipe.
12 October	Mass vaccinations begin in Sweden.
12 October	First human-to-animal transmission of the virus in Norway.
13 October	First case confirmed in Mongolia.
15 October	First death confirmed in Trinidad and Tobago.
18 October	First death confirmed in Sudan.
19 October	Mass vaccinations begin in Japan.
20 October	First death confirmed in Iceland.
20 October	First cases in ferrets confirmed in the United States in the world.
21 October	First cases in birds confirmed in Canada.
21 October	First death confirmed in Serbia.
21 October	Mass vaccinations begin in the United Kingdom.
21 October	First human-to-animal transmission of the virus in Japan.
22 October	First death confirmed in Czech Republic.
22 October	First death confirmed in Guadeloupe.
23 October	First death confirmed in Mongolia.
24 October	First death confirmed in Finland.
25 October	First death confirmed in São Tomé and Príncipe.
25 October	First death confirmed in Turkey.
26 October	First death confirmed in Moldova.
26 October	Mass vaccinations begin in Oman.
27 October	Mass vaccinations begin in Canada.
27 October	Mass vaccinations begin in South Korea.
27 October	First death confirmed in Russia.
27 October	First human-to-animal transmission of the virus in the Iceland.
29 October	First death confirmed in Afghanistan.
29 October	First case confirmed in the Republic of the Congo.
29 October	First case confirmed in Nigeria.
30 October	First death confirmed in Ukraine.
31 October	First death confirmed in Croatia.
1 November	(Republic of Ireland) Mass vaccinations begin in Ireland.
1 November	Mass vaccinations begin in Kuwait.
1 November	Mass vaccinations begin in Morocco.
2 November	First death confirmed in Austria.
2 November	Mass vaccinations begin in Turkey.
3 November	First death confirmed in Belarus.
3 November	First death confirmed in Slovenia.
3 November	Mass vaccinations begin in Singapore.
3 November	Mass vaccinations begin in Egypt.
3 November	First cases in ferrets confirmed in Brazil.
4 November	First feline zoonosis confirmed in the United States in the world.
4 November	First case of Oseltamivir (Tamiflu) resistance found in Belarus.
4 November	First case of Oseltamivir (Tamiflu) resistance found in the Netherlands.
5 November	First death confirmed in Saint Lucia.
5 November	First case confirmed in San Marino.
6 November	First death confirmed in Slovakia.
6 November	First death confirmed in Pakistan.
6 November	First human-to-animal transmission of the virus in Hong Kong.
7 November	First death confirmed in Sri Lanka.
7 November	Mass vaccinations begin in Belgium.
7 November	Mass vaccinations begin in Bahrain.
7 November	Mass vaccinations begin in Saudi Arabia.
8 November	First case confirmed in Armenia.
9 November	First death confirmed in Latvia.
11 November	First case confirmed in Burundi.
11 November	First case confirmed in Greenland.
12 November	Mass vaccinations begin in France.
12 November	First feline zoonosis confirmed in Brazil.
13 November	First death confirmed in Cyprus.
13 November	First death confirmed in Poland.
14 November	First death confirmed in Kosovo.
14 November	First death confirmed in Switzerland.
16 November	First case confirmed in North Korea.
16 November	First case confirmed in Somalia.
16 November	First death confirmed in Tunisia.
16 November	First death confirmed in Morocco.
16 November	First death confirmed in Bosnia and Herzegovina.
16 November	Mass vaccinations begin in Greece.
16 November	Mass vaccinations begin in Spain.
16 November	Mass vaccinations begin in Cyprus.
17 November	First death confirmed in Falkland Islands.
17 November	First death confirmed in Maldives.
18 November	First death confirmed in Lithuania.
18 November	(North Macedonia) First death confirmed in Macedonia.
18 November	First case of Oseltamivir (Tamiflu) resistance found in Finland.
18 November	First case of Oseltamivir (Tamiflu) resistance found in Slovenia.
19 November	First feline death confirmed in the United States in the world.
20 November	First case of Oseltamivir (Tamiflu) resistance found in the United Kingdom.
20 November	First mutation ( D222G ) confirmed in Norway in the world.
20 November	First death confirmed in Denmark.
20 November	Mass vaccinations begin in Jordan.
23 November	First death confirmed in Estonia.
23 November	First death confirmed in Romania.
23 November	Mass vaccinations begin in Netherlands.
23 November	Mass vaccinations begin in Czech Republic.
24 November	First double infection case confirmed in the United States in the world.
24 November	First case confirmed in Montserrat.
27 November	First death confirmed in Algeria.
27 November	First double infection case confirmed in South Korea.
27 November	First mutation ( D222G ) confirmed in France.
27 November	First case of Oseltamivir (Tamiflu) resistance found in France.
28 November	First canine zoonosis confirmed in China in the world.
28 November	First human-to-animal transmission of the virus in Indonesia.
28 November	First mutation ( D222G ) confirmed in Brazil.
30 November	First mutation ( D222G ) confirmed in Finland.
30 November	First mutation ( D222G ) confirmed in Italy.
30 November	First human-to-animal transmission of the virus in Finland.
30 November	First double infection case confirmed in Brazil.
30 November	First death confirmed in Libya.
1 December	First death confirmed in Montenegro.
2 December	First human-to-animal transmission of the virus in the United Kingdom.
3 December	First mutation ( D222G ) confirmed in Netherlands.
3 December	First death confirmed in Albania.
3 December	First canine zoonosis confirmed in Brazil.
4 December	First mutation ( D222G ) confirmed in Spain.
7 December	First death confirmed in North Korea.
9 December	(Macau) First mutation ( D222G ) confirmed in Macao.
13 December	(Georgia (country)) First death confirmed in Georgia.
13 December	Mass vaccinations begin in Qatar.
14 December	First death confirmed in Armenia.
15 December	First human-to-animal transmission of the virus in France.
16 December	First case of Oseltamivir (Tamiflu) resistance found in Germany.
17 December	First human-to-animal transmission of the virus in Thailand.
20 December	First completed clinical trials by a company for 2009/H1N1 vaccine in Brazil.
21 December	First canine zoonosis confirmed in the United States.
27 December	First death confirmed in Nepal.
2010	A(H1N1) Outbreak and Pandemic Milestones
1 January	Mass vaccinations begin in Malta.
5 January	Mass vaccinations begin in Brazil.
11 January	First case confirmed in Mali.
15 January	Mass vaccinations begin in Peru.
19 January	First death confirmed in Nigeria.
20 January	First death confirmed in Bermuda.
29 January	First case confirmed in Chad.
3 February	First case confirmed in Mauritania.
9 February	First case confirmed in Senegal.
25 February	First case confirmed in Niger.
27 March	Mass vaccinations begin in Cuba.
2 April	Mass vaccinations begin in Cambodia.
12 April	First case confirmed in Guinea.
26 April	Mass vaccinations begin in the Philippines.
10 August	(World Health Organization) H1N1 Pandemic officially declared over.

== See also ==
- 2009 flu deaths by region
