= La Gloria, Veracruz =

La Gloria
- Town
- Location within Veracruz Location within Mexico
- Coordinates: 19.3981°N 97.2812°W
- Country: Mexico
- State: Veracruz
- Municipality: Perote
- Elevation: 2,460 m (8,070 ft)

Population (2005)
  - Total: 2,243
- Time zone: UTC-6 (Central)
  - Summer (DST): UTC-5 (CDT)
- Postal code: 91290
- Area code: 282

La Gloria is a town in the municipality of Perote in the Mexican state of Veracruz. As of the 2005 population survey, it had a population of 2,243 (1092 men and 1151 women).

The town is located in Perote Valley and is surrounded by mountains. Its altitude of 2,460 metres (8,070 ft) makes it one of the highest areas of the state of Veracruz. It is located to the southwest of Cofre de Perote, approximately 40 kilometres (25 mi) from the city of Perote. It is connected to Perote by a small highway; there, the small highway intersects Federal Highway 140, which goes to Xalapa.

Half of the town's population lives and works in Mexico City, located 200 kilometres (120 mi) to the west, during the week. The town is located 8.5 kilometres (5.3 mi) from the Granjas Carroll de Mexico farming operation, which raised nearly 1,000,000 pigs in 2008. Many residents have protested the pig farming operation.

La Gloria is suspected to be the place where the 2009 swine flu pandemic originated.
