= John Merino =

John Merino (1967 – September 6, 2009) was an Ecuadorian colonel and the head of security for President Rafael Correa.

After co-ordinating security for such events as the Union of South American Nations and the independent bicentennial celebrations, Merino was promoted to security chief of Presidential security a few days before the inauguration for Rafael Correa’s second term.

On August 10, 2009 Merino was admitted to Quito’s military hospital with flu conditions. Merino was admitted to the ICU ward when it was discovered he was suffering from the H1N1 virus. Merino died at the age of 42 on September 6 after spending 27 days in hospital.
